= Tomb of Aegisthus =

Mycenaean tholos tomb built c. 1450 BCE

- Τάφος του Αιγίσθου (Greek)
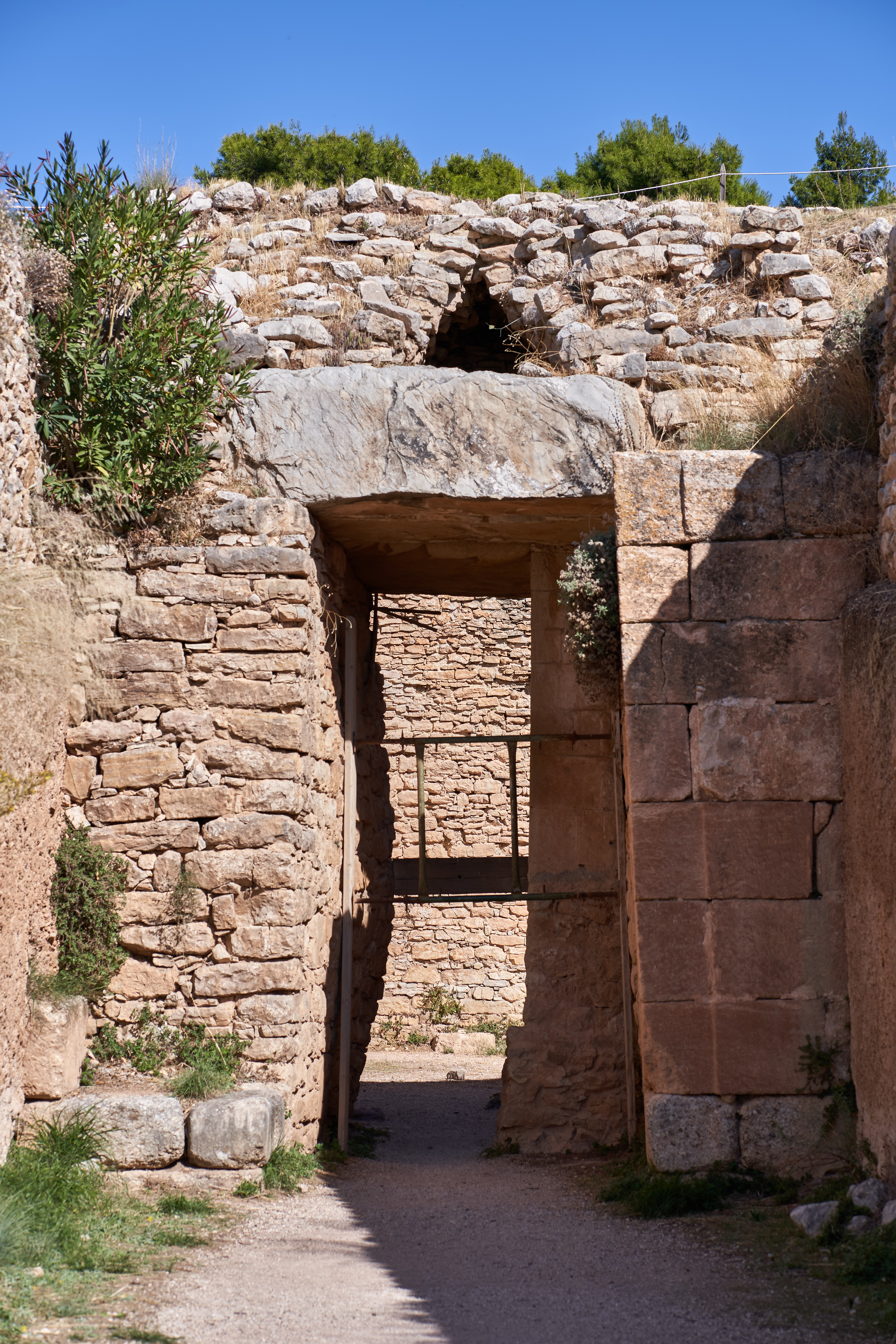
- The facade of the Tomb of Aegisthus, showing the small relieving triangle above the lintel

- Location in Peloponnese, Greece
- 37.7307°N 22.7556°E
- Type: Tomb
- Location: Mycenae, Peloponnese, Greece

History
- Built: Construction started; c. 1510 BC; Completed; c. 1450 BC

Site notes
- Material: Stone
- Height: c. 13 meters (original)
- Excavation dates: 1892, 1922
- Archaeologists: Alan Wace and Winifred Lamb
- Discovered: 1892 by Christos Tsountas
- Public access: Yes

UNESCO World Heritage Site
- Designated: 1999
- Part of: Archaeological Sites of Mycenae and Tiryns
- Reference no.: 941

The Tomb of Aegisthus is a Mycenaean tholos tomb located near the citadel of Mycenae, Greece. It was constructed in the Late Helladic IIA period, from around 1510–1450 BC, and discovered in the 19th century. It was first excavated by Winifred Lamb in 1922, as part of a project led by Alan Wace.

The Tomb of Aegisthus is the third-largest tholos tomb at Mycenae and the fourth-largest in the Aegean. Its architecture shows various transitional features between the architectural style of the oldest and later tholoi at Mycenae, such as the incorporation of ashlar masonry into the dromos and the use of a relieving triangle, though this latter feature was not recognised until the 1990s. Scholars have debated whether the tomb was constructed in a single phase, or whether some of these features represent later modifications to the tomb.

The tomb's traditional name comes from Greek mythology, in which Aegisthus was a king of Mycenae and the murderer of both Atreus and Agamemnon. No burials were found inside the tomb and the identity of the person or people who may have constructed it remains a mystery: the name likely dates to the late 19th or early 20th centuries, by association with the nearby tholoi conventionally known as the Treasury of Atreus and the Tomb of Clytemnestra.

At the time of its construction, the tomb was the largest of its kind in the Aegean region. The dating of the tomb was important in the 1920s in settling the so-called "Helladic Heresy", and clarifying the relationship between Mycenaean Greece and Minoan Crete.

== The tomb ==
=== Description ===
Late Bronze Age tombs and buildings at Mycenae. The Tomb of Aegisthus is numbered as tholos tomb 2

The tomb is located to the west of the citadel of Mycenae, around 70 meters from the Lion Gate, in an area used for burial since the Middle Helladic period (c. 2000–1600 BC). Its structure follows the typical tripartite division of Mycenaean tholos tombs into a narrow rectangular passageway (dromos), joined by a deep doorway (stomion) to a burial chamber (thalamos) surmounted by a corbelled dome. The dromos is around 22.45 meters long and 4.65 meters wide, while the thalamos is 13.96 meters in diameter and would originally have been around 13 meters tall. Like most tholoi at Mycenae, it is cut into the slope, facing downhill.

A 'relieving triangle' was built above the tomb's lintel, helping to direct the stress from the weight of the masonry towards the supported ends of the lintel-stone and therefore to reduce the torque applied to the stone. Such a feature would become universal in later tholos tombs at Mycenae, but the Tomb of Aegisthus is the earliest tholos to feature it. Other innovations include the lining of the dromos with rubble and the use of poros ashlar masonry for the façade, both of which foreshadow architectural conventions common in later tombs.

There are a total of nine tholos tombs at Mycenae. None were discovered intact, having been looted in antiquity, probably during the Iron Age. A likely burial pit was discovered in the floor of the thalamos, but no human remains were recovered to indicate who, if anyone, might have been buried in it.

=== Construction ===
James Wright has described the construction of tholos tombs, using the Tomb of Aegisthus as an example, as a 'monumental expression of power'. Digging out the thalamos alone required the excavation of 1,810m^{3} of earth, added to 585m^{3} for the dromos — a total project which Wright estimates would require a ten-person team to work for 240 days, on top of additional labour for the procurement, preparation and arrangement of the rubble and ashlar masonry used in the dromos and stomion. He considers that the total construction of the tomb would have taken over a year, and required a large workforce including skilled stoneworkers. At the time of its construction, it was the largest tholos tomb in the Aegean. (Note: Galanakis 2007, p. 240: it is the fourth largest overall, the three larger being Atreus, Clytemnestra, and the Treasury of Minyas at Orchomenos in Boeotia. All three date to the end of LH IIIA or early LH IIIB.)

During the excavation, Wace incorrectly concluded that the Tomb of Aegisthus had no relieving triangle, a judgement which remained the scholarly consensus until 1997, (Note: The triangle had, however, been noticed before: it was first recorded in an unpublished drawing made by Arthur Evans in 1924, based on observations by Duncan Mackenzie, and later its existence was suggested by Jean Servais in 1971.) when the area above the lintel was cleared during conservation work. The work revealed that the interior of the triangle, photographed by Wace in 1922, had been filled with a blocking wall some time after its initial construction, though the intrusion of much-later ceramic material into the space, partly as the result of an earthquake, made it impossible to ascertain the precise date.

The façade of the stomion is faced with large blocks of poros stone ashlar, behind which the structure is built from rubble masonry like that which lines the dromos. Wace believed that the ashlar façade was a later addition to the tomb, and that the monument had been constructed in two phases — firstly, the tomb was built in its entirety using rubble masonry, and later, 'with the object of making its entrance more imposing', a new ashlar façade was added. In support of this conclusion, he noted that the rubble masonry is bonded by mortar to that of the stomion, but that the ashlar masonry of the stomion is not bonded to the rubble masonry behind it; in addition, the ashlar façade seems to play little role in supporting the structural weight of the thalamos's corbelled dome. However, Wace's two-phase model has been questioned since the late 20th century: Clare Loader argued in 1998 that the ashlar façade may have played a structural role in buttressing the rubble one behind it, and so been added either during or immediately after the initial construction of the tomb, while Yannis Galanakis has argued that the tomb's unusual features may represent a single coherent plan, the result of 'architectural experimentation', perhaps influenced by the contemporaneous building of the tholos tomb at Berbati, and that the evidence is insufficient to tell whether the tomb was built in a single phase or in two.

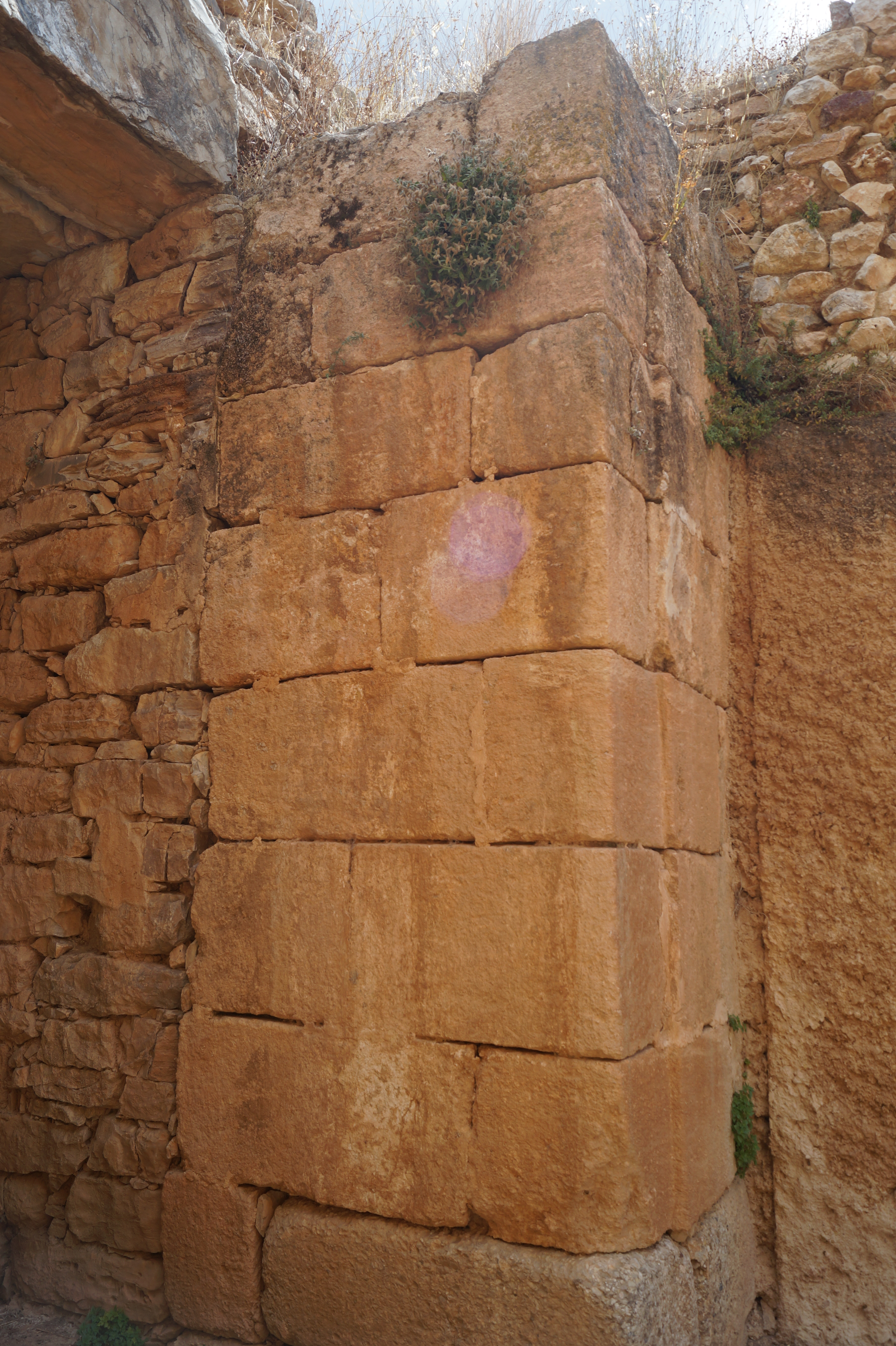
Part of the stomion, showing ashlar-masonry façade in front of rubble

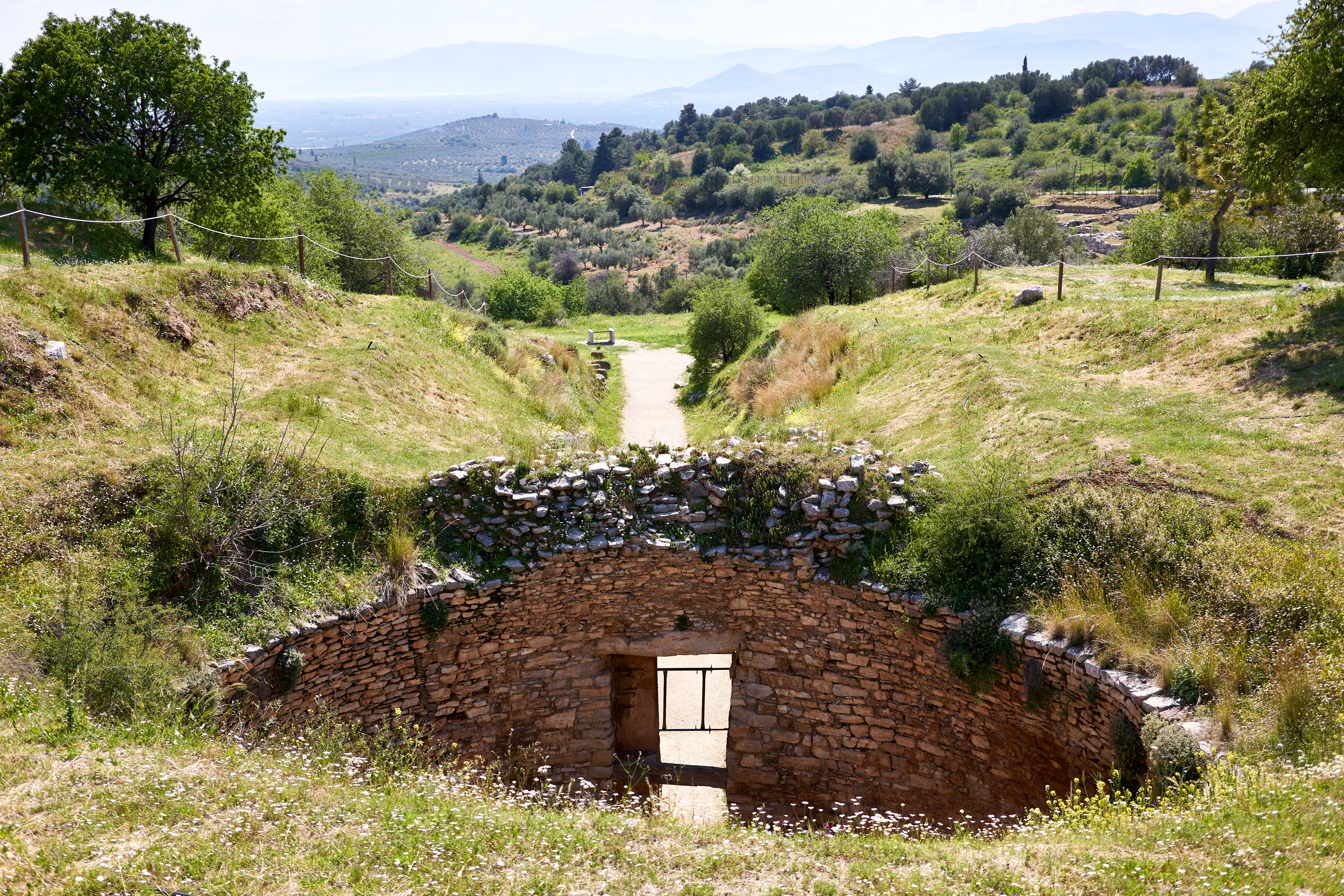
View looking over the tomb, down the dromos. The small relieving triangle is just visible over the inner lintel.

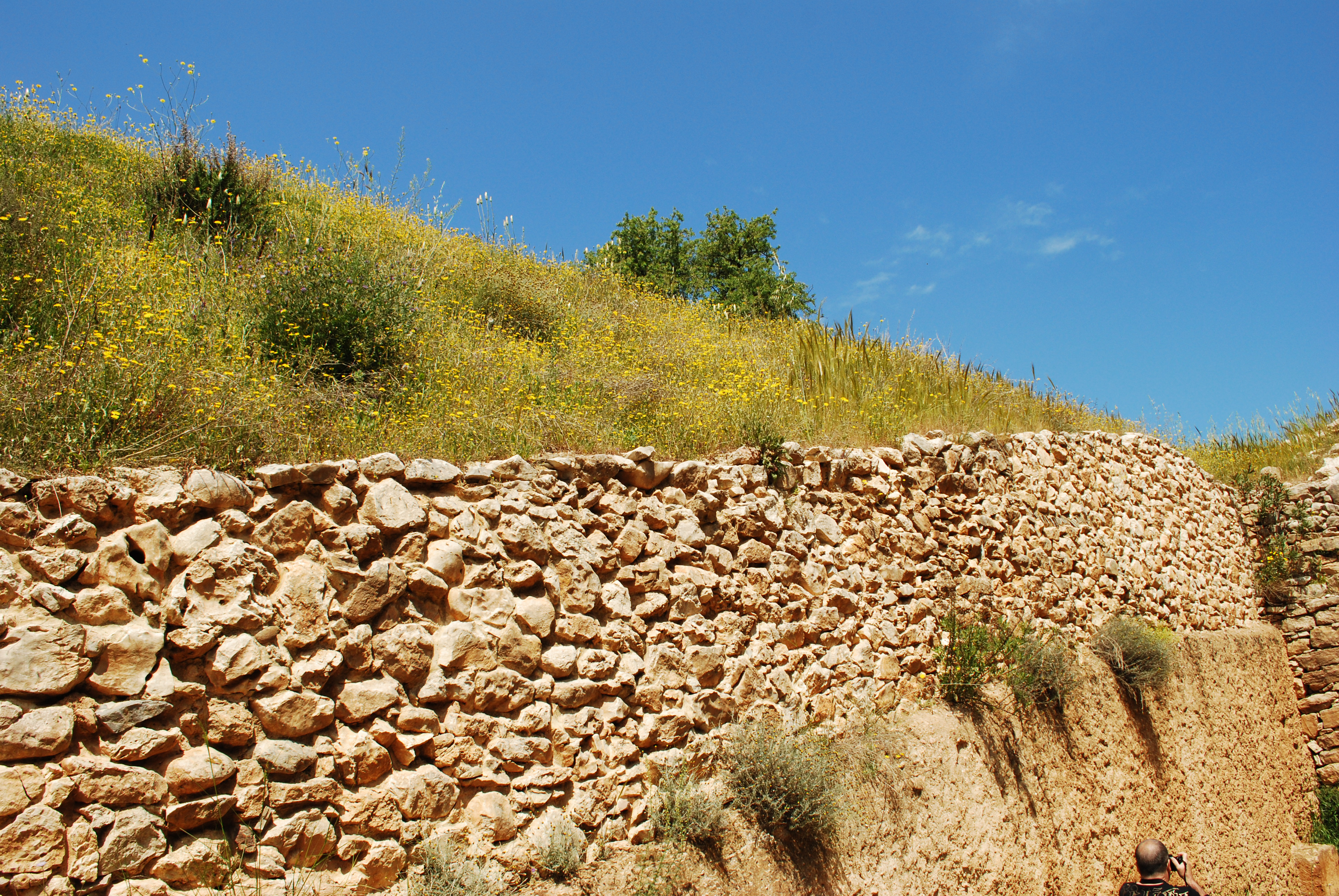
View of the inner wall of the dromos, showing the use of rubble masonry to line it

=== Name ===
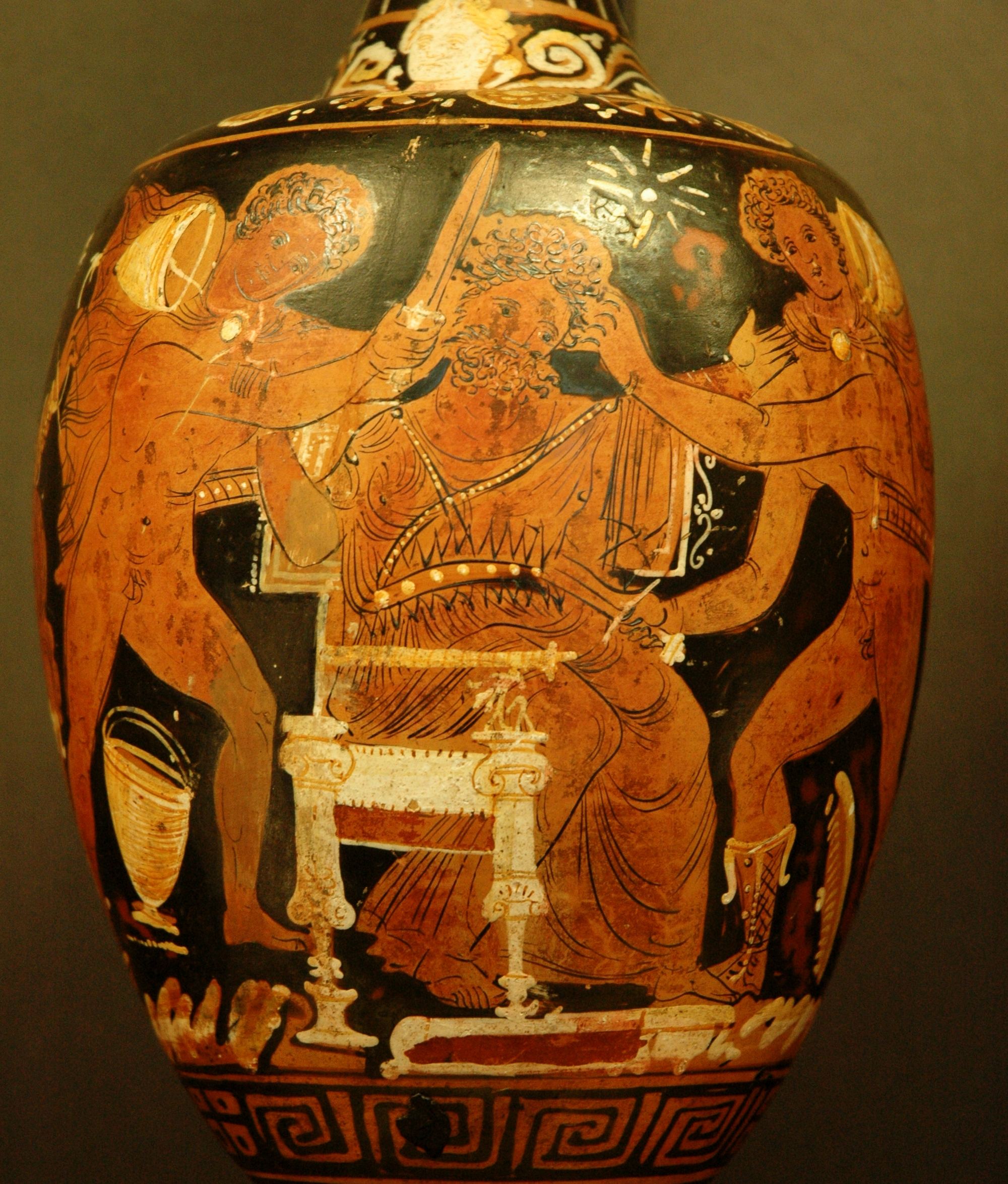
The murder of Aegisthus by Orestes and Pylades. Red-figure Apulian oinochoe (wine jug), c. 430–300 BC

The tomb is named for Aegisthus, the mythological lover of Clytemnestra, wife of king Agamemnon of Mycenae. In Greek mythology, Aegisthus first murdered Atreus, Agamemnon's father, in order to restore his own father Thyestes to the throne; then, after Agamemnon drove him from power and departed for the Trojan War, Aegisthus became the lover of Clytemnestra and, on Agamemnon's return from Troy, assisted her in murdering the king. He then ruled Mycenae for seven years until he was killed in turn by Orestes, Agamemnon's son, alongside Clytemnestra.

The nearby Treasury of Atreus or 'Tomb of Agamemnon' was traditionally known by that name long before the renewal of archaeological interest in it in the 19th century. (Note: Pausanias mentions 'underground chambers of Atreus and his children, in which were stored their treasures ... and the grave of Agamemnon.'. The tholos had remained visible since Antiquity, and was named the 'Tomb of Atreus' by Claude-Louis Fourmont, who visited Mycenae in 1729–1730. Edward Daniel Clarke, who travelled to Mycenae at the beginning of the 19th century, was aware that it was traditionally known as the 'Treasury of Atreus' and identified with the tomb of Agamemnon mentioned in Pausanias, but disputed the identification based on discrepancies between Pausanias' account and the observable ruins.) The Tomb of Aegisthus is so named because it is positioned adjacent to another tholos, known as the 'Tomb of Clytemnestra'. (Note: Like that of the Treasury of Atreus, the origin of the name 'Tomb of Clytemnestra' is obscure. It was certainly visible above ground early in the 19th century; in 1876, Heinrich and Sophia Schliemann conducted excavations in the tomb, which Heinrich named only as 'The Treasury near the Lions' Gate' in his publication of the excavations. However, by the time of Christos Tsountas' excavations of 1892, he referred to it as the 'Tomb of Clytemnestra', and implied that the name had already gained general currency; in 1893, Thomas Kay, a travelling member of the Manchester Literary and Philosophical Society, wrote of visiting 'that which is called the Tomb of Clytemnestra'. It can therefore be said for certain that the name 'Tomb of Clytemnestra' had become securely attached to the tholos by the turn of the 20th century, either before or after Schliemann's excavations.) The precise origin of its name is uncertain: Christos Tsountas, who first published the rediscovery of the tomb in 1892, did not name it, only referring to it as "another [tomb] not far from the Lions' Gate", nor did he assign it a name in his 1897 publication of The Mycenaean Age. Alan Wace mentioned that the tomb is "now christened the Tomb of Aegisthus" in his 1923 write-up of his excavations, and had previously referred to it by that name in the excavation daybook of 1922.

=== Post-Mycenaean history ===
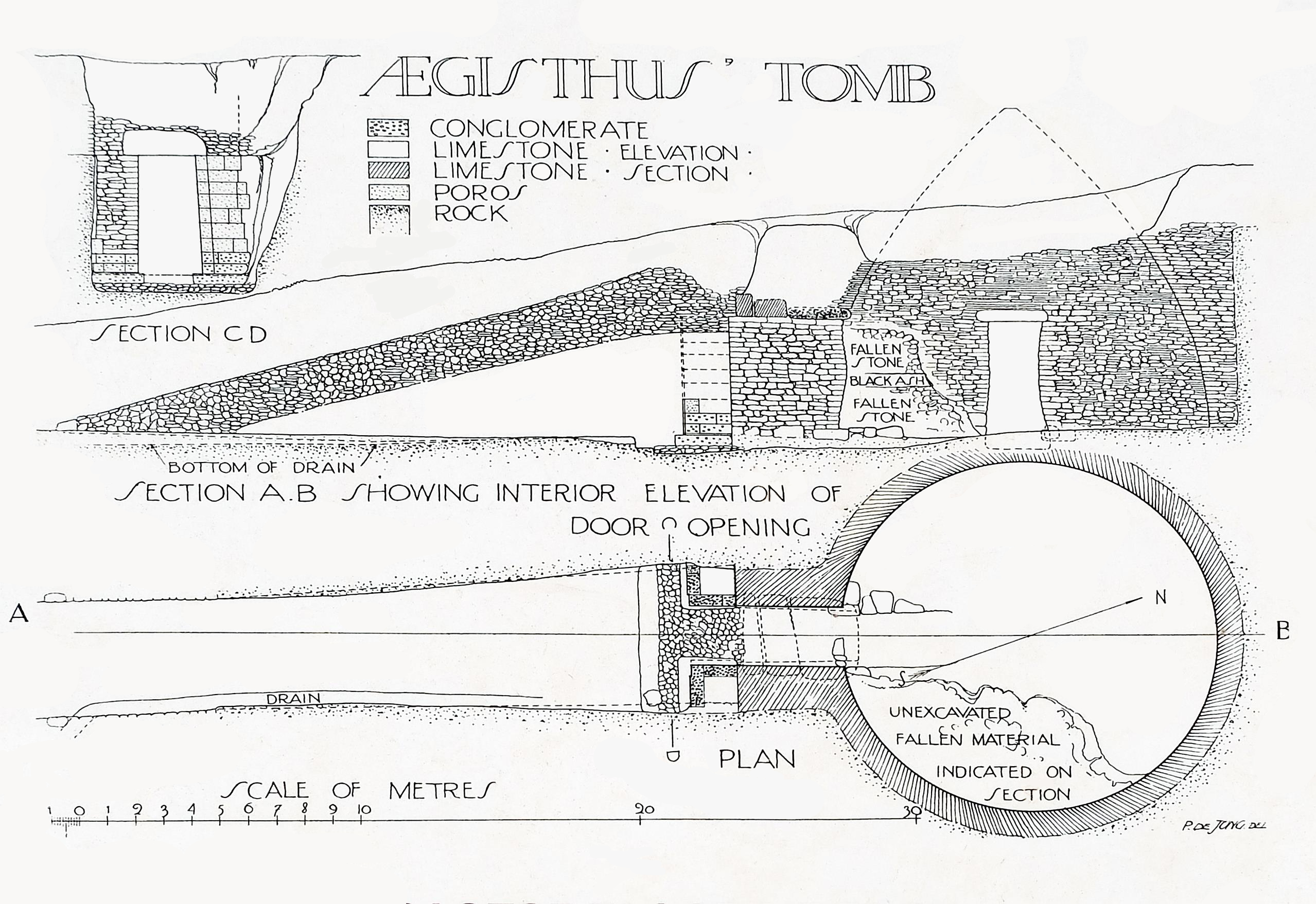
Plan and section of the tomb, drawn up by Piet Jong between 1920–1923

The dome collapsed some time after the tomb's construction: from an original height of c. 13m, only about 8m of height remains.

Wace noted finds of Geometric, Classical and Hellenistic pottery, particularly in the dromos, which he interpreted as the remains of post-Mycenaean tomb-robbers. However, it has since been suggested that they may represent the use of the tomb for 'hero cult' from the Iron Age onward, a practice observed at many of the Mycenaean chamber tombs at Mycenae and other sites in the Argolid, such as Prosymna. The tomb may have played an ideological role for the short-lived Argive colony at Mycenae, established in the 3rd century BCE but abandoned within a century, which restored the so-called "Agamemnonion" (shrine of Agamemnon) between Mycenae and Prosymna and may have used the Mycenaean tombs now known as "Aegisthus", "Epano Phournos" and "Clytemnestra" as a focus for the commemoration of Mycenae's heroes, in doing so asserting its status and prestige vis-à-vis Argos.

The 1922 excavations also found a layer of ash inside the thalamos, with the remains of several olive kernels, on top of the traces of the collapsed dome. Wace hypothesised that this reflected the use of the tomb, after the end of the Mycenaean period, as a shelter for 'shepherds, outlaws or others having work in the neighbourhood', and that the kernels represented the remains of food, particularly bread and olives, that they ate around campfires while sheltering from the wind.

== Excavation ==
The tomb was first formally described by Christos Tsountas in 1892, though it may have been noticed by Friedrich Welcker during his travels through Greece in 1843. Tsountas' excavations of 1892 found the tomb in the course of clearing the adjacent Tomb of Clytemnestra, but did not excavate as the tomb was only discovered towards the end of the digging season, and Tsountas considered that he did not have sufficient time. He returned and partially explored the tomb in 1893.

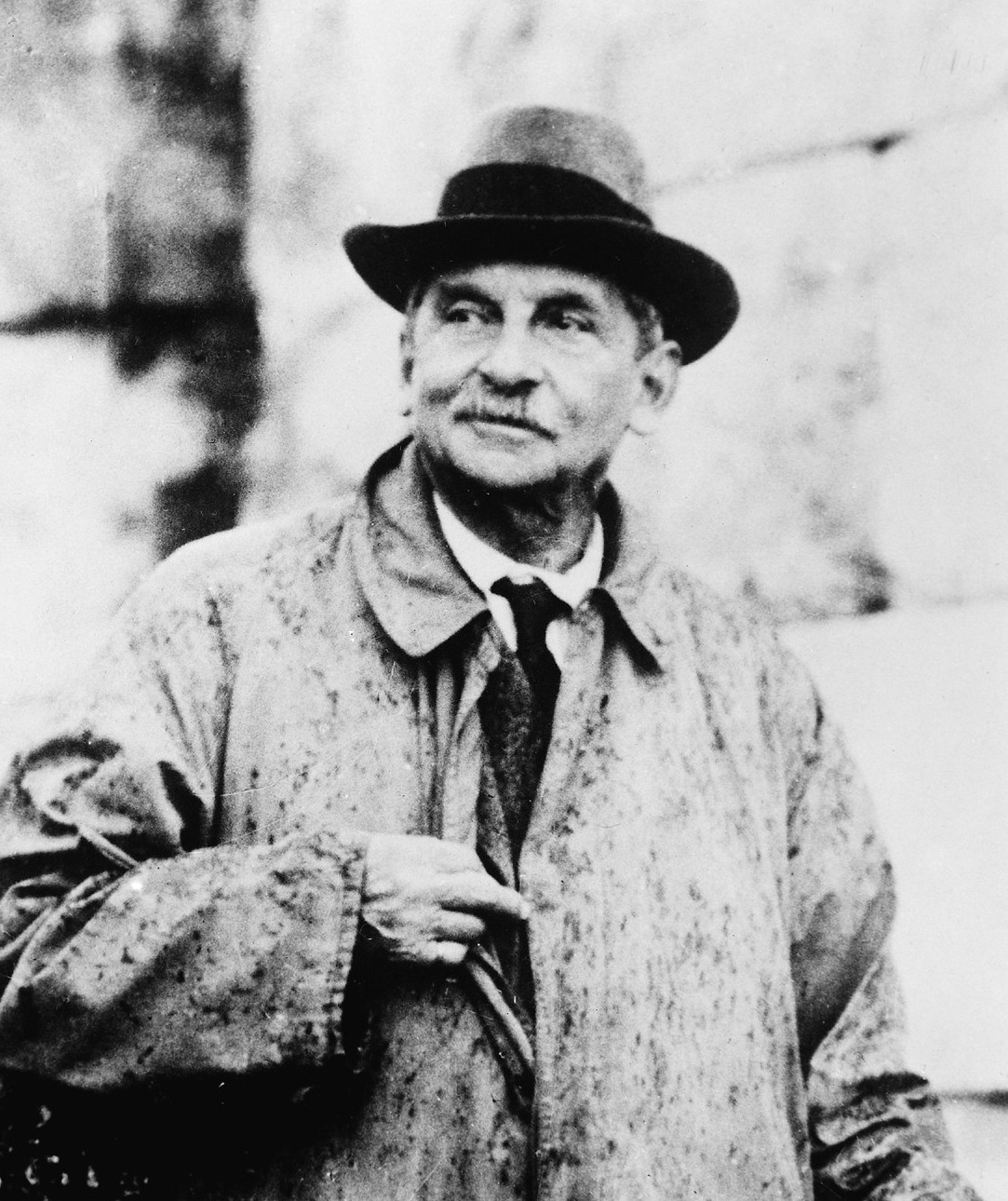
Arthur Evans, probably around the 1920s. Evans contributed financially to the excavation of the tomb, hoping that it would provide evidence for the domination of Minoan Crete over Mycenae.

=== Wace's excavations (1922) ===
The British School at Athens began excavations at Mycenae in 1920, encouraged by Arthur Evans, whose excavations of Knossos on Crete between 1900 and 1905 had introduced the concept of 'Minoan Civilisation'. Evans's work on Crete raised questions as to the origins and development of the 'Mycenaean' civilisation, labelled as such after Heinrich Schliemann's 1876 excavations of the Shaft Graves at Mycenae. In Evans's mind, his discoveries at Knossos proved that Crete was the centre of the dominant power of the Bronze-Age Aegean, in line with the Classical myths of a Cretan 'thalassocracy' under King Minos. (Note: See e.g. Thucydides 1.4: John Pendlebury would later explicitly connect the myth of Minos with Knossos under the label of 'the Minoan thalassocracy'.) With some assistance from Evans, the British School at Athens persuaded both the Greek government and Christos Tsountas, who held the permit, to allow them to excavate with Alan Wace as field director.

Evans had been particularly keen for the excavation of the Tomb of Aegisthus, and donated £100 (equivalent to £3,900 in 2025) towards that project, believing that the exercise would provide confirmatory evidence that 'Minoans' had risen to dominance at Mycenae between the Shaft Grave period (c.1600–1450 BC) and the construction of the tholoi. Wace, meanwhile, had previously co-authored a 1918 article with Carl Blegen, arguing instead for an essential continuity between 'Helladic' culture through the Shaft Graves until the end of the Bronze Age, and that the character of Middle Helladic and later mainland culture was "Mycenaean as opposed to Cretan". Where Evans believed that the Shaft Graves and tholoi were broadly contemporary, both representing the burials of Minoan rulers of Mycenae, Wace and Blegen correctly believed that the tholoi were considerably later. Excavations of the then-unexplored tholoi (all except the Treasury of Atreus and the Tomb of Clytemnestra) were intended to settle the question of their chronology, and so, in Wace's mind, to disprove the chronological assumptions on which Evans's argument rested. John Droop later called Wace and Blegen's ideas the "Helladic Heresy".

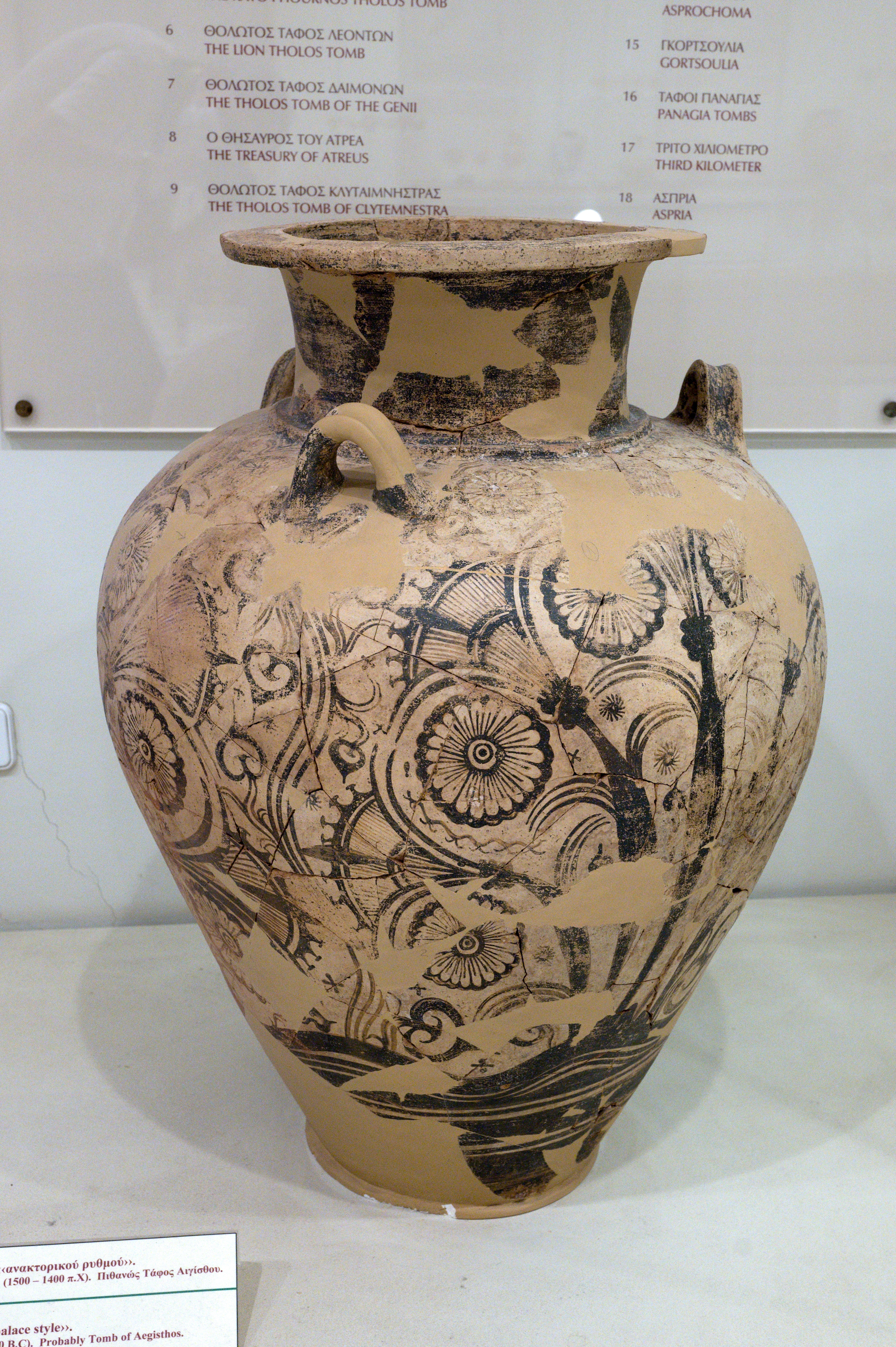
A Palace-style piriform jar excavated from the tomb in 1922

The tomb was excavated between 15 June and 8 July 1922 by Winifred Lamb, who was serving as second-in-charge of the Mycenae excavations under Wace. While the tomb was not intact, and appeared to have been largely emptied since the Mycenaean period, the excavation found the partial remains of a boar's tusk helmet at a level approximately 1 m (3.3 ft) above the dromos floor, as well as gold, ivory, obsidian, and carnelian objects on the original floor level of the dromos, which Wace took to belong to the original contents of the tomb. Among the finds were small fragments of an ivory carving, which Wace reconstructed as being similar in design to the relief of the Lion Gate, around 20 cm wide. Several Palace-style piriform (pear-shaped) jars, made on Crete during the LM II period (c. 1440–1400 BC), were found in fragments trodden into the floor of both the dromos and the thalamos, providing strong evidence that they were part of the earliest burial assemblages in the tomb, and therefore helping both to date the monument and to provide evidence of connections between Mycenae and Minoan Crete in this period.

Wace and Lamb had planned to excavate the tomb in its entirety between 1922 and 1923, but were unable to return in 1923 due to safety concerns about the partially collapsed dome roof. They therefore left the tomb with the dromos and stomion entirely excavated, but about a third of the thalamos uncleared. While the project had intended to fully excavate all seven of the thus-far unexcavated tholoi at Mycenae between 1920 and 1923, the Tomb of Aegisthus would be the only one excavated in this period: the others were, however, re-examined and their first architectural plans drawn up by Piet Jong. Wace's team also undertook conservation work on the monument, including the digging of a drain around the tomb to prevent rain damage.

==== Importance to the 'Helladic Heresy' ====
By May 1923, Wace and Lamb had constructed the outline of a three-phase chronological model for the tholoi at Mycenae, in which they argued for a progressive increase in the scale and monumentality of the tombs. The features of the Tomb of Aegisthus (see table below), while mostly belonging to the 'first group' dated to early LH IIA (c. 1510–1480 BC), included attributes common to early tombs in the 'second group', dated later in LH IIA (c. 1480–1450 BC). The large quantity of diagnostic pottery found in the Aegisthus tomb, including broken LH II vessels found partly in the dromos and partly in the thalamos, allowed Wace to confidently date the tomb to early LH IIA, and so to argue that it represented the transition between the 'first group' and the 'second group' — in particular, that the supposed second phase of construction had been intended to bring the tomb into line with the innovations employed by the 'second group'. (Note: Wace conjectured that the two phases represented two generations: that the original tomb had been built for the burial of a king, and that his son and successor had elected to elaborate his father's tomb rather than building his own.)

The three chronological groups of tholoi at Mycenae proposed by Alan Wace. 'Second-group' features of the Tomb of Aegisthus marked with (*). (Note: Data adapted from Galanakis 2007, p. 244, modified in reference to Mason 2013. Chronological dates from Shelmerdine 2008, p. 4)
	First Group	Second Group	Third Group
Date	LH IIA Early (c. 1510-1480 BC)	LH IIA Late (c. 1480-1450 BC)	LH IIB-LH IIIB (c. 1450-1300 BC)
Tombs	Cyclopaean Epano Phournos Aegisthus	Panagia Kato Phournos Lion	Genii Atreus Clytemnestra
Features			
Dromos	Cut directly from rock, without lining	Lined with rubble(*), later lined with poros ashlar.	Lined with conglomerate ashlar
Façade	Constructed from rubble	Constructed from poros (*) or conglomerate ashlar.	Constructed from conglomerate ashlar
Doorways and jambs	Built from large blocks, often structurally fragile	Built solidly from large, dressed conglomerate blocks.	Built solidly from large, dressed conglomerate blocks
Relieving triangle	Absent	Present (*).	Present
Thalamos masonry	Rubble	Rubble, later with a conglomerate base	Conglomerate ashlar

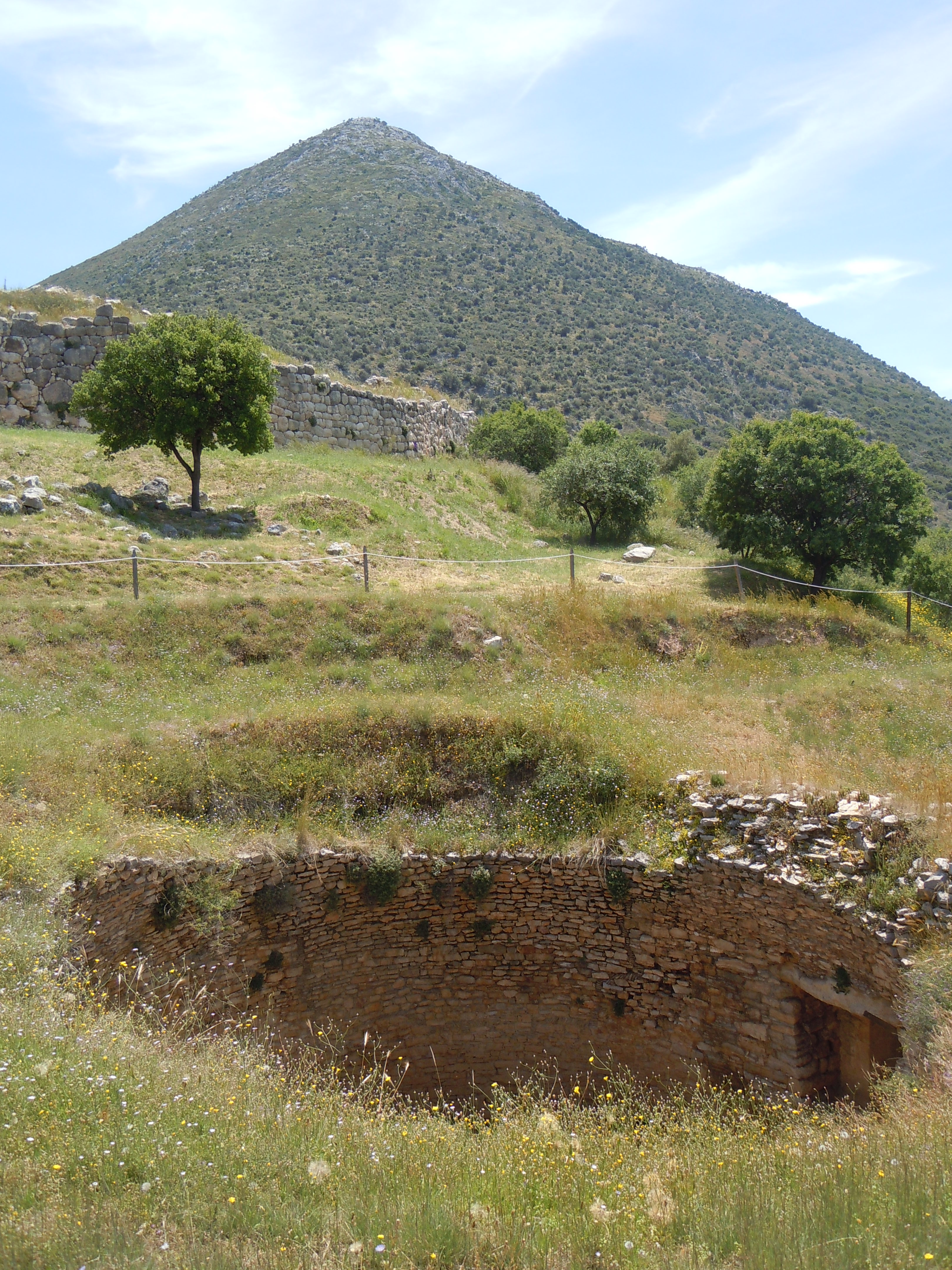
Looking east over the Tomb of Aegisthus, with the citadel walls of Mycenae and Mount Zara in the background

The Tomb of Aegisthus' transitional status, between the 'first group' and 'second group' of tholoi, as well the fact that its date could be securely ascertained from ceramic remains, provided strong evidence for the validity of Wace's chronology. This was important to the 'Helladic Heresy' for two reasons. Firstly, it demonstrated that the grandest examples of tholoi at Mycenae, particularly the Treasury of Atreus (c. 1350 BC) and the Tomb of Clytemnestra (c. 1300 BC), were indeed considerably later in date than both the Shaft Graves (c. 1600–1450 BC) and the apogee of Neopalatial Minoan civilisation on Crete, which ended around 1500 BC. Secondly, the apparent 'crescendo' of monumentality and elaboration in Mycenae's tholoi did not fit with Evans's view that Mycenae had become subjected and subordinated to Crete during the period of their construction, which Evans argued would have produced a 'diminuendo' in the site's wealth and ostentation.

=== Later excavations ===
As part of Wace's Mycenae excavations of 1939–1954, William Taylour excavated the area around the outside of the Tomb of Aegisthus, finding a thick layer of clay which had been used in the construction of the tholos to augment and waterproof the corbelled dome.

Further excavations were carried out by the Archaeological Society of Athens in 1955, under the direction of Ioannis Papadimitriou. These excavations cleared the part of the thalamos left unexcavated by the British excavations of 1922, revealing more pottery from the Neopalatial and Hellenistic periods and providing confirmatory evidence for Wace's dating of the tomb.

=== Conservation ===
In 1915, the Greek Archaeological Service reinforced the lintel stone of the inner rubble façade, which had cracked, with concrete.

In addition to the digging of a drain in 1923, conservation work was carried out by Alan Wace's team during the 1920–1923 seasons. This included the use of cement and fresh stone to reinforce the tomb's inner doorway, and the replacement of missing pieces of masonry around the tomb with new ones, which were sometimes cemented into place.

By the 1990s, the tholos had been severely damaged by erosion from the ingress of rain water, particularly in the stomion. Further conservation work was carried out by the Greek Archaeological Service in 1997–1998 to reinforce the internal structure of the tomb, which also revealed the existence of the small relieving triangle above the lintel.

== Bibliography ==
- Alcock, Susan (1997). "The Heroic Past in a Hellenistic Present". In Cartledge, Paul; Garnsey, Peter; Gruen, Erich (eds.). Hellenistic Constructs: Essays in Culture, History, and Historiography. Berkeley and Los Angeles: University of California Press. pp. 20–34.
- Antonaccio, Carla (1995). "Contesting the Past: Hero Cult, Tomb Cult, and Epic in Early Greece". American Journal of Archaeology. 98 (3): 389–410. doi:10.2307/506436. JSTOR 506436. S2CID 192969382.
- Blegen, Carl; Wace, Alan (1918). "The Pre-Mycenaean Pottery of the Mainland". The Annual of the British School at Athens. 22: 175–189. doi:10.1017/S0068245400009916. S2CID 163842512.
- Clarke, Edward Daniel (1814). Travels in Various Countries of Europa, Asia and Africa: Part the Second: Greece, Egypt and the Holy Land: Section the Second. London: T.Cadell and W. Davies. Archived from the original on 2023-01-03.
- Droop, John Percival (1926). "Mycenae 1921–1923: Legitimate and Illegitimate Criticism". Annals of Archaeology and Anthropology. 13: 43–48.
- Evans, Arthur (1929). The Shaft Graves and Bee-Hive Tombs of Mycenae and their Inter-Relations. London.
- Galanakis, Yannis (2007). "The Construction of the Aegisthus Tholos Tomb at Mycenae and the 'Helladic Heresy'". The Annual of the British School at Athens. 102: 239–256. doi:10.1017/S0068245400021481. JSTOR 30245251. S2CID 162590402.
- Hope Simpson, Richard (2003). "The Dodecanese and the Ahhiyawa Question". Annual of the British School at Athens. 98: 203–237. JSTOR 30073207.
- Iakovidis, Spyros; French, Elizabeth; Shelton, Kim; Ioannides, Charalambos; Jansen, Anton; Lavery, John (2003). Archaeological Atlas of Mycenae. Library of the Archaeological Society of Athens. Vol. 229. Athens: Archaeological Society of Athens. ISBN 960-8145-40-6.
- Jameson, Michael H. (1990). "Perseus, the Hero of Mykenai". In Hägg, Robin; Nordquist, Gullög Christine (eds.). Celebrations of Death and Divinity in the Bronze Age Argolid. Stockholm. pp. 213–222.
- Kay, Thomas (1893). "A Visit to Greece". Papers of the Manchester Literary Society: 111–134. Archived from the original on 2022-12-14.
- Lamb, Winifred; Wace, Alan (1921). "Excavations at Mycenae". Annual of the British School at Athens. 24: 185–209. JSTOR 30102522.
- Loader, Clare (1998). Building in Cyclopean Masonry. Jonsered.
- MacGillivray, Joseph (2000). Minotaur: Sir Arthur Evans and the Archaeology of the Minoan Myth. London.
- Maravelia, Amanda-Alice (2002). "The Orientations of the Nine Tholos Tombs at Mycenae". Journal for the History of Astronomy. 33 (27): 63–66. doi:10.1177/002182860203302705. S2CID 121978172.
- March, Jenny (2009). The Penguin Book of Classical Myths. London: Penguin. ISBN 9780141020778.
- Mason, David J. (2013). "The Date of the Tomb of Clytemnestra". The Annual of the British School at Athens. 108 (1): 97–119. JSTOR 43188527. S2CID 191384405.
- Moore, Dudley; Rowlands, Edward; Karadimas, Nektarios (2014). In Search of Agamemnon: Early Travellers to Mycenae. Newcastle upon Tyne: Cambridge Scholars Publishing. ISBN 978-1-4438-5776-5.
- Orlandos, Anastasios (1955). Γενικὴ ἔκθεσις τοῦ Γραμματέως [Secretary's General Report] (PDF). Πρακτικά της εν Αθήναις Αρχαιολογικής Εταιρείας (in Greek): 1–35. Archived from the original (PDF) on 2022-09-22.
- Palyvou, Clairy; Kapokakis, Emmanouel (1997). "Deformations of the Mycenaean tholos tomb of Aigisthos, Greece". In Marinos, Paul G.; Koukis, G.C.; Tsiambaos, G.C.; Stournaras, G.C. (eds.). Engineering Geology and the Environment: Volume 3. Rotterdam: A.A. Balkema. pp. 3223–3227. ISBN 9054108800.
- Pendlebury, John (1939). The Archaeology of Crete: An Introduction. London: Methuen. ISBN 978-0-416-72590-2.
- Schliemann, Heinrich (1880) [1877]. Mycenae: A Narrative of Researches and Discoveries at Mycenae and Tiryns. New York: Charles Scribner's Sons.
- Shelmerdine, Cynthia (2008). "Introduction: Background, Methods and Sources". In Shelmerdine, Cynthia (ed.). The Cambridge Companion to the Aegean Bronze Age. Cambridge: Cambridge University Press. pp. 1–18.
- Taylour, William (1955). "Part IV. The Perseia Area". The Annual of the British School at Athens. 50: 199–237. doi:10.1017/S0068245400018633. S2CID 130373257.
- Tsountas, Christos (1897). The Mycenaean Age: A Study of the Monuments and Culture of Pre-Homeric Greece. London.
- Tsountas, Christos (1892). "Ἑνδεκάτη ἀνασκαφὴ ἐν Μυκἠναις" (PDF). Πρακτικά της εν Αθήναις Αρχαιολογικής Εταιρείας: 56–58.
- Wace, Alan; Holland, Leicester (1923). "Excavations at Mycenae § IX — The Tholos Tombs". The Annual of the British School at Athens. 25: 283–402. doi:10.1017/S0068245400010352. S2CID 183795426.
- Wace, Alan; Lamb, Winifred (1922). "Excavations at Mycenae Daybook 1922". University of Cambridge Digital Library.
- Wace, Alan (1923). "Excavations at Mycenae § VI — The Campaign of 1923". The Annual of the British School at Athens. 25: 5–8. doi:10.1017/S0068245400010352. S2CID 183795426.
- Wright, James (1987). "Death and Power at Mycenae: Changing Symbols in Mortuary Practice". In Laffineur, Robert (ed.). Les coutumes funéraires en Égée à l'âge du Bronze. Actes du colloque de Liège, 21-23 avril 1986 (Aegaeum 1). Liège. pp. 171–184.
