= Kato Phournos tholos =

Bronze Age tholos tomb at Mycenae, Greece

- Κάτω Φούρνος (Greek)
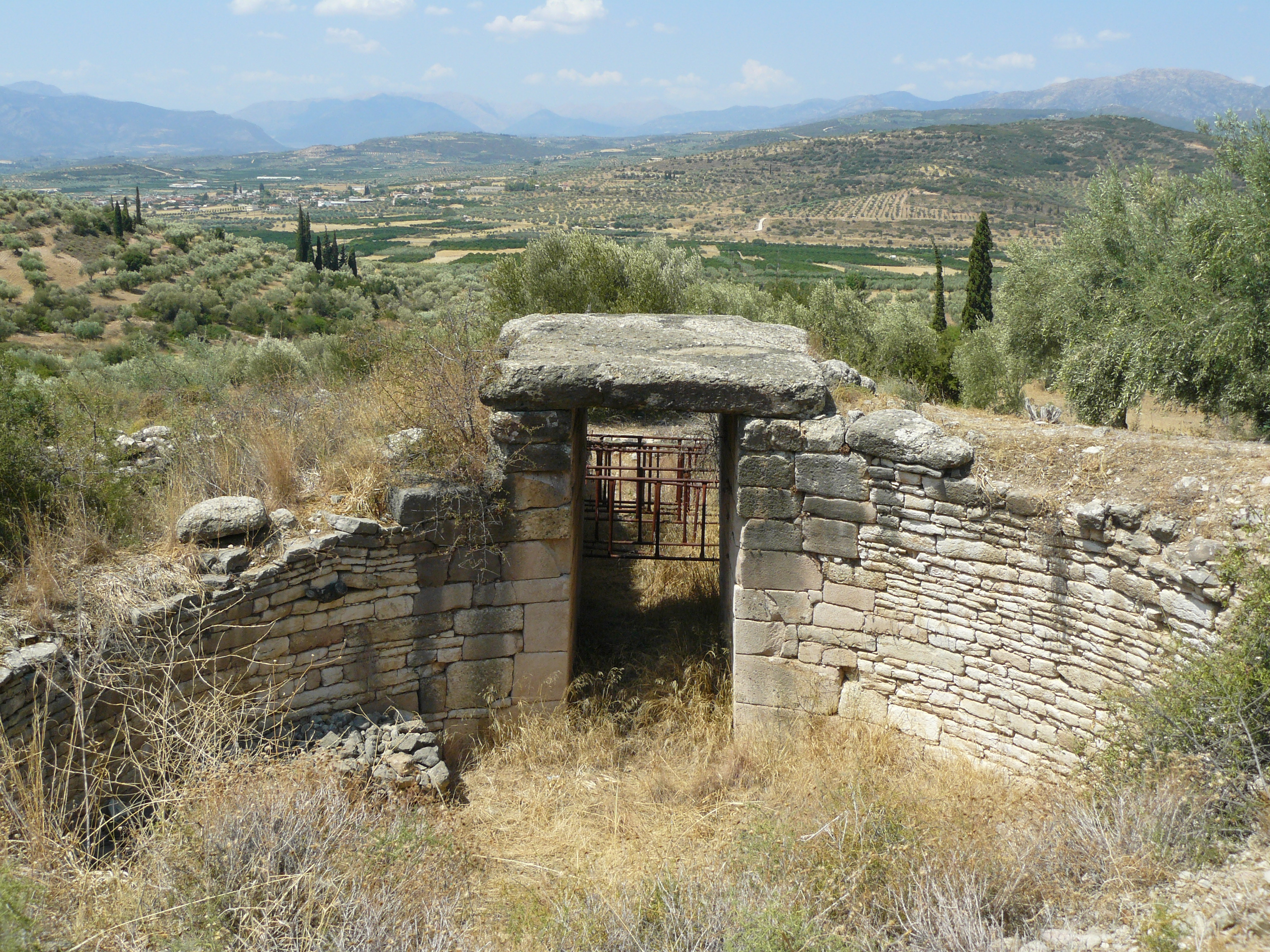
- The tomb's stomion (entrance), viewed from over the chamber, in 2013

- Location of the Kato Phournos tholos in the Peloponnese
- 37°43′53″N 22°44′58″E
- Type: Mycenaean tholos tomb
- Periods: Late Helladic IIA
- Location: Mycenae, Argolis, Greece

Site notes
- Material: Poros stone
- Excavation dates: 1893; 1922
- Archaeologists: Christos Tsountas; Alan Wace
- Public access: Yes

UNESCO World Heritage Site
- Designated: 1999
- Part of: Archaeological Sites of Mycenae and Tiryns
- Reference no.: 941

The Kato Phournos tholos (Note: Greek: Κάτω Φούρνος, romanised: Kato Fournos, lit. 'Lower Lime-Kiln'. The tomb was initially named the "Oleander Tomb" by its British excavators. The name "Kato Phournos", as with that of the nearby Epano Phournos (lit. 'Upper Lime-Kiln'), originated from the mistaken identification of the tomb's ruins for a lime-kiln.) is a Mycenaean tholos tomb at the Bronze Age site of Mycenae in southern Greece. It is one of the earliest tholos tombs (tholoi) at the site, dating to the Late Helladic IIA period (c. 1635/1600 – c. 1480/1470 BCE). Like other examples of the type, it consisted of a round burial chamber surmounted by a corbelled roof, itself entered by a narrow rectangular passage known as the dromos. It is situated on the west side of the Panagia Ridge, approximately 600 m (660 yd) west of the settlement.

The tomb was lined with ashlar masonry and contains a large burial pit in its chamber. It was looted in antiquity, and noted by early travellers to Mycenae. It was first recorded by the antiquary William Gell following a visit to Mycenae in 1805, though Gell mistook it for the remains of a gate. It was excavated by Christos Tsountas in 1893 and by Alan Wace, who also re-examined Tsountas's spoil heaps, in 1922. Finds from the tomb included the remains of several Palace Style storage jars (amphorae), made on Minoan Crete and approximately contemporary with the tomb's construction, as well as several fragments of Mycenaean pottery which postdated it, and a large number of female terracotta figurines from the archaic period (c. 700 – 479 BCE).

== Description ==
The Kato Phournos tholos is a Mycenaean tholos tomb. Tholos tombs, or tholoi, are a form of monumental burial that originated in Messenia, in southwest Greece, at the end of the Middle Helladic III period (that is, c. 1700 – c. 1675 BCE). They may have developed as a more monumental version of the burial mounds, or tumuli, used in mainland Greece throughout the Middle Helladic period; they may also have been influenced by similar styles of built tombs used in Minoan Crete.

Tholoi consist of a narrow rectangular entrance passage, known as the dromos, which leads into an underground burial chamber, separated from the dromos by an entrance-way called the stomion, which would usually be sealed with a dry-stone wall. The walls of the chamber, and sometimes the dromos, were lined with dry-stone masonry. The chamber was capped with a rounded roof constructed by the technique of corbelling, by which courses of blocks were overlapped in increasingly small circles. They were typically used for multiple burials, perhaps of members of the same family, and many were periodically re-opened for additional interments and for ritual activity.

During the Late Bronze Age, a total of nine tholoi were constructed at Mycenae. The Kato Phournos tomb dates to the Late Helladic IIA period (c. 1635/1600 – c. 1480/1470 BCE), the first period in which the tombs were constructed at the site. (Note: Mee 2010, p. 286; Boyd 2015, p. 438. For the absolute dates, see Manning 2010, p. 28.) It is located approximately 600 m (660 yd) west of the settlement, on the western slope of the Panagia Ridge.

The tomb's dromos is 12 metres (39 ft) long and 3 metres (10 ft) wide, and was lined with blocks of poros stone cut and dressed with hammers and chisels into ashlar masonry. The stomion is 4 metres (13 ft) high, 2 metres (6.6 ft) wide, and 4 metres (13 ft) deep, and constructed largely of blocks of coglomerate. The chamber is 10 metres (33 ft) in diameter; Alan Wace, who investigated the tomb in 1922, estimated its original height as about 9 metres (30 ft). The chamber contains a large burial-pit, approximately 5 by 2 metres (16.4 by 6.6 ft) in area and 1 metre (3.3 ft) deep, which follows the southwest part of the wall. The floor of the tomb is cut from the rock, and covered in the stomion and chamber with a layer of cement.

== Archaeological investigations ==
Plan of the tomb, made by Piet de Jong under the direction of Alan Wace in 1920–1922

The existence of the Kato Phournos tholos was known before the first major excavations at Mycenae, led by Heinrich Schliemann and Panagiotis Stamatakis, in 1876. (Note: Antonaccio 1995, p. 36. On Stamatakis, see Vasilikou 2011, p. 79.) The first recorded sighting of it was made by the antiquary William Gell, who visited Mycenae in 1805, though he mistook it (and the nearby Epano Phournos tomb) for gates. It was also noted by the scientific delegation of the French Morea expedition, which visited Greece in 1829.

As with the other tholoi at Mycenae, the Kato Phournos tholos was not discovered intact, but had been looted in antiquity. It was excavated by Christos Tsountas in 1893; he recovered a large number of terracotta female figurines, dating to the archaic period (c. 700 – 479 BCE). (Note: Wace 1923, p. 320; Antonaccio 1995, p. 36. For the absolute dates, see Whitley 2001, p. 167.) (Note: Wace gives the figurines as having the inventory number 3071 in the National Archaeological Museum of Athens: this number is in fact attached to part of a Mycenaean phi-type figurine.) In 1922, Wace re-excavated the tomb's dromos and chamber, and investigated Tsountas's spoil heaps, though he did not excavate the grave-pit through lack of time. He discovered another archaic terracotta female figurine in the dromos. Other finds in the dromos consisted of seventeen sherds of Palace Style storage jars (amphorae), made on Crete and contemporary with the Late Helladic II period (c. 1635/1600 – c. 1420/1410 BCE); two fragments of small cups, dating to the Late Helladic II; and fifty other sherds of Late Helladic material, mostly dating to the Late Helladic III period (c. 1420/1410 – c. 1075/1050 BCE). (Note: Wace 1923, p. 324. For the absolute dates, see Manning 2010, p. 28.)

In the chamber, Wace excavated two further sherds from Palace Style amphorae, one of which originally came from the same vessel as some of those in the dromos, and a small piece of a Late Helladic II vase. In Tsountas's spoil heaps, he additionally discovered sixteen more sherds from Palace Style amphorae, twenty-eight fragments of small Late Helladic II vessels, six fragments of coarseware that he considered to date to the Late Helladic II, and sixty-one additional sherds from the Late Helladic, mostly dated to the Late Helladic III. In his notebook, Wace recorded finding three additional sherds: he considered these to have been made after the Mycenaean period, and Carla Antonaccio suggests that they may have been Protocorinthian (c. 720 – c. 630 BCE) and classical (c. 480 – c. 323 BCE) in date. (Note: Antonaccio 1995, p. 36. For the absolute dates, see Hasaki 2021, p. 78, table 3.4 and Sparkes 1991, p. 31.)

== Bibliography ==
- Antonaccio, Carla (1995). An Archaeology of Ancestors: Tomb Cult and Hero Cult in Early Greece. Lanham: Rowman & Littlefield. ISBN 0-8476-7941-1.
- Boyd, Michael (2015). "Explaining the Mortuary Sequence at Mycenae". In Schallin, Ann-Louise; Tournavitou, Iphiyenia (eds.). Mycenaeans up to Date: The Archaeology of the North-eastern Peloponnese ― Current Concepts and New Directions. Skrifter utgivna av Svenska Institutet i Athen, 4th series. Vol. 56. Stockholm: Swedish Institute at Athens. pp. 432–447. ISBN 978-91-7916-063-0.
- Cavanagh, William (2008). "Death and the Mycenaeans". In Shelmerdine, Cynthia (ed.). The Cambridge Companion to the Aegean Bronze Age. Cambridge University Press. pp. 327–341. doi:10.1017/CCOL9780521814447.015. ISBN 978-1-139-00189-2.
- Hasaki, Eleni (2021). Potters at Work in Ancient Corinth: Industry, Religion and the Penteskouphia Pinakes. Princeton: American School of Classical Studies at Athens. ISBN 978-0-87661-553-9.
- Manning, Stuart (2010). "Chronology and Terminology". In Cline, Eric (ed.). The Oxford Handbook of the Bronze Age Aegean. Oxford University Press. pp. 11–30. ISBN 978-0-19-536550-4.
- Maravelia, Amanda-Alice (2001). "The Orientations of the Nine Tholos Tombs at Mycenae". Archaeoastronomy. Journal for the History of Astronomy Supplement 33. 27: S63–S66. doi:10.1177/002182860203302705.
- Mason, David J. (2007). "The Location of the Treasury of Atreus". Oxford Journal of Archaeology. 26 (1): 35–52. doi:10.1111/j.1468-0092.2007.00272.x.
- McDonald, William; Thomas, Carol G. (1990) [1967]. Progress into the Past: The Rediscovery of Mycenaean Civilisation (2nd ed.). Bloomington and Indianapolis: Indiana University Press. ISBN 978-0-253-33627-9.
- Mee, Christopher (2010). "Death and Burial". In Cline, Eric (ed.). The Oxford Handbook of the Bronze Age Aegean. Oxford University Press. pp. 277–290. ISBN 978-0-19-536550-4.
- Moore, Dudley; Rowlands, Edward; Karadimas, Nektarios (2014). In Search of Agamemnon: Early Travellers to Mycenae. Newcastle upon Tyne: Cambridge Scholars Publishing. ISBN 978-1-4438-5776-5.
- Papadimitriou, Nikolas (2015). "The Formation and Use of Dromoi in Early Mycenaean Tombs". The Annual of the British School at Athens. 110 (1): 71–120. JSTOR 44082107.
- Sparkes, Brian A. (1991). Greek Pottery: An Introduction. Manchester University Press. ISBN 0-7190-2236-3.
- Vasilikou, Dora (2011). Το χρονικό της ανασκαφής των Μυκηνών, 1870–1878 [The Chronology of the Excavation of Mycenae, 1870–1878] (PDF) (in Greek). Athens: Archaeological Society of Athens. ISBN 978-960-8145-87-0.
- Voutsaki, Sofia (1998). "Mortuary Evidence, Symbolic Meanings and Social Change: A Comparison Between Messenia and the Argolid in the Mycenaean Period". In Branigan, Keith (ed.). Cemetery and Society in the Aegean Bronze Age. Sheffield Studies in Aegean Archaeology. Sheffield Academic Press. pp. 41–58. ISBN 1-85075-822-0.
- Wace, Alan (1923). "Excavations at Mycenae § IX — The Tholos Tombs". The Annual of the British School at Athens. 25: 283–402. doi:10.1017/S0068245400010352. S2CID 183795426.
- Whitley, James (2001). The Archaeology of Ancient Greece. Cambridge University Press. ISBN 0-521-62733-8.
