= Epano Phournos tholos =

Bronze Age tholos tomb at Mycenae, Greece

- Επάνω Φούρνος (Greek)
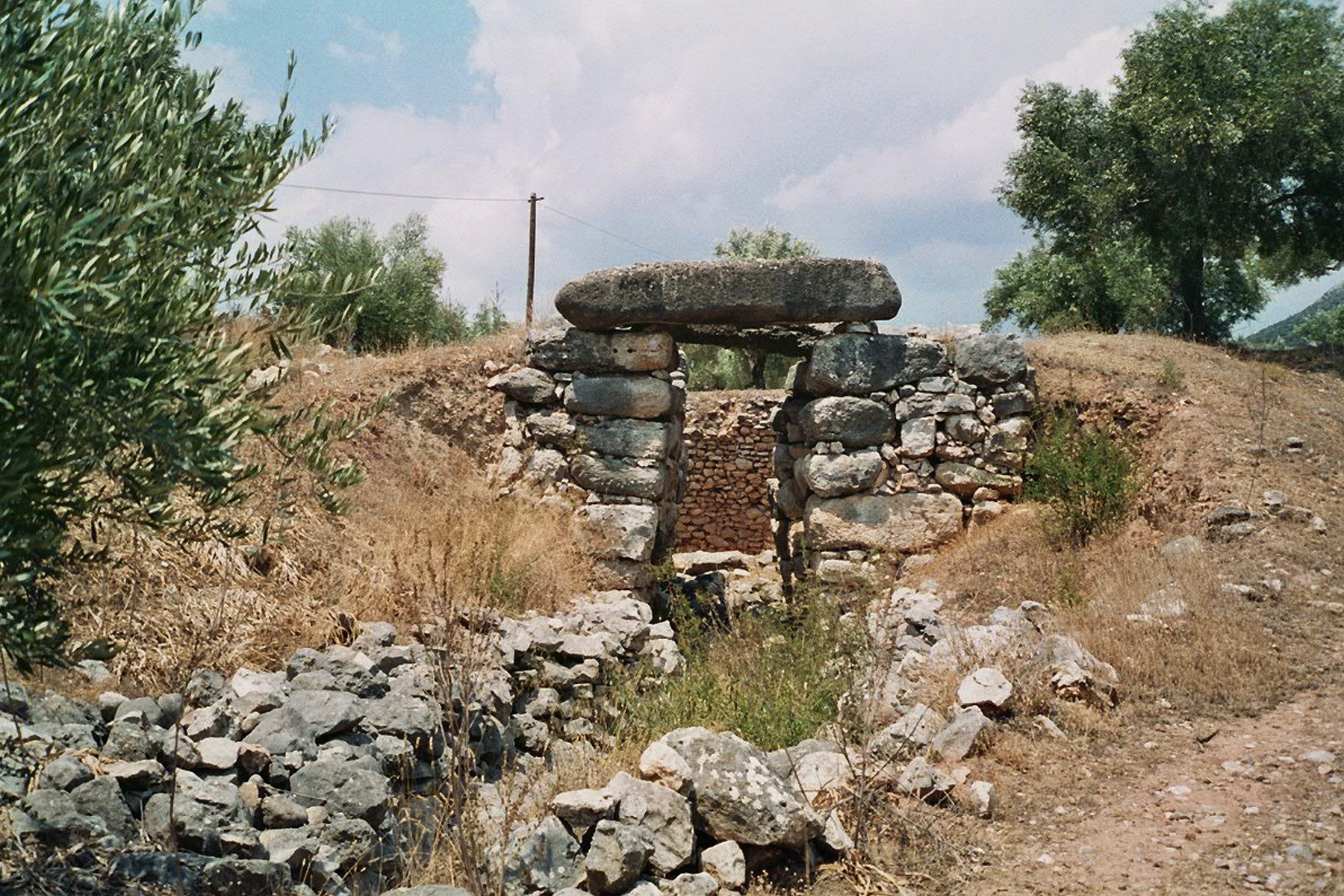
- The tomb's stomion (entrance), viewed from the dromos, in 2005

- Location of the Epano Phournos tholos in the Peloponnese
- 37°43′42″N 22°45′07″E
- Type: Mycenaean tholos tomb
- Periods: Late Helladic IIA
- Location: Mycenae, Argolis, Greece

Site notes
- Archaeologists: Christos Tsountas; Alan Wace; Sinclair Hood
- Public access: Yes

UNESCO World Heritage Site
- Designated: 1999
- Part of: Archaeological Sites of Mycenae and Tiryns
- Reference no.: 941

The Epano Phournos tholos (Note: Greek: Επάνω Φούρνος, romanised: Epano Fournos, lit. 'Upper Lime-Kiln'. The name originated from the mistaken identification of the tomb's ruins for a lime-kiln.) is a Mycenaean tholos tomb at the Bronze Age site of Mycenae in southern Greece. It is one of the earliest tholos tombs (tholoi) at the site, dating to the Late Helladic IIA period (c. 1635/1600 – c. 1480/1470 BCE). Like other examples of the type, it consisted of a round burial chamber surmounted by a corbelled roof, itself entered by a narrow rectangular passage known as the dromos. Unlike later and more elaborate tombs, the dromos was not reinforced with masonry, nor were the stones used to construct the tomb shaped during the building process.

The tomb was looted in antiquity, possibly before the end of the Bronze Age, and little evidence of its original contents survived for modern study. It seems to have been used for only one act of interment: the grave goods recovered included Palace Style vessels from Minoan Crete, goods made of ivory, gold and precious stones, and possibly a boar's tusk helmet. The tomb furnished large amounts of material dating to after the Mycenaean period, particularly from the Geometric period (c. 900 – c. 700 BCE), which has been taken as evidence of hero cult (the use of the tomb as a site of worship for legendary or deified ancestors).

The tomb's existence was first recorded by the antiquary William Gell following a visit to Mycenae in 1805, though Gell mistook it for the remains of a gate. Christos Tsountas cleared the dromos, the front of the entrance (stomion), and parts of the chamber in 1892, by which point the doorway's inner left jamb had collapsed. Alan Wace re-cleared the dromos and partially excavated the stomion in 1922, and completed the excavation of the chamber in 1950, following the repair of the collapsed entrance by the Greek Archaeological Service.

== Description ==
The Epano Phournos tholos is a Mycenaean tholos tomb. Tholos tombs, or tholoi, are a form of monumental burial that originated in Messenia, in southwest Greece, at the end of the Middle Helladic III period (that is, c. 1700 – c. 1675 BCE). They may have developed as a more monumental version of the burial mounds, or tumuli, used in mainland Greece throughout the Middle Helladic period; they may also have been influenced by similar styles of built tombs used in Minoan Crete.

Tholoi consist of a narrow rectangular entrance passage, known as the dromos, which leads into an underground burial chamber, separated from the dromos by an entrance-way called the stomion, which would usually be sealed with a dry-stone wall. The walls of the chamber, and sometimes the dromos, were lined with dry-stone masonry. The chamber was capped with a rounded roof constructed by the technique of corbelling, by which courses of blocks were overlapped in increasingly small circles. They were typically used for multiple burials, perhaps of members of the same family, and many were periodically re-opened for additional interments and for ritual activity.

During the Late Bronze Age, a total of nine tholoi were constructed at Mycenae. The Epano Phournos tomb dates to the Late Helladic IIA period (c. 1635/1600 – c. 1480/1470 BCE), the first period in which the tombs were constructed at the site. (Note: Mee 2010, p. 286; Boyd 2015, p. 438. For the absolute dates, see Manning 2010, p. 28.) It is located approximately 450 m (490 yd) west-southwest of the citadel of Mycenae, near the crest of the Panagia Ridge.

The tomb's construction is of a similar style to the nearby Cyclopean Tomb, a tholos tomb of approximately the same date. Like the Cyclopean Tomb, the Epano Phournos tomb is constructed from undressed pieces of stone, which are used throughout the chamber and stomion. The tomb's dromos is 10 metres (33 ft) in length and 4–5 metres (13–16 ft) wide; it is cut from the bedrock with no supporting masonry. The stomion is 4.5 metres (15 ft) high, 2 metres (6.6 ft) wide, and 5 metres (16 ft) deep. It was originally capped with five lintel blocks of conglomerate, which showed no sign of having been worked; it shows no evidence of a relieving triangle, (Note: A triangular void placed above the lintel to relieve pressure upon it.) found in later tholoi at Mycenae.

The tomb's chamber had collapsed by the time it was investigated; this possibly took place during the Bronze Age, since all the dateable material found at the bottom of the debris was Mycenaean, and had certainly occurred by the Geometric period. It is around 11 metres (36 ft) in diameter; Alan Wace estimates that it would originally have been around 10 metres (33 ft) high. The chamber floor was originally covered with a pavement of white pebbles.

== Contents ==
Plan of the tomb, made by Piet de Jong under the direction of Alan Wace in 1920–1922. At this point the chamber was mostly unexcavated.

As with the other tholoi at Mycenae, the Epano Phournos tholos was not discovered intact, but had been looted in antiquity. Finds of pottery from the Late Helladic III period (c. 1420/1410 – c. 1075/1050 BCE) close to the tomb floor suggest that it may have already been robbed in this period. (Note: Wace, Hood & Cook 1953, p. 83. For the dates of Late Helladic III, see Manning 2010, p. 23.) The chamber floor was covered with small, rectangular pits, which the excavators interpreted as attempts by grave-robbers to find burial pits. No evidence of actual burial pits has been found in the tomb: it is likely that any burials made there were placed on the chamber floor. There was also no evidence of repeated use, as was common in tholos tombs outside Mycenae, leading Sinclair Hood, who participated in the excavation of the tomb, to suggest that it may have been used only once.

The stomion contained remains of a Palace Style storage vessel (amphora), made on Crete and contemporary with the early part of the Late Helladic II period, as well as two beads (one of amethyst and one of quartz), a small piece of ivory, and some gold leaf. Wace (who led the excavation) and Hood interpreted these as loot from the chamber dropped and left by grave-robbers. The excavators also found twenty-two sherds of pottery dating to Late Helladic II (c. 1635/1600 – c. 1420/1410 BCE), around fifty from Late Helladic III, (Note: Wace, Hood & Cook 1953, p. 69. For the absolute dates of the Late Helladic II, see Manning 2010, p. 28.) part of a human jawbone and small pieces of gold; the latter and the bone were interpreted as originating in the chamber. A clay spool, possibly of Mycenaean date, was also recovered from the stomion.

The chamber furnished fragments of at least eight Palace Style amphorae, scraps of gold, human and animal bones, a glass-paste bead and a piece of boar's tusk, which Hood suggested could have come from a boar's tusk helmet. Hood considered all of these to be remains of the tomb's original contents. The chamber also contained sherds of Mycenaean pottery for which it was not possible to definitively establish whether they were part of the original grave goods or represented later material introduced by the collapse of the dome. It was similarly impossible to determine whether fragments of Mycenaean figurines, dating to the Late Helladic III period, and several stems of kylikes, also found in the chamber, had entered via the collapse or been placed in the tomb while it was intact.

=== Post-Mycenaean use ===
A large amount of post-Mycenaean material was recovered from the tomb. James Whitley considers it sufficient to provide evidence of hero cult (the use of the tomb as a site of worship for legendary or deified ancestors) during the Geometric and Archaic periods (the latter dating to c. 700 – 479 BCE). (Note: Whitley 1988, p. 178. For the absolute dates, see Whitley 2001, p. 167.) Eighty-eight pieces of post-Mycenaean pottery, mostly dating to the Geometric period (c. 900 – c. 700 BCE), were recovered during excavations of the stomion. (Note: Wace, Hood & Cook 1953, p. 69. For the dates of the Geometric Period, see Cosmopoulos 2015, p. 167.) A terracotta head from a statuette of a warrior, dating to the Archaic period, was found on the floor of the stomion: Hood wrote that this had been interpreted as the remains of cultic activity at the tomb. He also suggested that fragments of lead plate, found in the same place, could have been left as votive offerings, pointing to parallels known from Sparta and other sites.

Sherds of pottery from the Geometric period, as well as a few later pieces, including black-glazed pottery of the fifth and fourth centuries BCE and a sherd of West Slope Ware from the succeeding Hellenistic period, were found in the upper strata of the collapsed chamber. Wace and his team interpreted this as evidence that the resulting hollow was used in antiquity as a rubbish-dump. Susan Alcock suggests that some may have been placed as dedications in the hollow left by the collapse of the tomb's chamber.

The outer block of the tomb's lintel had two rectangular cuttings, about 30 by 15 centimetres (11.8 by 5.9 in) in area and a few centimetres deep, made into its upper surface. Wace and Hood observed that these must have been made either before the construction of the upper façade, which sat atop the lintels, or after the collapse of the tomb; if the latter, they suggested that they may have been intended to hold the bases of stelai or statues used in cult practice. (Note: Alcock notes that other archaeologists consider the cuttings too small for this purpose.)

== Archaeological investigations ==
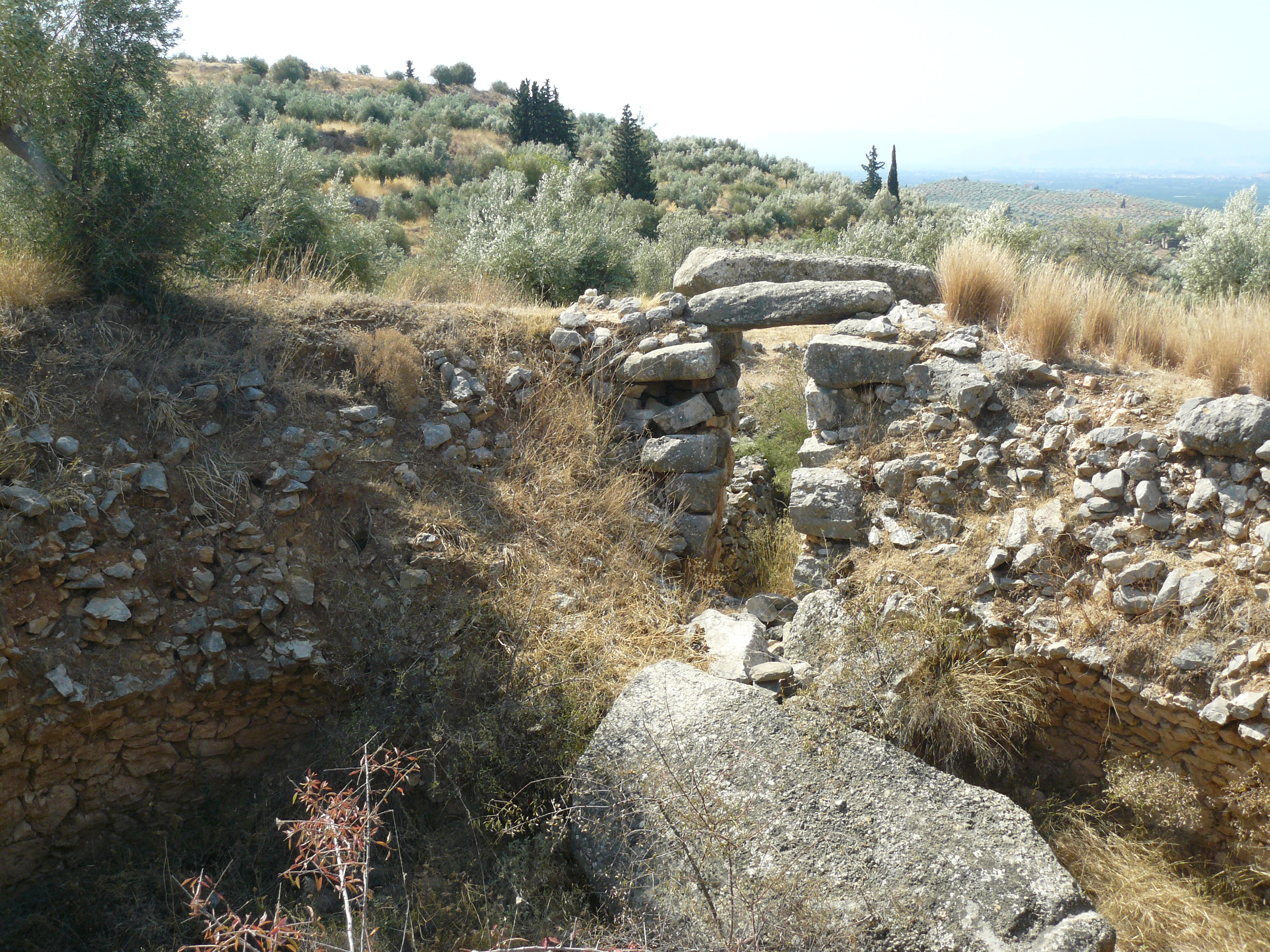
View across the top of the chamber, showing the stomion with lintel blocks

The existence of the Epano Phournos tholos was known before the first major excavations at Mycenae, led by Heinrich Schliemann and Panagiotis Stamatakis, in 1876. (Note: Wace, Hood & Cook 1953, p. 69. On Stamatakis, see Vasilikou 2011, p. 79.) The first recorded sighting of it was made by the antiquary William Gell, who visited Mycenae in 1805, though he mistook it (and the nearby Kato Phournos tomb) for gates. The soldier and antiquary William Martin Leake noted seeing it during his visit of 1806. (Note: Wace, Hood & Cook 1953, p. 69. For the date, see Moore, Rowlands & Karadimas 2014, p. 74.)

The dromos, the front of the stomion, and the centre of the chamber were cleared by Christos Tsountas in June–December 1892. By this time, the doorway's inner left jamb had collapsed. Tsountas did not record any finds from the tomb, nor did any from it enter the National Archaeological Museum in Athens following his excavations. Later excavations found evidence that his workers had cleared a small area in the south-west of the chamber: when it was investigated in 1950, it contained part of a glass wine-bottle, a worker's axe-blade, and a Greek coin of George I from 1882.

A team led by Wace re-cleared the dromos and partially excavated the stomion in 1922. Wace intended to excavate the tomb completely during his campaigns at Mycenae between 1920 and 1922, but the tomb was considered too unsafe to do so, as one of the tomb's lintel blocks had fallen across the collapsed jamb, blocking the entrance, and the chamber itself was unstable. Restoration work by the Greek Archaeological Service before 1939 returned the fallen lintel to its original position, supporting it with timber. Further restoration by the Service, authorised by Anastasios Orlandos and John Papadimitriou in the early summer of 1950 during work on the Tomb of Clytemnestra, cleared the fallen material in the entrance and reinforced the lintel with an additional piece of timber.

A team led by Wace excavated the remainder of the tomb in 1950, following the restoration work: the excavation took place between 11 and 22 July, with a team of 6–8 excavators, as well as a member of the Archaeological Service team who had carried out the restoration to advise on safety. The edge of the chamber was left unexcavated, as the unstable wall made work there too dangerous.

== Bibliography ==
- Alcock, Susan E. (1991). "Tomb Cult and the Post-Classical Polis". American Journal of Archaeology. 95 (3): 447–467. doi:10.2307/505491. JSTOR 505491.
- Antonaccio, Carla (1995). An Archaeology of Ancestors: Tomb Cult and Hero Cult in Early Greece. Lanham: Rowman & Littlefield. ISBN 0-8476-7941-1.
- Boyd, Michael (2015). "Explaining the Mortuary Sequence at Mycenae". In Schallin, Ann-Louise; Tournavitou, Iphiyenia (eds.). Mycenaeans up to Date: The Archaeology of the North-eastern Peloponnese ― Current Concepts and New Directions. Skrifter utgivna av Svenska Institutet i Athen, 4th series. Vol. 56. Stockholm: Swedish Institute at Athens. pp. 432–447. ISBN 978-91-7916-063-0.
- Cavanagh, William (2008). "Death and the Mycenaeans". In Shelmerdine, Cynthia (ed.). The Cambridge Companion to the Aegean Bronze Age. Cambridge University Press. pp. 327–341. doi:10.1017/CCOL9780521814447.015. ISBN 978-1-139-00189-2.
- Cosmopoulos, Michael B. (2015). Bronze Age Eleusis and the Origins of the Eleusinian Mysteries. Cambridge University Press. doi:10.1017/CBO9780511820700. ISBN 978-1-107-01099-4.
- Loader, N. Claire (1998). Building in Cyclopean Masonry: With Special Reference to the Mycenaean Fortifications on Mainland Greece. Jonsered: P. Åström. ISBN 91-7081-140-7.
- Manning, Stuart (2010). "Chronology and Terminology". In Cline, Eric (ed.). The Oxford Handbook of the Bronze Age Aegean. Oxford University Press. pp. 11–30. ISBN 978-0-19-536550-4.
- Maravelia, Amanda-Alice (2001). "The Orientations of the Nine Tholos Tombs at Mycenae". Archaeoastronomy. Journal for the History of Astronomy Supplement 33. 33 (27): S63–S66. doi:10.1177/002182860203302705.
- Mason, David J. (2007). "The Location of the Treasury of Atreus". Oxford Journal of Archaeology. 26 (1): 35–52. doi:10.1111/j.1468-0092.2007.00272.x.
- McDonald, William; Thomas, Carol G. (1990) [1967]. Progress into the Past: The Rediscovery of Mycenaean Civilisation (2nd ed.). Bloomington and Indianapolis: Indiana University Press. ISBN 978-0-253-33627-9.
- Mee, Christopher (2010). "Death and Burial". In Cline, Eric (ed.). The Oxford Handbook of the Bronze Age Aegean. Oxford University Press. pp. 277–290. ISBN 978-0-19-536550-4.
- Moore, Dudley; Rowlands, Edward; Karadimas, Nektarios (2014). In Search of Agamemnon: Early Travellers to Mycenae. Newcastle upon Tyne: Cambridge Scholars Publishing. ISBN 978-1-4438-5776-5.
- Papadimitriou, Nikolas (2015). "The Formation and Use of Dromoi in Early Mycenaean Tombs". The Annual of the British School at Athens. 110 (1): 71–120. doi:10.1017/S0068245415000052. JSTOR 44082107.
- Tsountas, Christos (1894). Ἑνδεκάτη ἀνασκαφὴ ἐν Μυκἠγαις, ἐπιστατοῦντος τοῦ Ἐφόρου ἀρχαιοτἠτων Χρ. Τσούντα [Eleventh Excavation at Mycenae, Overseen by the Ephor of Antiquities Christos Tsountas] (PDF). Πρακτικά Της Εν Αθήναις Αρχαιολογικής Εταιρείας [Proceedings of the Archaeological Society of Athens] (in Greek): 56–58.
- Vasilikou, Dora (2011). Το χρονικό της ανασκαφής των Μυκηνών, 1870–1878 [The Chronology of the Excavation of Mycenae, 1870–1878] (PDF) (in Greek). Athens: Archaeological Society of Athens. ISBN 978-960-8145-87-0.
- Voutsaki, Sofia (1998). "Mortuary Evidence, Symbolic Meanings and Social Change: A Comparison Between Messenia and the Argolid in the Mycenaean Period". In Branigan, Keith (ed.). Cemetery and Society in the Aegean Bronze Age. Sheffield Studies in Aegean Archaeology. Sheffield Academic Press. pp. 41–58. ISBN 1-85075-822-0.
- Wace, Alan (1923). "Excavations at Mycenae § IX — The Tholos Tombs". The Annual of the British School at Athens. 25: 283–402. doi:10.1017/S0068245400010352. S2CID 183795426.
- Wace, Alan; Hood, M. Sinclair; Cook, John Manuel (1953). "The Epano Phournos Tholos Tomb". The Annual of the British School at Athens. Mycenae 1939–1952. 48: 19–29. doi:10.1017/S0068245400012466. JSTOR 30096964.
- Whitley, James (1988). "Early States and Hero Cults: A Re-Appraisal". The Journal of Hellenic Studies. 108: 173–182. doi:10.2307/632638. JSTOR 632638.
- Whitley, James (2001). The Archaeology of Ancient Greece. Cambridge University Press. ISBN 0-521-62733-8.
