= List of tholos tombs at Mycenae =

Map of Late Bronze Age burial sites at Mycenae, showing the nine tholos tombs

During the Late Bronze Age, nine tholos tombs were constructed at the site of Mycenae in southern Greece, which gives its name to Mycenaean civilisation. Tholos tombs, or tholoi, are a form of monumental burial that originated in Messenia, in southwest Greece, at the end of the Middle Helladic III period (that is, c. 1700 – c. 1675 BCE). They may have developed as a more monumental version of the burial mounds, or tumuli, used in mainland Greece throughout the Middle Helladic period; they may also have been influenced by similar styles of built tombs used in Minoan Crete.

Tholoi consist of a narrow rectangular entrance passage, known as the dromos, which leads into an underground burial chamber, separated from the dromos by an entrance-way called the stomion, which would usually be sealed with a dry-stone wall. The walls of the chamber, and sometimes the dromos, were lined with dry-stone masonry. The chamber was capped with a rounded roof constructed by the technique of corbelling, by which courses of blocks were overlapped in increasingly small circles. They were typically used for multiple burials, perhaps of members of the same family, and many were periodically re-opened for additional interments and for ritual activity.

Until the Late Helladic I period (c. 1700/1675 – c. 1635/1600 BCE), (Note: Boyd 2015, p. 438. For the absolute dates, see Manning 2010, p. 23.) the most elaborate form of elite burial at Mycenae was in shaft graves. The tholoi at Mycenae are slightly predated by the earliest chamber tombs at the site, which date to the Late Helladic I period and share the same tripartite structure of chamber, dromos and stomion. (Note: Boyd 2015, p. 438. For the structure of chamber tombs, see Mee 2010, p. 285. For the absolute dates, see Manning 2010, p. 23.) The earliest tholoi were constructed in the Late Helladic IIA period (c. 1635/1600 – c. 1480/1470 BCE), in which shaft graves ceased to be used, and remained the most monumental form of burial used at Mycenae throughout the Mycenaean period. (Note: Mee 2010, p. 286; Boyd 2015, p. 438. For the absolute dates, see Manning 2010, p. 28.) Chamber tombs continued to be constructed alongside them, often grouped around tholoi; around three hundred are known from the site.

At Mycenae, tholos tombs replaced shaft graves as the most elaborate form of elite burial in the Late Helladic II period (c. 1635/1600 – c. 1420/1410 BCE). (Note: Mee 2010, p. 286. For the absolute dates, see Manning 2010, p. 28.) The nine tholoi are geographically concentrated into two groups on either side of the Panagia ridge: five to the west and four to the east. Those to the east – known as the Tomb of Aegisthus, the Lion Tomb, the Treasury of Atreus and the Tomb of Clytemnestra (Note: The names traditionally given to the tombs are modern; they variously reflect the tombs' locations, their building materials, objects found in them, and members of the mythical ruling house of Mycenae.) – are larger, more elaborate and closer to the settlement of Mycenae; these are often interpreted as the tombs of Mycenae's rulers. It has also been argued that tholos tombs were reasonably widely available to elites in the Late Helladic II period, and became increasingly restricted in Late Helladic III c. 1420/1410 – c. 1075/1050 BCE) with the rise of the development of a centralised state, termed "palatial", based at Mycenae. (Note: Voutsaki 1995, p. 62. For the absolute dates, see Manning 2010, p. 23.)

None of the tholoi at Mycenae were discovered intact, having been looted in antiquity, probably during the Iron Age. Some were visible into the classical period; the second-century CE traveller Pausanias described seeing underground treasuries and the tombs of the mythological Agamemnon, Aegisthus and Clytemnestra; at least some of these were probably tholos tombs, though it is unclear which ones. In the early nineteenth century, the tombs were seen and visited by European travellers: Lord Elgin and his wife Mary Bruce visited in May 1802, and crawled into the Treasury of Atreus, while William Gell and Edward Dodwell visited in 1804 and 1805 respectively and made notes on the remains. The first modern excavations took place under Heinrich Schliemann and Panagiotis Stamatakis in 1876; (Note: Antonaccio 1995, p. 32. On Stamatakis, see Vasilikou 2011, p. 79.) these concentrated on the vicinity of the Lion Gate (the main entrance to the acropolis) but included a brief exploration of the Tomb of Clytemnestra directed by Schliemann's wife, Sophia. Christos Tsountas, who excavated widely at Mycenae between 1886 and 1910, (Note: Voutsaki 2017, p. 130; Masouridi 2017, p. 148. For the dates, see Shelton 2006, p. 159.) discovered the Tomb of Aegisthus, the Panagia tholos and the Tomb of the Genii, and carried out additional excavations in the Cyclopean Tomb, the Tomb of Clytemnestra, and the Epano Phournos tholos. In 1920–1922, an expedition led by Alan Wace excavated the Tomb of Aegisthus, cleared parts of other tombs, and drew up plans of all nine tholoi. Later archaeological work, continuing into the 1950s, was carried out by Wace and the Greek Archaeological Service, the latter including John Papadimitriou.

== List of tholos tombs ==
Tholos tombs of Mycenae
Name	Image	Period (Approx. dates BCE)	Dromos length	Chamber diameter	Description	Excavations
Cyclopean Tomb	Ancient ruins: circular courses of dry stones, packed on top of each other, all of various sizes and shapes.	Late Helladic IIA(1635/1600 – 1480/1470)	12–13 m (39–43 ft)	8 m (26 ft)	Located approximately 600 m (660 yd) west-southwest of the citadel of Mycenae. Constructed of undressed stones, of various sizes, in the chamber and stomion; the dromos is without masonry. Alan Wace considered it "of a very primitive type" in design and construction.	Known at the time of Heinrich Schliemann's first excavations of Mycenae in 1876. The tomb was cleared by Christos Tsountas in 1891. In 1922, Wace examined material from the fill of the dromos and chamber, including Tsountas's spoil heaps.
Epano Phournos	Ancient ruins: a tall rectangular doorway with a narrow, bent passageway approaching it, all made of stacked limestone rocks.	Late Helladic IIA(1635/1600 – 1480/1470)	10 m (33 ft)	11 m (36 ft)	Located approximately 450 m (490 yd) west-southwest of the citadel of Mycenae, near the crest of the Panagia Ridge. Constructed of undressed stone pieces in the chamber, dromos and stomion.	Known at the time of Schliemann's first excavations of Mycenae in 1876. The dromos, the front of the stomion, and the centre of the chamber were cleared by Tsountas in the 1890s. Wace re-cleared the dromos and partially excavated the stomion in 1922, and excavated the remainder of the tomb in 1950.
Tomb of Aegisthus	Ancient ruins: a tall rectangular doorway at the end of a broad passageway: the doorway itself is made of large, regular cut blocks; the structures around it of more varied stones.	Late Helladic IIA(1635/1600 – 1480/1470)	22.45 m (73.7 ft)	13.96 m (45.8 ft)	Located approximately 70 m (230 ft) west of the citadel of Mycenae. The largest tholos tomb in the Aegean at the time of its construction, (Note: Galanakis 2007, p. 240: it is the fourth largest overall, the three larger being Atreus, Clytemnestra, and the Treasury of Minyas at Orchomenos in Boeotia. All three date to the end of LH IIIA or early LH IIIB.) and the earliest to feature a relieving triangle. (Note: A triangular void placed above the lintel to relieve pressure upon it.) The façade of the stomion is faced with dressed blocks of ashlar, common in later tholoi but previously unknown, which may have been added after the initial building of the tomb. (Note: Galanakis 2007, p. 244. On the possible phases of construction, see Wace 1923, p. 300; Loader 1998, p. 158; and Galanakis 2007, p. 255.)	Discovered, but not excavated, by Tsountas in 1892. (Note: The tomb may have been noticed earlier, by Friedrich Gottlieb Welcker, during his travels through Greece in 1843.) Partially excavated by Tsountas in 1893, and in 1922 by Winifred Lamb as part of Wace's campaign at Mycenae. The final parts of the chamber were cleared under John Papadimitriou in 1955.
Kato Phournos	Ancient ruins: from the inside, a tall rectangular doorway in the middle of a round chamber. The chamber is constructed of stacked stones, some worked; the doorway is of worked and polished stone blocks.	Late Helladic IIA(1635/1600 – 1480/1470)	12 m (39 ft)	10 m (33 ft)	Located approximately 600 m (660 yd) west of the citadel of Mycenae. The dromos was lined with ashlar blocks, bonded together with stucco. The burial chamber was originally covered by an earthen mound. A burial pit was found in the floor of the chamber.	Known to early travellers to Mycenae, and excavated by Tsountas in 1892. Tsountas's excavation was never published; Wace re-excavated the dromos and chamber in 1922, except for the burial pit.
Panagia	Ancient ruins: a heavily overgrown narrow passageway of rough stone, leading to a doorway of regular cut stone blocks. Inside the doorway can be seen a round chamber, its roof collapsed.	Late Helladic IIA(1635/1600 – 1480/1470)	12 m (39 ft)	8 m (26 ft)	Located approximately 500 m (550 yd) southwest of the citadel of Mycenae. The dromos is lined in rubble, transitioning to ashlar masonry towards the stomion, which has a relieving triangle. The chamber is built of worked limestone blocks, bonded with clay.	Discovered and excavated by Tsountas in 1887. Wace re-cleared the tomb in 1922 and searched Tsountas's spoil heaps. Named for the modern chapel of the Panagia in its vicinity.
Lion	Ancient ruins: a wide passageway, partly collapsed, built of large, regular, cut stone blocks. In front is a large doorway of polished blocks of the same large size, leading to a circular chamber.	Late Helladic IIA(1635/1600 – 1480/1470)	22 m (72 ft)	14 m (46 ft)	Located approximately 100 m (110 yd) north-northwest of the citadel of Mycenae. The dromos was lined with ashlar masonry, the masonry of the stomion is dressed and a mixture of poros stone and limestone conglomerate. The chamber may originally have been surmounted by an earthen mound.	Excavated by Tsountas in 1896, but known much earlier. The first recorded identification of the tomb was made by William Gell, who visited Mycenae in 1804. Wace re-cleared the dromos and chamber in 1922.
Tomb of the Genii	Ancient ruins: looking down a straight passageway at a doorway built of regular, polished stone blocks, surmounted by a triangular void. The passageway is constructed of rough stacked stones.	Late Helladic IIB – IIIA1 early(1480/1470 – 1405/1390)	16.6 m (54 ft)	8.4 m (28 ft)	Located approximately 600 m (660 yd) west of the citadel of Mycenae. The lower course of stone in the dromos is ashlar masonry, with rubble work above. The stomion is constructed of ashlar and includes a relieving triangle. The dome of the chamber is constructed of worked blocks, curved on their inward faces.	Discovered and excavated by Tsountas in 1896. The tomb is named for a series of glass-paste plaques, showing figures identified as genii pouring libations, found in the chamber.
Treasury of Atreus	Ancient ruins: a wide passageway of large, cut, polished stone blocks, leading to a doorway with a triangular void on top. The chamber behind is intact, and appears dark to the viewer.	Late Helladic IIIA2 late – IIIB1 early(1360/1345 – 1265/1120)	36 m (118 ft)	14.5 m (48 ft)	Located approximately 500 m (550 yd) south-southwest of the citadel. The largest and most elaborate of the known Mycenaean tholos tombs. Its façade was elaborately decorated, including columns and other decorative features in marble. The burial chamber includes a side chamber, a feature otherwise unknown in mainland tholoi apart from the Treasury of Minyas at Orchomenos in Boeotia, built to the same template as Atreus.	Partially cleared after the visit of Lord and Lady Elgin in May 1802. Veli Pasha, Ottoman governor of the Morea, cleared the entrance-way in 1810 and removed the decorative marbles from the façade. Partially excavated by Schliemann in 1876, and by Panagiotis Stamatakis in 1876–1879. Excavated by Wace in 1920, 1921, 1939, and 1955.
Tomb of Clytemnestra	Ancient ruins: a wide passageway of large, cut, polished stone blocks, leading to a doorway with a triangular void on top. The chamber behind is intact, and appears dark to the viewer.	Late Helladic IIIA2 late – IIIB1 early(1360/1345 – 1265/1120)	37 m (121 ft)	15.52 m (50.9 ft)	Immediately to the west of the Tomb of Aegisthus, and adjacent to Grave Circle B, used for monumental burials in the Middle Helladic III and Late Helladic I periods. The façade was decorated with gypsum half-columns, with ornate capitals and vertical fluting. The chamber was originally covered with a large earthen mound, reinforced by a stone wall known as the "Great Poros Wall".	Partially excavated by Sophia Schliemann in 1876, by which point the dome had already been destroyed, probably by Veli Pasha in the early nineteenth century. Excavated completely by Tsountas over three campaigns in 1891, 1892 and 1897. The Great Poros Wall was excavated in 1952 and 1953 by Sinclair Hood, under the direction of Wace.

== Bibliography ==
- Antonaccio, Carla (1995). An Archaeology of Ancestors: Tomb Cult and Hero Cult in Early Greece. Lanham: Rowman & Littlefield. ISBN 0-8476-7941-1.
- Boyd, Michael (2015). "Explaining the Mortuary Sequence at Mycenae". In Schallin, Ann-Louise; Tournavitou, Iphiyenia (eds.). Mycenaeans up to Date: The Archaeology of the North-eastern Peloponnese ― Current Concepts and New Directions. Skrifter utgivna av Svenska Institutet i Athen, 4th series. Vol. 56. Stockholm: Swedish Institute at Athens. pp. 432–447. ISBN 978-91-7916-063-0.
- Castleden, Rodney (2005). The Mycenaeans. London and New York: Routledge. ISBN 0-415-36336-5 – via Internet Archive.
- Cavanagh, William (2008). "Death and the Mycenaeans". In Shelmerdine, Cynthia (ed.). The Cambridge Companion to the Aegean Bronze Age. Cambridge University Press. pp. 327–341. doi:10.1017/CCOL9780521814447.015. ISBN 978-1-139-00189-2.
- Fitzsimons, Rodney (2007). "Architecture and Power in the Bronze Age Argolid". In Bretschneider, Joachim; Driessen, Jan; Van Lerberghe, Karel (eds.). Power and Architecture: Monumental Public Architecture in the Bronze Age Near East and Aegean. Orientalia Lovaniensia Analecta. Leuven: Peeters. pp. 93–116. ISBN 978-90-429-1831-3.
- French, Elizabeth (2012). "Mycenae". In Cline, Eric (ed.). The Oxford Handbook of the Bronze Age Aegean. Oxford University Press. pp. 671–680. ISBN 978-0-19-987360-9.
- Galanakis, Yannis (2007). "The Construction of the Aegisthus Tholos Tomb at Mycenae and the 'Helladic Heresy'". The Annual of the British School at Athens. 102: 239–256. doi:10.1017/S0068245400021481. JSTOR 30245251. S2CID 162590402.
- Higgins, Reynold; Ellis, S.E.; Hope Simpson, Richard (1968). "The Façade of the Treasury of Atreus at Mycenae". The Annual of the British School at Athens. 63: 331–336. doi:10.1017/S0068245400014453. JSTOR 30103198. S2CID 129972305.
- Hope Simpson, Richard (2003). "The Dodecanese and the Ahhiyawa Question". Annual of the British School at Athens. 98: 203–237. JSTOR 30073207.
- Iakovidis, Spyros; French, Elizabeth; Shelton, Kim; Ioannides, Charalambos; Jansen, Anton; Lavery, John (2003). Archaeological Atlas of Mycenae (PDF). Library of the Archaeological Society of Athens. Vol. 229. Athens: Archaeological Society of Athens. ISBN 960-8145-40-6.
- Kvapil, Lynne A. (2018). "(Pre)historiography and Periegesis: Pausanias' Description of Mycenae for a Roman Audience". In Bell, Sinclair W.; Holland, Lora L. (eds.). At the Crossroads of Greco-Roman History, Culture, and Religion: Papers in Memory of Carin M. C. Green. Oxford: Archaeopress. pp. 45–58. ISBN 978-1-78969-013-2.
- Loader, N. Claire (1998). Building in Cyclopean Masonry: With Special Reference to the Mycenaean Fortifications on Mainland Greece. Jonsered: P. Åström. ISBN 91-7081-140-7.
- Loughlin, Thomas (2021). "The Marquess and Mycenae". Archaeology Ireland. 35 (1): 44–48. JSTOR 27075191.
- Manning, Stuart (2010). "Chronology and Terminology". In Cline, Eric (ed.). The Oxford Handbook of the Bronze Age Aegean. Oxford University Press. pp. 11–30. ISBN 978-0-19-536550-4.
- Maravelia, Amanda-Alice (2001). "The Orientations of the Nine Tholos Tombs at Mycenae". Archaeoastronomy. Journal for the History of Astronomy Supplement 33. 27: S63–S66. doi:10.1177/002182860203302705.
- Mason, David J. (2007). "The Location of the Treasury of Atreus". Oxford Journal of Archaeology. 26 (1): 35–52. doi:10.1111/j.1468-0092.2007.00272.x.
- Mason, David J. (2013). "The Date of the Tomb of Clytemnestra". The Annual of the British School at Athens. 108 (1): 97–119. doi:10.1017/S0068245413000014. JSTOR 43188527. S2CID 191384405.
- Masouridi, Stavroula (2017). Χρήστος Τσούντας 1857–1934: Ερευνητικό, δημιουργικό και πειθαρχημένο πνεύμα [Christos Tsountas 1857–1934: Inquisitive, Creative and Disciplined Spirit] (PDF). Θέματα Αρχαιολογίας [Topics in Archaeology] (in Greek). 1 (1): 148–149.
- Mee, Christopher (2010). "Death and Burial". In Cline, Eric (ed.). The Oxford Handbook of the Bronze Age Aegean. Oxford University Press. pp. 277–290. ISBN 978-0-19-536550-4.
- Moore, Dudley; Rowlands, Edward; Karadimas, Nektarios (2014). In Search of Agamemnon: Early Travellers to Mycenae. Newcastle upon Tyne: Cambridge Scholars Publishing. ISBN 978-1-4438-5776-5.
- Orlandos, Anastasios (1955). Γενικὴ ἔκθεσις τοῦ Γραμματέως [Secretary's General Report] (PDF). Πρακτικά της εν Αθήναις Αρχαιολογικής Εταιρείας [Proceedings of the Archaeological Society of Athens] (in Greek): 1–35. Archived from the original (PDF) on 2022-09-22.
- Owens, Gareth (1994). "Was se-to-i-ja at Archanes?". Kadmos. 33 (1): 22–28. doi:10.1515/kadm.1994.33.1.22.
- Papadimitriou, Nikolas (2015). "The Formation and Use of Dromoi in Early Mycenaean Tombs". The Annual of the British School at Athens. 110 (1): 71–120. JSTOR 44082107.
- Schliemann, Heinrich (1878). Mycenae: A Narrative of Researches and Discoveries at Mycenae and Tiryns. London: John Murray. OCLC 1339980582.
- Shelton, Kim (2006). "The Long Lasting Effect of Tsountas on the Study of Mycenae". In Darcque, Pascal; Fotiadis, Michael; Polychronopoulou, Olga (eds.). Mythos: La préhistoire égéenne du XIXe au XXIe siècle après J.-C. Actes de la table ronde internationale d’Athènes (21-2 novembre 2002). Bulletin de Correspondance Hellénique Suppléments. Vol. 46. French School at Athens. pp. 159–164. ISBN 2-86958-195-5.
- Traill, David (2012). "Schliemann's Mycenae Excavations Through the Eyes of Stamatakis" (PDF). In Korres, George Styl; Karadimas, Nektarios; Flouda, George (eds.). Archaeology and Heinrich Schliemann. A Century after his Death. Αssessments and Prospects. Myth – History – Science. Athens: Giorgios Styl Korres. pp. 79–84. ISBN 978-960-93-3929-2.
- Vasilikou, Dora (2011). Το χρονικό της ανασκαφής των Μυκηνών, 1870–1878 [The Chronology of the Excavation of Mycenae, 1870–1878] (PDF) (in Greek). Archaeological Society of Athens. ISBN 978-960-8145-87-0.
- Voutsaki, Sofia (1995). "Social and Political Processes in the Mycenaean Argolid: The Evidence from the Mortuary Practices". In Laffineur, Robert; Niemeier, Wolf-Dietrich (eds.). Politeia: Society and State in the Aegean Bronze Age. Aegeum. Vol. 12. University of Liège. pp. 55–66. OCLC 38010420.
- Voutsaki, Sofia (1998). "Mortuary Evidence, Symbolic Meanings and Social Change: A Comparison Between Messenia and the Argolid in the Mycenaean Period". In Branigan, Keith (ed.). Cemetery and Society in the Aegean Bronze Age. Sheffield Studies in Aegean Archaeology. Sheffield Academic Press. pp. 41–58. ISBN 1-85075-822-0.
- Voutsaki, Sofia (2017). "The Hellenization of the Prehistoric Past: The Search for Greek Identity in the Work of Christos Tsountas". In Voutsaki, Sofia; Cartledge, Paul (eds.). Ancient Monuments and Modern Identities: A Critical History of Archaeology in 19th and 20th Century Greece. London and New York: Routledge. pp. 130–147. ISBN 978-1-315-51344-7.
- Wace, Alan (1923). "Excavations at Mycenae § IX — The Tholos Tombs". The Annual of the British School at Athens. 25: 283–402. doi:10.1017/S0068245400010352. S2CID 183795426.
- Wace, Alan (1940). "The Treasury of Atreus". Antiquity. 14 (55): 233–249. doi:10.1017/S0003598X00015234. S2CID 162739311.
- Wace, Alan (1949). Mycenae: An Archaeological History and Guide. Princeton University Press. OCLC 1879252 – via Internet Archive.
- Wace, Alan (1956). "Mycenae 1939–1955, Part I: Preliminary Report on the Excavations of 1955". Annual of the British School at Athens. 51: 103–122. doi:10.1017/S0068245400018803. JSTOR 30096806. S2CID 159836724.
- Wace, Alan; Hood, M. Sinclair; Cook, John Manuel (1953). "The Epano Phournos Tholos Tomb". The Annual of the British School at Athens. Mycenae 1939–1952. 48: 19–29. doi:10.1017/S0068245400012466. JSTOR 30096964.
- Warren, Peter (2014). "Rosso Antico Marble and the Façade of the Treasury of Atreus". In Galanakis, Yannis; Wilkinson, Toby; Bennet, John (eds.). Athyrmata: Critical Essays on the Archaeology of the Eastern Mediterranean in Honour of E. Susan Sherratt. Oxford: Archaeopress. pp. 237–246. ISBN 978-1-78491-019-8.
