= Tomb of Clytemnestra =

Tholos tomb at Mycenae, Greece, dated to ca.1250 BCE

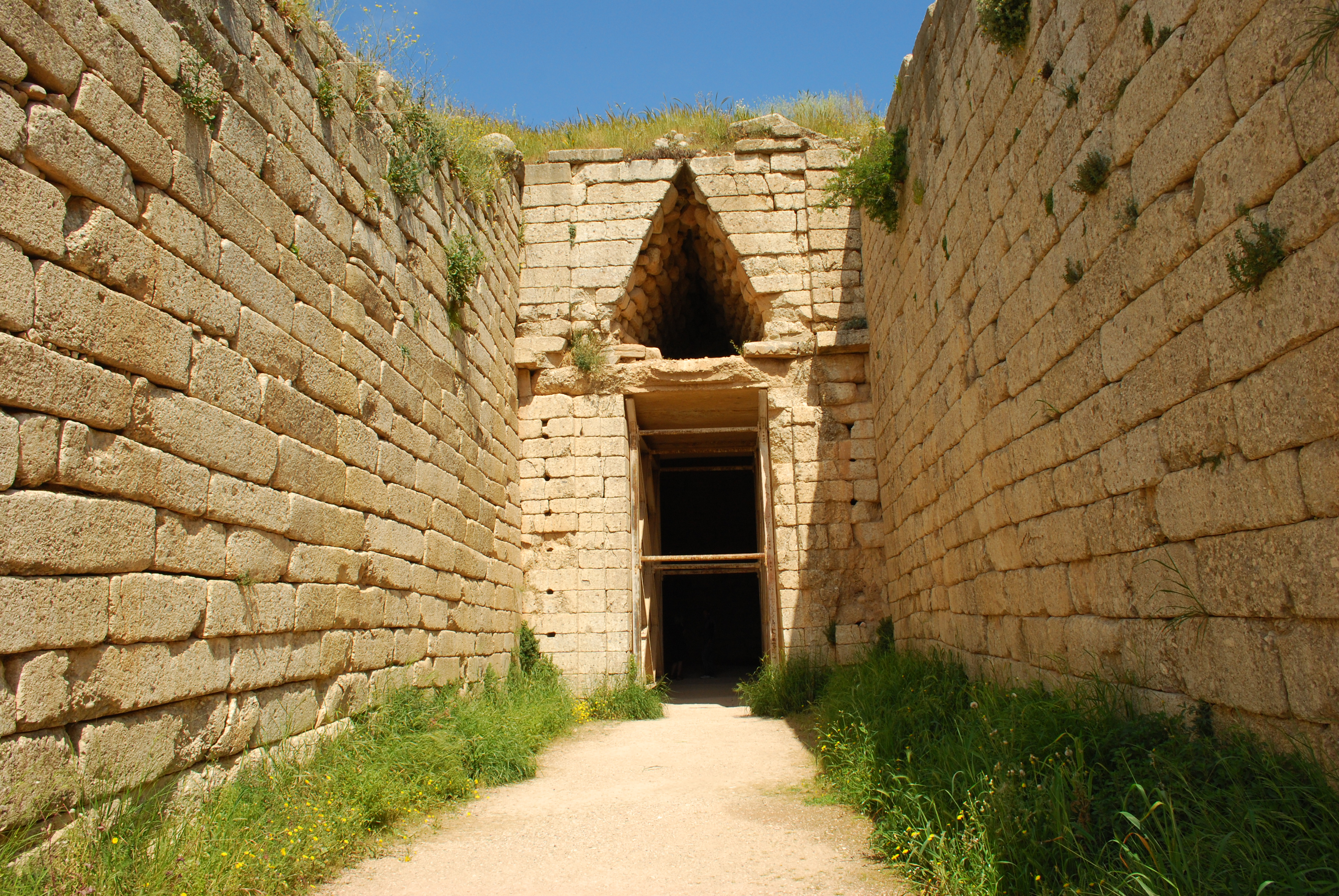
- Interactive map of Tomb of Clytemnestra
- Type: Royal tomb
- Cultures: Mycenaean Greek
- Location: Mycenae, Greece
- Region: Argolid

History
- Built: c. 1250 BC

The Tomb of Clytemnestra is a Mycenaean tholos type tomb built in c. 1250 BC. A number of architectural features such as the semi-column were largely adopted by later classical monuments of the first millennium BC, both in the Greek and Latin world. The Tomb of Clytemnestra with its imposing façade is together with the Treasury of Atreus the most monumental tomb of that type.

The tomb is named after Clytemnestra, the wife of king Agamemnon, mythical ruler of Mycenae and leader of the Greeks in the Trojan War. However, it has been also suggested by modern scholars that this might have been Agamemnon's tomb or even that the tomb was never occupied due to the destruction of Mycenae which occurred during that time.

== Chronology and classification ==
Tholos type tombs emerged in Mycenaean Greece in c. 1500-1450 BC as the resting places of the local royal families. They consisted of large circular burial chambers with high vaulted roofs and a straight entry passage (dromos) lined with stone. A total of nine royal tholos tombs were built in the immediate vicinity of the citadel of Mycenae during 15th-14th century BC. The most monumental of these with imposing façades are the Treasury of Atreus and the Tomb of Clytemnestra. The latter built in c. 1250 BC was the last tomb of this type in the region. It is also one of the representative examples of Mycenaean tholos tombs together with the Treasury of Atreus and the Tomb of the Genii.

== Architecture ==
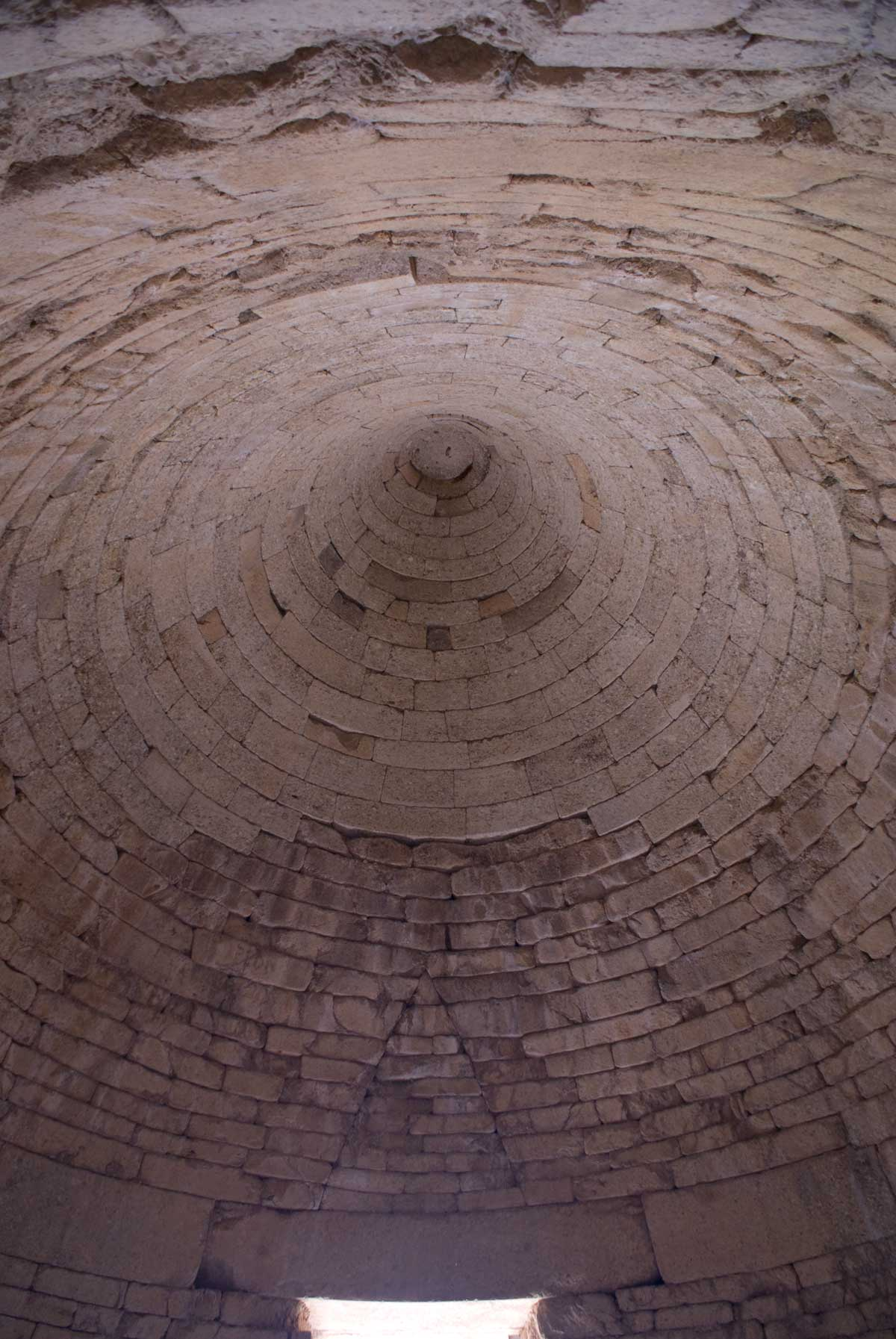
The roof of the burial chamber.

The entrance to the tomb consists of a dromos with walls of ashlar in conglomerate. Similarly, the stomion is built from the same element. The exterior façade of the stomion is decorated with half-columns made of gypsum which were carefully carved with ornate capitals and vertical fluting. A large relieving triangle overlaps the door lintel. It was originally decorated by a colored relief sculpture. Through the lintel block a small drain is cut in the rock, lined with low rubble walls and roofed with small slabs. Above them two stones are set to take the direct pressure off the covering slabs.

The surface of the tomb was covered with coat of white plaster. The burial chamber has a diameter of 13.4 metres (44 ft). Most blocks are sawn rather than hammer-dressed. The tomb chamber is constructed throughout of ashlar conglomerate masonry.

The Tomb of Clytemnestra shares several architectural features with that of Atreus such as the combination of conglomerate and limestone. However, the Tomb of Clytemnestra displays slightly more advanced technical features with rows of curved stones continuing around the structure at the same level of the lintel. This may indicate that the Tomb of Clytemnestra was a slightly later construction compared to the one of Atreus.

Architectural features of this specific tomb such as the semi-column were largely adopted by later classical monuments of the first millennium BC, both in the Greek and Latin world.

== Excavations ==
The tomb is named after Clytemnestra, wife of king Agamemnon of Mycenae who led the Greek expedition against Troy. Similarly, a number of Mycenaean tholos tombs were named after mythical persons of the local ruling dynasties, like Atreus and Aegisthus. The ancient Greek geographer Pausanias referred to the location of the tombs of Clytemnestra and Aegisthus a little further from the walls of Mycenae, as they were not judged fit to be buried within the walls due to the murder of king Agamemnon.

During the Ottoman rule of Greece the tomb was raided by Veli Pasha. Later 19th century archaeologist Heinrich Schliemann followed this passage of Pausanias and searched at the vicinity of Mycenae for their tombs. Schliemann was the first to excavate the site. Excavations in the 1960s led to the discovery of the surrounding walls of the tomb. In the dromos, a woman's grave was found in addition to accompanying artifacts: two mirrors, ornaments and beads. However, the inner burial chamber was found looted and empty.

Lord William Taylour suggested that the tomb may have been king Agamemnon's. It has been also claimed that the tomb had no occupant at all due to the destruction of Mycenae that occurred sometime during the mid-to-late 13th century BC.

== See also ==
- Early and simple domes
