= Palace Style =

Style of vase decoration from Minoan Crete

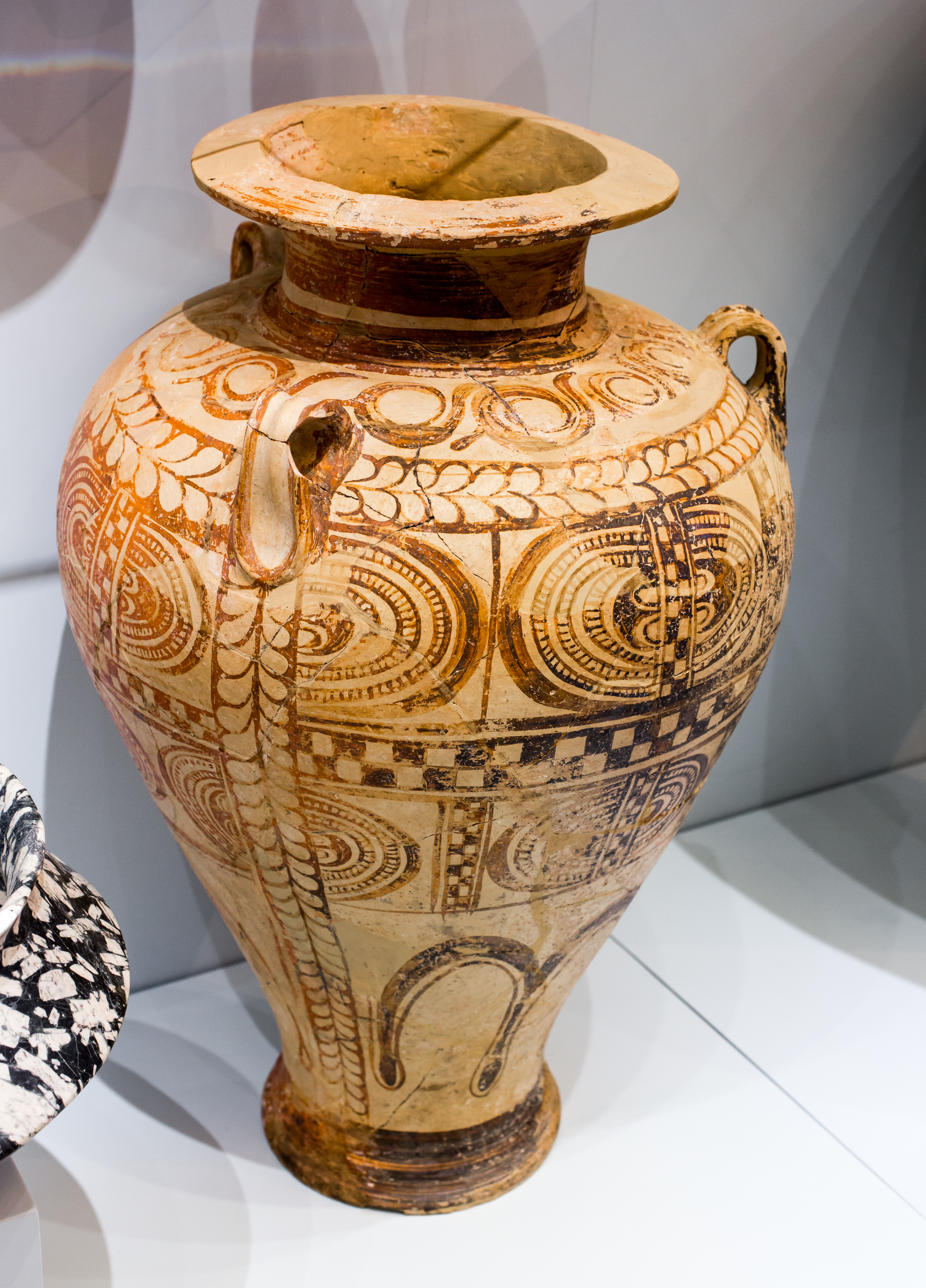
An amphora in the Palace Style from Knossos, at the Heraklion Archaeological Museum.

The Palace Style is an archaeological term, coined by Sir Arthur Evans, for a style of Minoan pottery. It flourished during the Late Minoan II (LMII) period, from approximately 1450 to 1400 BC. This "magnificent" style disappears after the final destruction of the Knossos palace around 1400 BC.

The style is characterized by a "grandiose and increasingly formal character" as well as "geometric severity" and "rhythmic, balanced" designs. It is often described as "grand, formal, tectonic, and rather cold" compared to the "fresher" Minoan styles that preceded it, such as the Floral Style and Marine Style. It represents a shift toward more schematic, symmetrical, and "stiff" designs, losing the "vibrancy" of earlier naturalistic art.

== Etymology ==
The term "Palace Style" was chosen because the pottery, primarily large, high-quality storage vessels, was found almost exclusively in the vicinity of the Palace of Knossos.

== Characteristics and evolution ==
The Palace Style is a monumental style that adapts earlier naturalistic motifs into more stylized designs. Motifs are often inspired by decorations found on the palace walls, and many designs reproduce details from metalwork models.

Common motifs include:

- Stylized plants, especially the papyrus (often seen with wave patterns), lilies, and reeds.
- Marine life, such as the octopus and dolphin.
- Architectural elements and sacred symbols, such as 8-shaped shields, helmets, rosettes, and elaborate double axes.
- Auxiliary linear and geometric patterns.

New ceramic shapes also appear, including large vessels like amphorae, pithoi, and prochoi. The style also saw the adoption of mainland shapes, such as the Ephyraean goblet, as well as the krater, the squat alabastron, and bowls with horizontal handles.

As the style evolved, floral stems became depicted "as thin as threads" and leaves were often replaced by rosettes. Around 1400 BC, it was succeeded by a final Minoan pottery phase in which the decorative themes "degenerate and lose their organic unity."

== Earlier "Palace Style" ==
Arthur Evans also identified an "Earlier 'Palace Style'" dating to the Middle Minoan II (M.M. II) period. This style was similarly defined by its "decorative motives to a great extent architectonic in their origin," with designs on pottery reflecting the decorative motifs of the palace's wall paintings. Evans saw an "anticipation" of the later L.M. II Palace Style in an M.M. III jar that combined natural plant forms with "purely conventional excrescences."

== Distribution and interpretation ==
=== Mycenaean association ===
The "spirit of this style is rather foreign to Minoan Crete" and is widely interpreted as evidence for the presence of Mycenaean Achaians at Knossos. This Achaean ruling class is believed to have introduced the style, as "Mycenaean taste dominates the Knossos palace" in this period. The Palace Style at Knossos is described as "indistinguishable from the contemporary style at Mycenae."

This interpretation is supported by several factors:

- The pottery's "formalism, monumentality and tectonic composition" is seen as an Achaian influence.
- The appearance of new, mainland-inspired vessel shapes, such as the Ephyraean goblet.
- The "splendid vases" are found in "Warrior Grave" type tombs near Knossos, such as at Katsambas (Herakleion) and Ayios Ioannis, which contain "new kinds of weapons" of mainland type (e.g., thrusting swords and helmets).
- The contemporary introduction of the Linear B script, an adaptation of Linear A used to write Mycenaean Greek.

=== The "Palace Style paradox" ===
While Evans named the style for the Palace of Knossos, more recent analysis has pointed to a "serious paradox." According to archaeologist Emily Townsend, the Palace Style pottery is "not actually found inside the palace at all, much less stratified upon its final floors."

Instead, the great jars are found in depots and buildings outside the palace's proper limits, appearing most densely to the west:

- In houses such as the "Little Palace" (which Vermeule suggests was "apparently the residence of a prominent Greek").
- In the "Warrior Grave" tombs along the harbor road.

While these jars were skillfully made in local Knossian workshops, they were "not the common pottery of the palace in its final days."

Arthur Evans proposed two explanations for this absence:

1. The palace court may have preferred to use more valuable metal vessels, while the "lesser townspeople" used these clay jars.
2. The jars, being "rather splendid," may have been "kept locked up in special west magazines when not being used."

== Sources ==
- Davaras, Costis (1976). Guide to Cretan Antiquities. Eptalofos S.A. ISBN 0-8155-5044-8.
- Evans, Arthur (1921). The Palace of Minos: A Comparative Account of the Successive Stages of the Early Cretan Civilization as Illustrated by the Discoveries at Knossos. Vol. 1: The Neolithic and Early and Middle Minoan Ages. Macmillan and Co.
- Evans, Arthur (1935). The Palace of Minos. A comparative Account of the successive Stages of the early Cretan Civilization as illustrated by the Discoveries at Knossos. Vol. 4, Part 1: Emergence of Outer Western Enceinte, with new Illustrations, Artistic and Religious, of the Middle Minoan Phase. London: MacMillan.
- Hiller, Stefan (1995). "Der SM II-Palaststil. Ausdruck politischer Ideologie?" [The SM II palace style. Expression of political ideology?]. In Laffineur, Robert; Niemeier, Wolf-Dietrich (eds.). Politeia. Society and state in the Aegan Bronze Age. Proceedings of the 5th International Aegean Conference. Aegaeum. Vol. 12. Liège: Université de Liège. pp. 561–576.
- Karantsavelou, Litsa K. (1968). "Ανακτορικός" [Palace]. Νέα Ελληνική Εγκυκλοπαίδεια «Χάρη Πάτση» (in Greek). Vol. 5. p. 390.
- Maroniti, D.N.; Polka, L.; Touloumi, K. "Αρχαϊκή Επική Ποίηση: Kεραμική και αγγειογραφία" [Archaic Epic Poetry: Pottery and Vases]. greek-language.gr (in Greek). Centre for the Greek Language.
- Niemeier, Wolf-Dietrich (1985). Die Palaststilkeramik von Knossos. Stil, Chronologie und historischer Kontext. Archäologische Forschungen (in German). Vol. 13. Berlin: Mann. ISBN 3-7861-1184-7.
- Sakellarakis, Jannis A. (1990). Heraklion. Das archäologische Museum. Ein Bildführer (in German). Athen: Ekdotike Athenon S.A. ISBN 960-213-038-5.
- Townsend, Emily (2024-05-31). Greece in the Bronze Age. University of Chicago Press. ISBN 978-0-226-85355-0.
- Vermeule, Emily (1963). "The Fall of the Knossos Palace". Archaeology. 16 (1): 67–75. JSTOR 41667232.
- Willetts, Ronald F. (1977). The civilization of ancient Crete. Berkeley, CA: University of California Press. ISBN 0-520-03406-6.
