= Poros stone =

Limestone widely used in ancient Greece

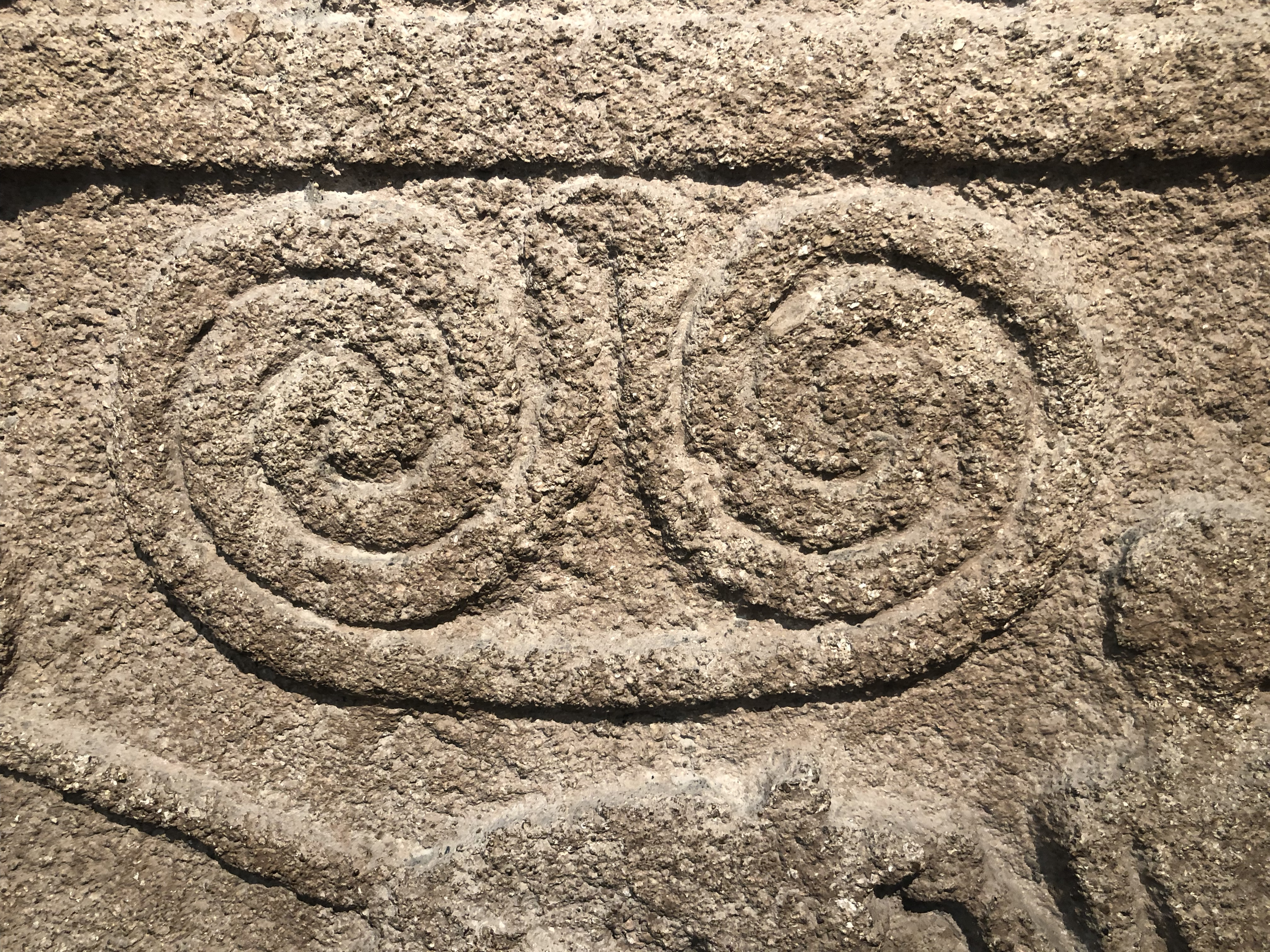
Funerary stele made of poros stone (Mycenae, 16th century B.C.)

Poros stone is a lightweight, soft, marly limestone that was widely used in construction and statues of Ancient Greece. There is no precise definition of the term, although its roots go to antiquity, when it was used to designate any porous building rock, regardless of its origin, mostly in contrast with marble. In the 20th century the archeologists continued to use the term in the similarly loose way: "poros [was] made to include almost all light-coloured stones" that were not definitely marble or hard limestone.

The poros stone is one of the chief formations of the Neogene (Miocene or Pliocene) in Greece and it occurs at many places in the Peloponnese, making poros a common construction stone there.

Even when hardened by exposure to the elements, poros is much more readily cut with a knife than ordinary limestone. The ease of working with poros is the reason for its extensive use as a building stone, especially for foundations and other architectonic parts that are not exposed to view.

== Ancient term ==
The Greek geographer Pausanias uses the term "poros" to describe the material of the Temple of Zeus at Olympia, which was built of local shell limestone, Theophrastus (and Pliny the Elder, who borrows the description) declares it to be a less dense variant of Parian marble. Herodotus also contrasts coarse poros with fine marble.

== Archeological term ==
Henry Stephens Washington (a geologist with a major interest in classical studies) declared in 1923:

[A] non-petrographic archaeologist [while in Greece] will not go far astray if he calls by the name of "poros" any [...] easily cut, finely granular, yellow, light cream or gray, dull-lustered and somewhat rough building stone, which effervesces with dilute hydrochloric acid or with acetic acid [...] and usually leaves a fine muddy residue

Washington describes the differences between poros and regular limestone as the former being very finely arenaceous or marly; most often of a pale cream color, also light yellow or light gray; somewhat granular but rather soft and friable and easily cut with a knife, especially when first exposed in the quarry (similar to the volcanic tuffs of Roman Campagna in this last quality, while having nothing in common otherwise).

Hadjidakis et al., while reviewing the ancient quarries, use the term in its ancient sense, to designate any low-density rock, regardless of its petrographical classification.

== Sources ==
- Rhodes, Robin F. (1987-10-01). "Rope Channels and Stone Quarrying in the Early Corinthia". American Journal of Archaeology. 91 (4). University of Chicago Press: 545–551. doi:10.2307/505289. ISSN 0002-9114. JSTOR 505289. S2CID 193100232.
- Washington, Henry S. (1923-10-01). "Excavations at Phlius in 1892". American Journal of Archaeology. 27 (4). University of Chicago Press: 438–446. doi:10.2307/497795. ISSN 0002-9114. JSTOR 497795. S2CID 192992684.
- Hadjidakis, P.; Matarangas, D.; Varti-Matarangas, M. (2003). Ancient quarries in Delos, Greece. Proceedings of the 7th International Conference of Association for the Study of Marble and Other Stones in Antiquity. pp. 273–278.
- Frazer, J.G. (1913). Pausanias's Description of Greece. Macmillan and Company, limited.
