= Stomion (archaeology) =

Mycenaean Greek doorway

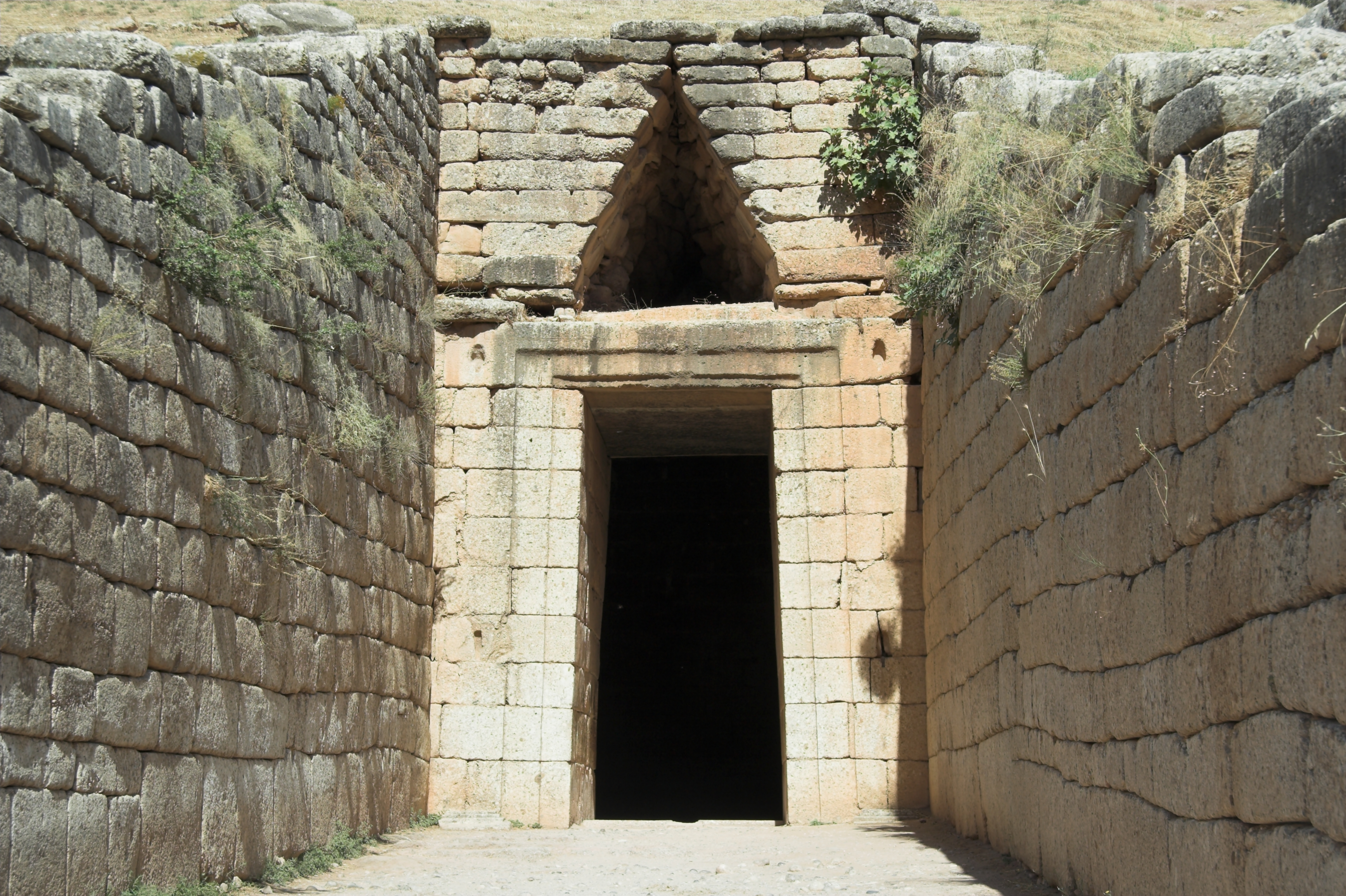
The stomion of the so-called "Treasury of Atreus"

A stomion was a deep doorway of post and lintel construction that formed the entrance of Mycenaean megalithic structures particularly on tholoi or beehive tombs. Contrasting with the cyclopean masonry that formed the basis of much of Mycenaean construction, stomioi were formed of large ashlars. The ashlars are typically topped with a large corbelled relieving triangle which in the case of the Lion Gate at Mycenae contains a bas-relief carving. The stomion of a tomb is fronted by a dromos, a narrow passageway dug into the side of a hill.
