= Richard MacGillivray Dawkins =

British archaeologist (1871–1955)

Richard MacGillivray Dawkins FBA
- Photographed at Sparta while director of the British School at Athens, 1908
- Born: 24 October 1871; Surbiton, Surrey, England
- Died: 4 May 1955 (aged 83); Oxford, England
- Relatives: Simon McGillivray (grandfather); Sir John Easthope (great-grandfather); John Andrew Doyle (first cousin, once removed)

Academic background
- Education: Marlborough College; King's College, London; Emmanuel College, Cambridge
- Military career
- Allegiance: United Kingdom
- Branch: Royal Naval Volunteer Reserve
- Service years: 1916–1919
- Rank: Temporary Lieutenant
- Wars: First World War

Richard MacGillivray Dawkins FBA (24 October 1871 – 4 May 1955) was a British archaeologist and a scholar of modern Greek dialectology and folklore. His parents, a Royal Navy officer and the heiress of the businessman Simon McGillivray, sent him to board from the age of nine, first at Totnes Grammar School and then at Marlborough College. His time at school was unhappy, and he was largely unsuccessful academically. After leaving Marlborough in 1890, he followed his father's wishes and enrolled to study electrical engineering at King's College, London. This proved no more enjoyable, and he spent his spare time teaching himself languages, both classical and modern. After two years, he dropped out of King's in 1892 to become an apprentice at a Chelmsford electrical company, where he worked until 1897.

In 1898, using money inherited from both parents, Dawkins took a place at Emmanuel College, Cambridge, to study classics. This time he was more successful; he graduated in 1902 with a double first, and was awarded a Craven Scholarship to study at the British School at Athens (BSA) for the following academic year. There, he took part in his first archaeological excavations, at Roussolakkos near Palaikastro on Crete, and conducted fieldwork studying Modern Greek dialects. He was elected as a fellow of Emmanuel in 1904, and appointed as director of the BSA in 1906. There, he directed four seasons of excavation at the Sanctuary of Artemis Orthia near Sparta, and further archaeological projects on Crete and other Greek islands.

During the First World War, Dawkins served in Crete as an interpreter and intelligence officer for the Royal Naval Volunteer Reserve, gathering information on German U-boats and the local population. In 1916, he published Modern Greek in Asia Minor, one of first academic studies of the Cappadocian Greek dialect and one of the last to be published before the ethnic cleansing of Greeks from the region in the early 1920s. In 1919, he was elected the first Bywater Professor of Byzantine and Modern Greek Language and Literature in the University of Oxford; he became a fellow of the university's Exeter College in 1922. He taught little, but continued to travel widely in the eastern Mediterranean to study Greek dialects. He published several articles and volumes on modern Greek folklore, started unpublished works on Byzantine history and modern Greek literature, and collected a large assemblage of modern Greek embroideries, which he bequeathed to the Victoria and Albert Museum.

Dawkins's excavations at the Sanctuary of Artemis Orthia were praised for their technical excellence and contribution to the history of Sparta, though delays in their publication meant that some of the methodology and conclusions were obsolete by the time they became public. He has been credited with making important contributions to the discovery of Minoan civilisation on Crete and to the study of Greek folklore and dialectology. He was made a Fellow of the British Academy and awarded the silver cross (the second-highest grade) of the Greek Order of the Redeemer.

== Early life and education ==
Richard MacGillivray Dawkins was born on 24 October 1871 in Surbiton in the English county of Surrey. He was the eldest child of Richard Dawkins, a Royal Navy officer, (Note: The elder Dawkins held the rank of captain in 1871; he would be promoted to rear admiral on his retirement in 1878.) and his wife Mary Louisa, the daughter of the businessman Simon McGillivray and a granddaughter of the politician and journalist Sir John Easthope. (Note: Halliday & Gill 2009; for Mary Louisa's father, Woolf (ed.) 1962, p. 8.) In 1878, Dawkins's father retired from the navy and settled in Stoke Gabriel in Devon. Dawkins was initially taught by his mother, whom he later described in his unpublished memoirs as "extremely competent and well read", and later by a governess.

From the age of nine, from 1881 to 1884, Dawkins was educated as a boarder at the nearby Totnes Grammar School. (Note: In an obituary, Romilly Jenkins described the school as having "much resembled that Crichton House depicted with grim fidelity in the pages of F. Anstey's Vice Versa.) He moved to Marlborough College, a public school in Wiltshire, in 1884. His entry in the Oxford Dictionary of National Biography describes him as "an awkward, ungainly, and short-sighted boy with a dislike for all forms of organised games which he retained throughout his life", and comments that his schooldays were undistinguished and, apart from his acquisition of a lifelong love of botany, unhappy. (Note: An obituary by Romilly Jenkins concurs, stating that "his career at Marlborough was neither prosperous nor happy", that he found few friends there, and developed the lifelong attitude that organised sport was "servitude in the guise of amusement".) He won school prizes in natural history and geography, respectively in 1888 and 1890, but achieved little in classical languages; he later said that he was often close to being required to repeat a year due to poor academic performance.

Leaving Marlborough in 1890, he went up to King's College, London; at his father's direction, he studied electrical engineering. Although academically successful, particularly in mathematics, he was bored by engineering; he began reading books on linguistics and teaching himself languages in his spare time. (Note: These began with Sanskrit, which he initially learned out of an interest in religion, and came to include Italian, German, Icelandic, Irish and Finnish, as well as reading classical works in Greek and Latin.) In July 1892, having completed only two years of his three-year course, he left King's to become an apprentice to Crompton's, an electrical engineering company in Chelmsford which made arc lamps. He continued his amateur linguistic studies during his period with the firm; after his apprenticeship, he became a designer, and remained in this post until 1897.

Following the deaths of both of his parents, (Note: His father died in March 1896, and his mother in January 1897.) Dawkins inherited enough money to take a place at Emmanuel College, Cambridge, in 1898. He chose to study classics on the advice of an acquaintance, who was a priest, and Emmanuel on the recommendation of a friend already studying at the university. His teachers there included Peter Giles, who taught philology, and James Adam, who taught ancient philosophy. He was also taught by Arthur Bernard Cook, known as a scholar of ancient religion, John Percival Postgate, who studied Latin poetry; and the Sanskrit scholar Edward Byles Cowell. His contemporaries and friends included Alan Wace, at Pembroke College, and Frederick William Hasluck at King's; he was also a contemporary of Percy Ure, studying at Gonville and Caius College. Although inexperienced in the conventional academic practice of classics, particularly in translating English into Latin and Greek, he had a good knowledge of both ancient languages and proved skilled in translating from them into English. He was awarded a scholarship in 1899, after his first year of study. He first visited Greece in a thirty-day visit in 1900, in which he saw several classical sites, and wrote up a report of the trip in the Emmanuel College magazine: his account included details of botany, and the observations of contemporary folk culture which would characterise his later academic work. Graduating in 1902 with a double first, he was awarded a Craven Scholarship, worth £50 (equivalent to £5,000 in 2025), to study at the British School at Athens (BSA) for the following academic year. (Note: Mackridge 1990, p. 201; Mackridge 2009, p. 49. For the amount, see Gill 2011, p. 90.)

== British School at Athens ==
Dawkins (viewer's left) at Roussolakkos in 1903, with Robert Carr Bosanquet (centre) and, perhaps, John Myres

During Dawkins's first period at the BSA, in 1902–1903, he took part in his first archaeological excavations in March–June 1903, at the Minoan site at Roussolakkos near Palaikastro on Crete, led by the BSA's director, Robert Carr Bosanquet. Although initially intent on participating in archaeological work in Greece, he came to concentrate on research into modern Greek dialectology. He spent time in the Dodecanese islands, particularly Karpathos, studying the local dialects; on Karpathos he sought to compare the local dialect with that of eastern Crete, which he had learned while excavating at Roussolakkos.

Dawkins was elected as a fellow of Emmanuel College, Cambridge, in 1904. He returned to the Roussolakkos excavation in 1904, 1905 and 1906, and was its director in 1904–1905. During the 1904 season he excavated a Neolithic dwelling and rock-shelter, and transcribed 953 mantinades – a form of folk poetry set to music – recited to him by local men. He made his first visit to the monastery of Mount Athos, in northern Greece, in 1905; he would return there in 1931, 1933 and 1935, and publish an account of his time as The Monks of Athens in 1936.

Following Bosanquet's resignation as the BSA's director in July 1905, Dawkins was shortlisted alongside Wace and Duncan Mackenzie, the school's assistant director, to replace him. In a meeting of 13 March, the managing committee described Dawkins as "a capable worker in widely varied directions", and as possessing a better writing style than either Wace or Mackenzie, but as perhaps "a better worker than an inspirer of work in others, and not likely to be strong on the social side". He was, however, appointed. (Note: In their final meeting, the committee also introduced and discounted the prospect of appointing Ronald Burrows, the Professor of Greek at University College, Cardiff.) The archaeological historian David Gill considers that a reference written for Dawkins by James Adam, his former teacher, was decisive: Adams praised his former student's teaching abilities and personal character alongside his quality as an archaeologist. Although Arthur Evans, an influential member of the committee, proposed appointing Dawkins on a temporary one-year contract, the committee decided to give him the post for three years, on an annual salary of £500 (equivalent to £53,000 in 2025). Since Mackenzie had indicated that he would not continue as assistant director if Dawkins were appointed, a replacement needed to be found: the committee gave the decision to Dawkins, who appointed his friend Hasluck, then serving as the school's librarian. In May–June 1906, Dawkins and Hasluck travelled by rail and road from İzmir on Anatolia's southern Aegean coast of to Nicaea in its northwest, carrying out linguistic fieldwork.

=== Directorship ===
The Church of the Episkopi on the Greek island of Sikinos, photographed by Dawkins in 1907. In Dawkins's time, the church was thought to be built around an ancient temple of Apollo; later investigation showed it to be a monumental Roman tomb.

Dawkins's sister Annie moved to Athens with him, and handled his domestic affairs. During his first summer as director, Dawkins travelled throughout the southern Sporades islands with Wace, recording inscriptions, collecting embroidered artwork, and pursuing Dawkins's interest in modern Greek dialects. (Note: Cheryl Simpson notes that Wace justified their focus on the Greek islands by his belief that the Greek mainland had been resettled throughout history, such that it was "Greek by culture and language rather than by race".) Wace put on an exhibition of Greek embroideries at Cambridge University's Fitzwilliam Museum in 1906, whose contents consisted almost entirely of works from his and Dawkins's collections. Dawkins and Wace made another collecting excursion, this time in the Cyclades, in 1907. (Note: Dawkins lent several objects collected in the Cyclades to the Fitzwilliam; after he moved from Cambridge to Oxford in 1919, these were transferred to that university's Ashmolean Museum.) Collecting embroideries, often in large numbers, remained a feature of Dawkins's life until 1914; he and Wace were unusual among contemporary collectors in the field in that they kept detailed notes and catalogues of their acquisitions.

From 1904, Bosanquet had established a new campaign of excavation in the southern Greek region of Laconia, around the ancient city of Sparta, as the BSA's main archaeological project. After various minor excavations in 1904 and 1905, a major project was initiated in 1906, with Dawkins as assistant director to Bosanquet. The project chiefly aimed to establish the topography of the ancient city, and began on the acropolis, progressing into excavations of two Roman-period buildings, a stoa and the theatre. The excavations revealed the site of the Sanctuary of Athene Chalkioikos, discovered by Guy Dickins in April 1907. From 1906 to 1910, Dawkins directed four excavation seasons at the Sanctuary of Artemis Orthia in the eastern part of the city. The excavation uncovered thousands of objects, dating between the Archaic period (c. 750 – c. 480 BCE) and the third century CE. In 1909, the project excavated at the Menelaion, an eighth-century BCE shrine to the mythical hero Menelaus built over the remains of a Bronze Age site, and discovered some Bronze Age buildings. Dawkins partly excavated one of these in 1910.

Away from Laconia, Dawkins visited Cyprus in 1908, as part of a reporting mission for the BSA on the state of the island's antiquities and the archaeological museum at Nicosia; Maurice S. Thompson, whom he asked to accompany him, later recalled that they stopped over in Egypt en route, and that Dawkins spent most of his time there buying Greek embroideries in the Cairo markets. In August–September 1908, he visited Venice with the writer Frederick Rolfe, known as "Baron Corvo", and developed an interest in Venetian architecture. Following the conclusion of the Sparta excavations in 1910, he conducted a season of re-excavation at the Bronze Age site of Phylakopi on the island of Melos in March–May 1911. Phylakopi had initially been excavated by the BSA in 1896–1899, but Dawkins hoped to re-evaluate the site in the light of more recent discoveries at other prehistoric sites, including those of Evans at Knossos on Crete, of Christos Tsountas, Wace and Maurice Thompson in northern Greece, and of Wilhelm Dörpfeld at Tiryns in the Argolid. He had hoped to carry out further excavations in Turkey, at Datça on the Aegean coast of Anatolia and of the beehive tomb at Kirk Kilisse in Thrace, but the outbreak of the Italo-Turkish War in 1911 and the First Balkan War in 1912 prevented it. In December 1912, he travelled to Naxos with the linguist Cecil A. Scutt, studying the local dialect.

Dawkins (seated, centre) at the Artemis Orthia excavations in 1908. Alan Wace is seated furthest to the viewer's left, Thompson furthest to the viewer's right. Guy Dickins is standing in the centre.

In November 1909, Dawkins joined the directors of other foreign archaeological institutes in writing a letter in support of Panagiotis Kavvadias, the Ephor General of Antiquities in charge of the Greek Archaeological Service, whose resignation had been demanded by the Military League, a faction of military officers with a dominant position in Greek politics. (Note: The letter was not successful: Kavvadias was forced out of his position, and to leave Greece, by the end of 1909.) From 1909–1911 he studied the Greek dialects of Asia Minor, travelling to the region in each year (accompanied in 1911 by William Reginald Halliday) and collecting over one hundred texts, most of which he published and translated in his 1916 monograph Modern Greek in Asia Minor. In 1913, he failed to secure permission for the BSA to excavate at Lyktos on Crete, an autonomous possession of the Ottoman Empire shortly to be united with Greece, in collaboration with the Italian School of Archaeology at Athens; the project had been encouraged by Evans, and Stefanos Dragoumis, the Governor-General of Crete and himself an amateur archaeologist, rejected the possibility, a decision which the archaeological historian Antonis Kotsonas describes as "a strong reaction to European colonialism, and thus ... the end of an era for the archaeology of Crete". In the same year, he led excavations at Kamares Cave, a Minoan cult site on Mount Ida on Crete.

In 1911, Dawkins's sister Annie became unwell, and moved back to Britain from Athens. Dawkins took a year's leave of absence from October, which Mackridge considers was meant both to allow him to assist her in returning home and to conduct his own research and writing. Hasluck was appointed as temporary director, on a salary of £500 (equivalent to £51,000 in 2025). On his return in 1912, Dawkins lived with Hasluck and his wife, Margaret, in the director's house. His appointment as director was renewed for an additional year in July 1913, though by October of that year he had made the managing committee aware that he would not serve past October 1914. By November 1913, the committee were considering the question of his successor; Wace had accepted the committee's offer of the post by 23 December. Dawkins conducted his last excavations, on Crete at Plati on the Lasithi Plateau, in 1914, and formally resigned in the summer of that year. Wace took office in the autumn. Dawkins remained a member of the school's managing committee, and later served as one of its vice-presidents.

== First World War ==
French artillery in Athens, with the Acropolis in the background, following the events of the Noemvriana, 1917

In the late summer of 1914, while still in post as director of the BSA, Dawkins travelled to Trebizond, a historically Greek-speaking city on the Turkish Black Sea coast: he was there in August when the First World War broke out. After hastily returning to Britain, he began working with Hasluck in 1915 as a cryptographer at the British Legation in Athens in the "Bureau of Information", in fact an intelligence organisation. During this period he spent time in the archives of the Historical Dictionary of the Greek Language, researching Greek dialects, and was also reported as being in Malta in November 1915. After six months in this position, his fellow classical archaeologist John Myres introduced Dawkins to Douglas Dent, the senior British naval intelligence officer on the Aegean island of Astypalaia. Dawkins was initially enrolled as a civilian, then commissioned in 1916 as a temporary lieutenant in the Royal Naval Volunteer Reserve (RNVR). (Note: Jenkins 1955, pp. 382–383; J. M. 1956, p. 7. Gill gives the date of his commission as 1917.) Against naval regulations, Dawkins refused to shave his moustache, or to grow a beard, as was permitted.

Dawkins was based on HMS Pelorus, in service at Souda Bay as a depot ship, but was tasked to travel widely around Crete acting as an interpreter. His work involved crossing Crete by foot or mule, and at least 61 voyages on a Greek fishing trawler that was being used to collect intelligence for the British. His main role was to report on German U-boats, which operated from Crete; to monitor their movements, identify potential fuelling stations, and to question Cretan villagers as to their knowledge of them. (Note: Gill 2011, pp. 249–250. See also Stephenson, Gilbert (18 May 1955). "Prof. R. M. Dawkins". The Times. p. 13.) His biographer Peter Mackridge suggests that Dawkins was probably also tasked with reporting on enemy spies, monitoring the local newspapers, and gathering information on local people supplying food and fuel to the boats. Gilbert Stephenson, who was berthed in the trawler alongside Dawkins and later praised his interpreting work, recalled that the ship's company called him "Old Sideways", as he habitually walked with his head, in Stephenson's words, "hard-a-port".

Dawkins served alongside John Myres, another classical archaeologist, under the command of Compton Mackenzie, then a naval intelligence officer. Another comrade was John Cuthbert Lawson, also an alumnus of the BSA and a scholar of modern Greek folkore. From late November 1916 to early March 1917, Dawkins was sent to the island of Syros – to which the British intelligence bureau in Greece had recently transferred from Athens, following the violent occupation of the latter, known as the Noemvriana, by Anglo-French troops – to command a unit tasked with censoring telegrams. He was considered in 1918 for the inaugural Koraes Professorship in Byzantine and modern Greek studies at the University of London, but withdrew from consideration for the post.

== Later career ==
Exeter College, Oxford, photographed in 2025

Dawkins returned to England from Crete in April 1919, the month in which he was demobilised from the RNVR. On 11 December of the same year, he was elected the first Bywater Professor of Byzantine and Modern Greek Language and Literature in the University of Oxford. In 1922, he became a fellow of the university's Exeter College. He supervised the doctorate (D.Phil) of Georgina Buckler, on the Byzantine historian Anna Komnene, completed in 1927; she is the only postgraduate student known to have been supervised by a professor of post-classical Greek at either Oxford or London before 1950. (Note: Dawkins turned away another potential graduate student, Philip Whitting, who obtained his undergraduate degree in 1925 and subsequently published widely on Byzantine history and numismatics as a history teacher at St Paul's School in London.) In his unpublished autobiography, written in 1950, he stated that he had taught a total of three undergraduate students in his career, all of whom achieved a second in their degree. The terms of the Bywater professorship allowed Dawkins a term's travel away from Oxford each year, and he used this allowance primarily to travel the Greek-speaking parts of Asia Minor and the eastern Aegean islands. In 1945, he delivered the Taylorian Lecture on the medieval Cypriot chronicler Leontios Machairas, whose work Dawkins had edited and translated in 1932. In 1950, he published Forty-Five Stories from the Dodecanese, based on a manuscript collection bequeathed by W. H. D. Rouse, headmaster of The Perse School in Cambridge, to Cambridge University, itself collected by the Greek antiquary Jacob Zarraftis early in the twentieth century.

Dawkins retired from Oxford in 1939, though he was given an honorary fellowship by which he continued to reside in his college rooms and continued his academic work. Dimitrios Kaklamanos, a former Greek minister to the United Kingdom, expressed his pleasure to John Mavrogordato – who came to succeed Dawkins as Bywater professor – on hearing of his retirement, on the grounds that Dawkins had reduced the chair to a "mere fiction" by publishing almost entirely on what Kaklamanos described as dead dialects of no current interest. Early in the Second World War, Dawkins worked for Chatham House, which had relocated to Balliol College, Oxford, and taken the role of reporting to the British government on the content of foreign newspapers. Mavrogordato recalled that Dawkins entered his room in tears when learning, in April 1941, of the German invasion of Greece.

Between 1928 and 1930, Dawkins served as president of the Folklore Society, and in his later life published three considerable collections of Greek folk tales. In his study of folklore, he argued against the "primitive-survival hypothesis", that folktales represented ancient and unchanged relics of a "primitive" state of a culture's existence, instead arguing that traditional stories are continually adapted to the times in which they are retold, and indeed must maintain an appeal in each generation or be lost. In 1948 he broke his thigh in a fall at a friend's house: thereafter his mobility was severely impaired, and he walked with two sticks and a steel support strapped to his injured leg. He bequeathed his collection of Greek embroideries to the Victoria and Albert Museum (V&A) in London in 1950. This bequest, which consisted of around 750 embroideries, of which approximately 600 were Greek, was twice the size of the V&A's entire previous collections of its kind. In 1952, he published a biography of the writer Norman Douglas.

Dawkins's unpublished works included an unfinished book on the history of Crete in the years before its incorporation into Greece in 1913, which he worked on in 1918–1919. Around 1930, he composed a draft of a book on the Byzantine Varangian Guard, a medieval unit of northern Europeans serving in Constantinople; he expanded the draft in 1944, but never published it. He also wrote an unpublished paper in 1939 on the modern Greek poet Constantine P. Cavafy, which included his translations of some of Cavafy's works, (Note: The curator John Forsdyke, who knew Cavafy, stated that Cavafy in turn expressed his admiration for Dawkins's Modern Greek in Asia Minor.) and two draft versions of an autobiography, one each in 1938 and 1950. He died suddenly after collapsing in the street in Parks Road, Oxford, on 4 May 1955.

== Honours, assessment and legacy ==
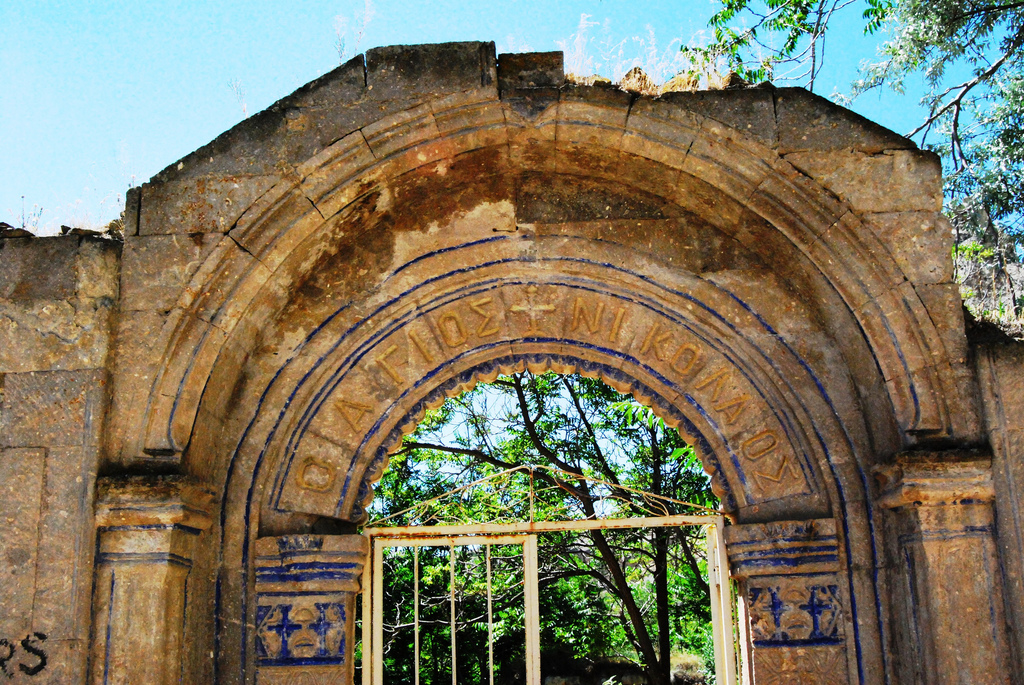
A Greek inscription on an archway in Mustafapaşa, in the Cappadocia region of Turkey, referencing Saint Nicholas

Dawkins was awarded honorary doctorates by the universities of Oxford, Athens and Thessaloniki. From 1933 until 1935 he was president of the Society for the Promotion of Hellenic Studies, a learned society based in London. He was elected a Fellow of the British Academy in 1933. He was also awarded the Silver Cross (the second-highest level) of the Order of the Redeemer, Greece's national order of merit.

Romilly Jenkins, in an obituary of Dawkins, described his excavations at the Sanctuary of Artemis Orthia as "for those times a masterpiece of technical skill ... [which] revolutionised all previous conceptions of Sparta's place in the artistic history of Greece". An obituary in The Times concurred that it "may fairly be said to have revolutionised the technique of digging in Greece". Although the excavation concluded in 1910, its publication was not yet complete upon the outbreak of the First World War in 1914, which further delayed the work: when the results were eventually published in 1929, developments in chronology had rendered some of the excavator's conclusions about the site's development obsolete, while the standard of photographs and drawings in the work was considered, in Jenkins's words, "old-fashioned and amateurish". The project was, however, generally praised for the careful and precise use of stratigraphy (the observation of different layers of material) to guide the excavation, which was a relatively new practice in the early twentieth century. A contemporary review of the excavation publication by Emil Kunze praised the project as "in methodological terms, a turning-point in archaeological fieldwork in Greece", while criticising the book on several grounds, including the authors' proposed chronology for the site, their choice of finds to catalogue and illustrate, and Dawkins's decisions as to how to organise the material.

Mackridge calls Dawkins "a somewhat reluctant archaeologist", but comments that his work was nonetheless important for the study of Minoan Crete and of archaic Sparta; James Whitley credits him, along with Arthur Evans and other contemporaries, as one of the discoverers of Minoan civilisation; (Note: In Calligas and Whitley (eds.) 2005, p. 109, cited in Mackridge 2009, p. 51.) Alan Peatfield calls his excavation at Kamares Cave a key moment in the history of Minoan archaeology. The classicist Robin Cormack has described Dawkins as a "maverick scholar" with particular importance for the more recent development of the history of mentalities, in which primacy is given to the ways in which people in the past understood and interacted with the world. Gill calls him one of the most gifted linguists to study at the BSA in the early twentieth century. He was one of the first scholars to carry out substantial research into the modern Greek dialects spoken in Asia Minor, which largely lacked a written tradition. The folklorist Robert A. Georges called him "one of the giants of the century in the field of folktale scholarship", and judged that his collection and translation of modern Greek folktales constituted "a most valuable service for the field of comparative folkloristics". Chrysoula Chatzitaki-Kapsomenou, in 2002, wrote that Dawkins's work on Greek folktales was as yet unsurpassed, and call it "a high point in Greek folklore studies". (Note: Chatzitaki-Kapsomenou 2002, quoted in Mackridge 2009, p. 57.)

Georges also credits him with a major theoretical contribution in arguing that folktales undergo an evolutionary process in the course of oral transmission; Dawkins considered the most advanced stage, which he called the "oral novel", to be found in the Dodecanese, and to be characterised by "a ... meaning, which we may call allegorical or symbolic, of values as a general myth bearing some relation to human nature and experience". (Note: Georges 1965, pp. 209–210, quoting Dawkins 1951, p. 418.) Mackridge considers his most important work to be his study of Cappadocian Greek, published in 1916 as Modern Greek in Asia Minor, which was made less than a decade before the ethnic cleansing of Greek speakers from the region removed the opportunity from scholars to study the dialect in its original homeland. The Greek linguist N. P. Andriotis, who praised the accuracy of Dawkins's transcriptions of Cappadocian, called it "the first and sadly the last study of the Cappadocian dialect", and credited Dawkins with rendering scientific and systematic the previously "chaotic [and] uncoordinated" study of eastern Greek dialects. (Note: Quoted by Mackridge 1990, p. 209.)

== Personal life ==
Edward Lear's drawing of the plain of Apokoronas, Crete, made in May 1864

Dawkins had three younger sisters, Annie, Mary and Edith, and a younger brother, John M. Dawkins. (Note: Mackridge, Peter. "The Crete of R. M. Dawkins". Faculty of Modern and Medieval Languages, University of Oxford.. For John Dawkins's middle initial, see Olsen 2010, p. 105, n. 1.) John, born around 1888, was educated in his early teens at a naval academy in Kent, and went on to teach Arabic at Oxford University. In 1907, Dawkins inherited the Plas Dulas estate in Llanddulas, near Conwy in North Wales, on the death of John Doyle, his mother's cousin and a historian at All Souls College, Oxford. (Note: He also inherited the estate of Penderren, near Crickhowell in South Wales.) There, he experimented with plant importation and cultivation. He also displayed archaeological antiquities within the garden. Visitors included Noël Coward and Evelyn Waugh. The writer and philhellene Patrick Leigh Fermor, who met Dawkins in 1951, described him as "the most knowledgeable and charming of neo-Hellenists, whose rooms at Oxford ... were an Aladdin's cave of books of Greek folklore, language, customs and fairy-tales". (Note: Leigh Fermor 1958, p. 108, quoted in Mackridge, Peter. "The Crete of R. M. Dawkins". Faculty of Modern and Medieval Languages, University of Oxford.) From 1864, he collected at least 42 drawings by the artist Edward Lear, at least 22 of which were of Crete. When auctioned after Dawkins's death, at Sotheby's in London in November 1955, the collection was one of the largest assemblages of Lear's Cretan drawings outside the Gennadius Library in Athens; some pieces were bought by the historian Steven Runciman and entered the National Gallery of Scotland after Runciman's death.

Dawkins was gay, and largely reticent about his personal feelings. After his death, his brother John removed from his archive documents he considered compromising; no copy of Dawkins's many letters remained. Patrick Coghill, a scholar, soldier and aristocrat in Dawkins's acquaintance, signed off one letter (preserved by chance in one of Dawkins's books) by calling him a "Roustika Poustika" – a variation on the name of the Cretan village Roustika and the modern Greek word poustis, meaning "homosexual".

External images
- Portraits of Dawkins
- By Walter Stoneman, 1933
- By John David Roberts, 1939–1940
- By Osbert Lancaster, published in 1967

Peter Mackridge, in a biography of Dawkins, describes him as "undoubtedly a renowned misogynist" and the subject of rumours of pederasty. An account of his teaching by the cartoonist Osbert Lancaster stated that female students rarely signed up for his course in modern Greek, and that, if any did, he would deliver a first lecture "of such shattering indecency that the unfortunate young woman immediately decided to take up Icelandic." (Note: Lancaster 1967, pp. 77–78, quoted in Mackridge 1990, p. 201.) Mackridge elsewhere describes him as "deeply conservative", with a hatred of innovation, and personally known for his lively and humorous conversation – though he also judges that these latter qualities were conspicuously absent from Dawkins's writing. He credits Dawkins's scholarly interest in the Byzantine Empire to "an element of Romantic medievalism", and compares him with the classical Greek historian Herodotus in that, unlike Herodotus's contemporary Thucydides, Dawkins was more interested in collecting and retelling stories about the past than in assessing their veracity.

== Works ==
=== As sole author or editor ===
==== Books ====
- Dawkins, Richard M. (1916). Modern Greek in Asia Minor. Cambridge University Press. OCLC 491635331 – via Internet Archive.
- Dawkins, Richard M., ed. (1929). The Sanctuary of Artemis Orthia at Sparta. London: The Society for the Promotion of Hellenic Studies. OCLC 879090388.
- Machairas, Leontios (1932). Dawkins, Richard M. (ed.). Recital Concerning the Sweet Land of Cyprus, Entitled "Chronicle". Translated by Dawkins, Richard M. 2 vols. Oxford University Press. OCLC 5053768.
- Dawkins, Richard M. (1933). Norman Douglas. Florence: Tipografia Giuntina. OCLC 3674937.
- — (1936). The Monks of Athos. London: G. Allen & Unwin. OCLC 1012766.
- — (1950). Forty-Five Stories from the Dodecanese. London and New York: Cambridge University Press. OL 62599376M.
- — (1953). Modern Greek Folktales. Oxford University Press. OCLC 1150826202 – via Internet Archive.
- — (1955). More Greek Folktales. Oxford University Press. OCLC 1150826202 – via Internet Archive.

==== Articles, chapters and lectures ====
- Dawkins, Richard M. (1902–1903). "Notes from Karpathos". The Annual of the British School at Athens. 9: 176–210. JSTOR 30096270.
- — (1903–1904). "Notes from Karpathos". The Annual of the British School at Athens. 10: 83–102. JSTOR 30096288.
- — (1904–1905). "A Visit to Skyros". The Annual of the British School at Athens. 11: 72–80. JSTOR 30096315.
- — (1905–1906). "Excavations at Palaikastro V". The Annual of the British School at Athens. 12: 1–8. JSTOR 30096340.
- — (1906). "Modern Greek in Asia Minor". The Journal of Hellenic Studies. 26: 102–132, 267–291. JSTOR 624306.
- — (1910). "The Modern Carnival in Thrace and the Cult of Dionysus". The Journal of Hellenic Studies. 26: 191–206. JSTOR 624371.
- — (1911–1912). "The Apollo Temple on Sikinos". The Annual of the British School at Athens. 18: 30–36. JSTOR 30097065.
- — (1912–1913). "Cruciform Fonts in the Aegean Area". The Annual of the British School at Athens. 19: 123–132. JSTOR 30096925.
- — (1923). "The Twelve Months: A Folktale from Pontos". Laographia. 7: 285–291.
- — (1924). "Ancient Statues in Mediaeval Constantinople". Folklore. 35 (3): 209–248. JSTOR 1255671.
- — (1925–1930). "The Vocabulary of the Mediaeval Cypriot Chronicle of Leontios Makhairas". Transactions of the Philological Society: 300–330.
- — (1926). "The Greek Dialect of Cargese and Its Disappearance". Byzantinisch-Neugriechische Jahrbücher. 5: 371–379.
- — (1929). "Presidential Address: Folklore and Literature". Folklore. 40 (1): 14–36. JSTOR 1255707.
- — (1930). "Artemis Orthia: Some Additions and a Correction". The Journal of Hellenic Studies. 50 (2): 298–299. doi:10.1017/S0075426900071342. JSTOR 626818. S2CID 163268019.
- — (1930). "The Recent Study of Folklore in Greece". Jubilee Congress of the Folk-Lore Society, Sept. 19 – Sept. 25, 1928 : Papers and Transactions. London: W. Glaisher. pp. 121–137. OCLC 946763006.
- — (1931). "Folk Tales from Sourmena and the Valley of Ophis". Αρχείον Πόντου. 3: 79–122}.
- — (1931). "Notes on the Study of the Modern Greek of Pontos". Byzantion. 6 (1): 389–400. JSTOR 44167824.
- — (1933). "The Crypto-Christians of Turkey". Byzantion. 8 (1): 247–275. JSTOR 44167986.
- — (1934). "Some Modern Greek Songs from Cappadocia". Byzantion. 38 (1): 112–122. JSTOR 498937.
- — (1935). "The Visit of King Sigurd the Pilgrim to Constantinople". In Charitakis, Georgios (ed.). Εις μνήμην Σπυρίδωνος Λάμπρου [In Memory of Spyridon Lampros]. Athens: Hestia. pp. 55–62. OCLC 35705473.
- — (1936). "Greeks and Northmen". Homenatge a Antoni Rubió i Lluch : miscellània d'estudis literaris, històrics i linguistics [Tribute to Antoni Rubió i Lluch: Miscellany of Literary, Historical and Linguistic Studies]. Vol. 1. Barcelona. pp. 267–270. OCLC 491983706.
- — (1936). "Greeks and Northmen". In Buxton, L. H. Dudley (ed.). Custom is King: Essays Presented to R. R. Marett on His Seventieth Birthday, June 13, 1936. Hutchinson's Scientific and Technical Publications. pp. 35–47. OCLC 2545800.
- — (1936–1937). "The Process of Tradition in Greece". The Annual of the British School at Athens. 37: 48–55. JSTOR 30096660.
- — (1939). "Graeco-Barbara". Transactions of the Philological Society. 38 (1): 1–30. doi:10.1111/j.1467-968X.1939.tb00199.
- — (1940). "The Dialects of Modern Greek". Transactions of the Philological Society: 1–38. doi:10.1111/j.1467-968X.1940.tb01219.x.
- — (1942). "Folklore in Stories from the Dodecanese". Folklore. 53 (1): 5–26. JSTOR 1257708.
- — (1942). "Modern Greek Oral Versions of Apollonius of Tyre". Modern Language Review. 37: 169–184.
- — (1942–1943). "The Art of Story-Telling in the Dodecanese". Byzantion. 16 (2): 357–380. JSTOR 44168564.
- — (1944). "A Modern Greek Folktale and Comments". Folklore. 55 (4): 150–161. JSTOR 1257792.
- — (1945). The Nature of the Cypriot Chronicle of Leontios Makhairas. The Taylorian Lecture. Oxford University Press. OCLC 2573792.
- — (1946). "A Byzantine Carol in Honour of St Basil". The Journal of Hellenic Studies. 66: 43–47. JSTOR 626537.
- — (1948). "Some Remarks on Greek Folktales". Folklore. 59 (2): 49–68. JSTOR 1256983.
- — (1948). "The Folk Tale, by Stith Thompson". Folklore. 59 (3): 136–140. JSTOR 1257285.
- — (1949). "The Story of Griselda". Folklore. 60 (4): 363–374. JSTOR 1256964.
- — (1951). "The Meaning of Folktales". Folklore. 62 (4): 417–429. JSTOR 1257125.
- — (1951). "Recently Published Collections of Modern Folktales". The Annual of the British School at Athens. 46: Papers Presented to Professor Alan Wace to Commemorate Fifty Years of Work in Archaeology: 53–60. JSTOR 30096771.
- — (1952). "The Silent Princess". Folklore. 63 (3): 129–142. JSTOR 1256931.
- — (1953). "Notes on Life in the Monasteries of Mount Athos". The Harvard Theological Review. 46 (4): 217–231. JSTOR 1508386.
- — (1953). "The Two Bets: A Reconstructed Greek Folktale". Laographia. 15: 147–150.

=== As co-author ===
- Bosanquet, Robert Carr; Dawkins, Richard M.; Tod, Marcus Niebhur; Duckworth, Wynfrid Lawrence Henry; Myres, John L. (1902–1903). "Excavations at Palaikastro II". The Annual of the British School at Athens. 9: 274–387. JSTOR 30096273.
- Dawkins, Richard M.; Currelly, Charles T. (1903–1904). "Excavations at Palaikastro III". The Annual of the British School at Athens. 10: 192–231. JSTOR 30096298.
- Dawkins, Richard M.; Hawes, Charles H.; Bosanquet, Robert Carr (1904–1905). "Excavations at Palaikastro IV". The Annual of the British School at Athens. 11: 258–308. JSTOR 30096328.
- Bosanquet, Robert Carr; Wace, Alan J. B.; Dickins, Guy; Dawkins, Richard M.; Tillyard, H. J. W.; Traquair, Ramsay (1905–1906). "Laconia: II: Excavations at Sparta, 1906". The Annual of the British School at Athens. 12: 277–479. JSTOR 30096357.
- Dawkins, Richard M.; Wace, Alan J. B. (1905–1906). "Notes from the Sporades, Astypalaea, Telos, Nisyros, Leros". The Annual of the British School at Athens. 12: 151–174. JSTOR 30096350.
- Dawkins, Richard M.; Wace, Alan J. B.; Droop, John Percival; Dickens, Guy; Tilyard, H. J. W.; Woodward, A. M.; Tod, Marcus Niebuhr (1906–1907). "Laconia: I: Excavations at Sparta, 1907". The Annual of the British School at Athens. 13: 1–218. JSTOR 30096368.
- Dawkins, Richard M.; Droop, John Percival; Farrell, Jerome; Woodward, Arthur M.; Dickens, Guy; Wace, Alan J. B. (1907–1908). "Laconia: I: Excavations at Sparta, 1908". The Annual of the British School at Athens. 14: 1–160. JSTOR 30096391.
- Dawkins, Richard M.; Droop, John Percival; Woodward, Arthur M.; Giles, Peter; Wace, Alan J. B.; Thompson, Maurice Scott (1908–1909). "Laconia: I: Excavations at Sparta, 1909". The Annual of the British School at Athens. 15: 1–157. JSTOR 30096408.
- Dawkins, Richard M.; Woodward, Arthur M. (1908–1909). "Laconia: I: Excavations at Sparta, 1910". The Annual of the British School at Athens. 16: 1–61. JSTOR 30096432.
- Dawkins, Richard M.; Droop, John Percival (1910–1911). "The Excavations at Phylakopi on Melos". The Annual of the British School at Athens. 17: 1–22.
- Dawkins, Richard M.; Droop, John Percival (1910–1911). "Byzantine Pottery from Sparta". The Annual of the British School at Athens. 17: 23–28. JSTOR 30096132.
- Dawkins, Richard M.; Laistner, Max Ludwig Wolfram (1912–1913). "The Excavation of the Kamares Cave in Crete". The Annual of the British School at Athens. 19: 1–34. JSTOR 30096925.
- Wace, Alan J. B.; Dawkins, Richard M. (1914). "Greek Embroideries: I: Ethnography". The Burlington Magazine. 26 (140): 49–50. JSTOR 859806.
- Wace, Alan J. B.; Dawkins, Richard M. (1914). "Greek Embroideries: II: The Towns and Houses of the Archipelago". The Burlington Magazine. 26 (141): 99–101, 104–107. JSTOR 859694.
- Bosanquet, Robert Carr; Dawkins, Richard M. (1923). The Unpublished Objects from the Palaikastro Excavations: 1902–1906. The British School at Athens, Supplementary Papers. Vol. 1. JSTOR 40855943.

== Works cited ==
- Boardman, John (1963). "Artemis Orthia and Chronology". The Annual of the British School at Athens. 58: 1–7. JSTOR 30102913.
- Brodie, Neil (2009). "A Reassessment of Mackenzie's Second and Third Cities at Phylakopi". The Journal of the British School at Athens. 104: 49–72. JSTOR 20745363.
- Bryer, Anthony (1988). "Byzantine and Modern Greek Studies: A Partial View". Byzantine and Modern Greek Studies. 12: 1–26. doi:10.1179/byz.1988.12.1.1.
- Bryer, Anthony (2009). "R. M. Dawkins, F. W. Hasluck and the 'Crypto-Christians' of Trebizond". British School at Athens Studies. 17: Scholars, Travels, Archives: Greek History and Culture Through the British School at Athens: 59–66. JSTOR 40960672.
- Cadogan, Gerald (2000). "The Pioneers: 1900–1914". In Huxley, Davina (ed.). Cretan Quests: British Explorers, Excavators and Historians. London: British School at Athens. pp. 15–27. ISBN 0-904887-37-5.
- Calligas, Eleni; Whitley, James, eds. (2005). On Site: British Archaeologists in Athens. Athens: Motivo. ISBN 960-6610-35-7.
- Catling, Hector (1998). "The Work of the British School at Athens at Sparta and in Laconia". British School at Athens Studies. 4: 19–27. JSTOR 40960254.
- Chatzitaki-Kapsomenou, Chrysoula (2002). Το νεοελληνικό λαϊκό παραμύθι [The Modern Greek Folk-Tale] (in Greek). Thessaloniki: Institute of Modern Greek Studies, Manolis Triantafyllidis Foundation. ISBN 978-960-231-098-4.
- Cormack, Robin (2016) [2000]. "Introduction". In Cormack, Robin; Jeffreys, Elizabeth (eds.). Through the Looking Glass: Byzantium Through British Eyes. Society for the Promotion of Byzantine Studies Publications. Vol. 7. Abingdon and New York: Routledge. pp. 1–8. ISBN 978-0-86078-667-2.
- Frantz, Alison (1983). "Multum in Parvo: The Aegean Island of Sikinos". Proceedings of the American Philosophical Society. 127 (2): 71–83. JSTOR 986190.
- Frantz, Alison; Thompson, Homer A.; Travlos, John (1969). "The 'Temple of Apollo Pythios' on Sikinos". American Journal of Archaeology. 73 (4): 397–422. doi:10.2307/503997. JSTOR 503997. S2CID 192962368.
- French, Ann (2009). "The Greek Embroidery Collecting of R. M. Dawkins and A. J. B. Wace". British School at Athens Studies. 17: Scholars, Travels, Archives: Greek History and Culture Through the British School at Athens: 77–90. JSTOR 40960674.
- Georges, Robert A. (1965). "Richard M. Dawkins: A Commemorative Essay on the Tenth Anniversary of His Death". Folklore. 76 (3): 202–212. JSTOR 1258587.
- Gill, David (2011). Sifting the Soil of Greece: The Early Years of the British School at Athens (1886–1919). Bulletin of the Institute of Classical Studies Supplements. Vol. 111. London: Institute of Classical Studies. ISBN 978-1-905670-32-1. JSTOR 44214938.
- Gill, David (2023). "Archaeologists, Curators, Collectors and Donors: Reflecting on the Past Through Archaeological Lives". In Lewis, Clare; Moshenska, Gabriel (eds.). Life-Writing in the History of Archaeology. London: UCL Press. pp. 353–378. ISBN 978-1-80008-451-3. JSTOR j.ctv37mk2fp.20.
- Halliday, W. R. (1955). "Obituary: R. M. Dawkins, 1871–1955". Folklore. 66 (2): 299–301. doi:10.1080/0015587X.1955.9717476. ISSN 0015-587X.
- Halliday, W. R.; Gill, David (21 May 2009) [23 September 2004]. "Dawkins, Richard MacGillivray (1871–1955), Scholar of Classical and Modern Greek". Oxford Dictionary of National Biography (online ed.). Oxford: Oxford University Press. doi:10.1093/ref:odnb/32749. (Subscription, Wikipedia Library access or UK public library membership required.)
- Hood, Rachel (1998). Faces of Archaeology in Greece: Caricatures by Piet de Jong. Oxford: Leopard's Head. ISBN 0-904920-38-0.
- Jenkins, R. J. H. (1955). "Richard MacGillivray Dawkins, 1871–1955" (PDF). Proceedings of the British Academy. 41: 373–388.
- Kotsonas, Antonis (2019). "Politics, Research Agendas and Abortive Fieldwork Plans over Lyktos, Crete". The Annual of the British School at Athens. 114: 399–443. JSTOR 26845277.
- Kunze, Emil (1933). "Review: The Sanctuary of Artemis Orthia at Sparta". Gnomon. 9 (1): 1–14. JSTOR 27674725.
- Lancaster, Osbert (1967). With an Eye to the Future. Boston: Houghton Mifflin. OCLC 1129850.
- Lee, Dorothy (1954). "Review: Forty-Five Stories from the Dodecanese by R. M. Dawkins". The Journal of American Folklore. 67 (264): 230–231. JSTOR 536237.
- Leigh Fermor, Patrick (1958). Mani: Travels in the Southern Peloponnese. London: John Murray. OCLC 11966995.
- J. M. (1956). "Obituary: R. M. Dawkins, 1871–1955". Man. 56: 7–8. JSTOR 2794890.
- Mackridge, Peter (1990). "'Some Pamphlets on Dead Greek Dialects': R. M. Dawkins and Modern Greek Dialectology". The Annual of the British School at Athens. 85: 201–212. doi:10.1017/S0068245400015641. JSTOR 30102847.
- Mackridge, Peter (2009). "From Archaeology to Dialectology and Folklore: The Role of the British School at Athens in the Career of R. M. Dawkins". British School at Athens Studies. 17: 49–58. ISSN 2159-4996. JSTOR 40960671.
- Mackridge, Peter (2016) [2000]. "R. M. Dawkins and Byzantium". In Cormack, Robin; Jeffreys, Elizabeth (eds.). Through the Looking Glass: Byzantium Through British Eyes. Society for the Promotion of Byzantine Studies Publications. Vol. 7. Abingdon and New York: Routledge. pp. 185–195. ISBN 978-0-86078-667-2.
- McCredie, James R. (June 2000). "Alison Frantz" (PDF). Proceedings of the American Philosophical Society. 144 (2): 213–217. ISSN 0003-049X. JSTOR 1515634. Archived from the original (PDF) on 2 November 2013.
- Mitchell, Peter (2003). "Some Reminiscences of the Coin Business I Joined and of Some Members Past" (PDF). British Numismatic Journal. 73: 197–212.
- Olsen, Birgit (2010) [2004]. "R. M. Dawkins and Greece". In Shankland, David (ed.). Archaeology, Anthropology and Heritage in the Balkans and Anatolia: The Life and Times of F. W. Hasluck, 1878–1920. Vol. 1. Piscataway: Gorgias Press. pp. 105–120. ISBN 978-1-61719-087-2.
- Pavlides, Nicolette (2025). "'Memoryscape' at the Spartan Menelaion". Hesperia. 94 (3): 305–341. doi:10.2972/hes.2025.a970044.
- Peatfield, Alan (2000). "The Pioneers: 1900–1914". In Huxley, Davina (ed.). Cretan Quests: British Explorers, Excavators and Historians. London: British School at Athens. pp. 138–150. ISBN 0-904887-37-5.
- Petrakos, Vasileios (1987). H Εν Aθήναις Aρχαιολογική Eταιρεία: H ιστορία των 150 χρόνων της [The Archaeological Society of Athens: The History of its 150 Years] (in Greek). Archaeological Society of Athens. OL 47766951M.
- Petrakos, Vasileios (2007). "The Stages of Greek Archaeology". In Valavanis, Panos (ed.). Great Moments in Greek Archaeology. Athens: Kapon Press. pp. 16–35. ISBN 978-0-89236-910-2.
- Rolfe, Frederick (1962). Woolf, Cecil (ed.). Letters to R. M. Dawkins. With an introduction by Laura M. Ragg. London: Vane. OCLC 1873953.
- Simpson, Cheryl (2015). "Greek Embroideries: The Early Collectors and their Ongoing Legacy". Modern Greek Studies. Special Edition: Reading, Interpreting, Experiencing: An Inter-Cultural Journey into Greek Letters: 186–198.
- Tomkins, Peter (2000). "The Neolithic Period". In Huxley, Davina (ed.). Cretan Quests: British Explorers, Excavators and Historians. London: British School at Athens. pp. 76–85. ISBN 0-904887-37-5.
- Ware, Kallistos (2009). "Three Different Views of the Holy Mountain: Athos Through the Eyes of F. W. Hasluck, R. M. Dawkins and Ph. Sherrard". British School at Athens Studies. 17: Scholars, Travels, Archives: Greek History and Culture Through the British School at Athens: 111–123. JSTOR 40960677.
