= Alan Wace =

British archaeologist (1879–1957)

Alan Wace FBA FSA
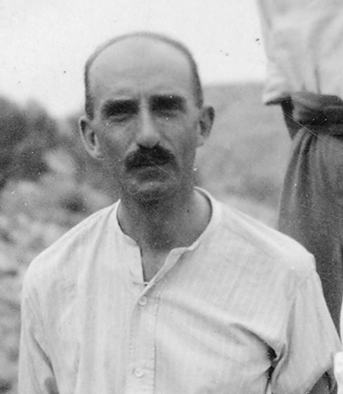
- Wace at Asine in 1922
- Born: Alan John Bayard Wace; 13 July 1879; Cambridge, England
- Died: 9 November 1957 (aged 78); Athens, Greece
- Resting place: First Cemetery of Athens
- Spouse: Helen Pence (m. 1925)
- Children: Elizabeth French

Academic background
- Education: Shrewsbury School; Pembroke College, Cambridge

Academic work
- Discipline: Archaeology
- Sub-discipline: Mycenaean civilisation
- Institutions: University of St Andrews; British School at Athens; Victoria and Albert Museum; University of Cambridge; Farouk I University

Alan John Bayard Wace FBA FSA (13 July 1879 – 9 November 1957) was an English archaeologist who served as director of the British School at Athens (BSA) between 1914 and 1923. (Note: The British School at Athens, like its sister institution, the British School at Rome, is a research institute specialising in archaeology, art history and classical studies. It is one of Greece's foreign archaeological institutes.) He excavated widely in Thessaly, Laconia, and Egypt, and at the Bronze Age site of Mycenae in Greece. He was also an authority on Greek textiles and a prolific collector of Greek embroidery.

Educated at Shrewsbury School and Pembroke College, Cambridge, Wace initially focused his scholarly interests on Ancient Greek sculpture and modern Greek anthropology. He first attended the BSA in 1902, before moving to the British School at Rome (BSR). While a member of the BSR, he discovered the Sanctuary of Artemis Orthia in Laconia in southern Greece, and participated in the BSA's excavations there and elsewhere in the region. Between 1907 and 1912, he surveyed widely in the northern Greek region of Thessaly, before taking a post at the Scottish University of St Andrews in 1912.

In 1914, Wace returned to the BSA as its director, though his archaeological work was soon interrupted by the outbreak of the First World War. During the war, he worked for the British intelligence services and excavated with his long-term collaborator Carl Blegen at the prehistoric site of Korakou. This project generated Wace and Blegen's theory of the long-term continuity of mainland Greek ("Helladic") culture, which contradicted the established scholarly view that Minoan Crete had been the dominant culture of the Aegean Bronze Age, and became known as the "Helladic Heresy". Wace excavated at Mycenae in the early 1920s, and established a chronological schema for the site's tholos tombs which largely proved the "Helladic Heresy" correct.

Wace lost his position at the BSA in 1923, and spent ten years as a curator of textiles at the Victoria and Albert Museum in London. In 1934, he returned to Cambridge as the Laurence Professor of Classical Archaeology, and resumed his covert work during the Second World War, serving as a section head for the British intelligence agency MI6 in Athens, Alexandria, and Cairo. He retired from Cambridge in 1944 and was appointed to a post at Alexandria's Farouk I University. During his tenure there, he continued to excavate at Mycenae and unsuccessfully attempted to locate the tomb of Alexander the Great. He was sacked after the 1952 Egyptian revolution, but continued to excavate, publish and study until his death in 1957. His daughter, Lisa French, accompanied him on several campaigns at Mycenae and later directed excavations there.

== Early life and education ==
Alan John Bayard Wace was born on 13 July 1879, at 4 Camden Place in Cambridge. (Note: Hood 1958, p. 158; Wills 2015, p. 148 (for Cambridge); Gill 2004 (for date and address).) He was the second son of Frederic Charles Wace, a justice of the peace and a mathematician at St John's College; his mother, Fanny (née Bayard), was descended from a family prominent in New York. Frederic Wace served as mayor of Cambridge in 1889–1891, (Note: The Eagle 1893, p. 545. Gill gives only his second term, from 1890 to 1891.) the first university academic to hold the post. He died in 1893, whereupon the family moved to Shrewsbury, and Wace (along with his elder brother Emeric) attended Shrewsbury School, a public school in the town, where he was head boy in 1898. He entered the University of Cambridge on a scholarship in the same year, matriculating in classics at Pembroke College. Emeric died shortly before the end of Wace's second year, in which Wace obtained a First, the highest possible grade, in Part I of the tripos examinations. Wace's tutor, the classicist R. A. Neil, suggested that he study classical archaeology for Part II, his final year: Wace subsequently achieved a First with distinction in the examinations of 1901. (Note: Gill 2004; Wills 2015, p. 148 (for the date).)

Wace acquired a particular interest in Ancient Greek sculpture from his teacher Charles Waldstein; he also gained an interest in the Aegean Bronze Age from William Ridgeway, the university's Disney Professor of Archaeology. Among his Cambridge contemporaries was the future folklorist and archaeologist R. M. Dawkins. In 1902, he attended the British School at Athens (BSA), one of Greece's foreign archaeological institutes, as a student, having won the Prendergast Scholarship to do so. While there, he completed a research project on reliefs and royal portraits in Hellenistic sculpture, part of which he published in the school's journal, Annual of the British School at Athens, in 1902. (Note: Gill 2004. Part of the project was published as Wace 1902.) The project became the nucleus of his 1935 monograph, An Approach to Greek Sculpture. (Note: A. W. Lawrence, who succeeded Wace as Laurence Professor at Cambridge, described An Approach to Greek Sculpture as "the only worthwhile work" on its subject.) His biographer David Gill describes Wace as "perhaps one of the strongest students of Hellenistic sculpture to emerge from Cambridge". Wace also developed an interest in Greek textiles, perhaps from the embroiderer Louisa Pesel, who became an associate of the BSA in the same year as Wace joined, or perhaps from the school's director, Robert Carr Bosanquet, who collected them.

== Early academic career ==
Wace (seated, furthest to viewer's left) photographed at the Artemis Orthia excavations in 1908. Sitting to the viewer's right of him is R. M. Dawkins; to Dawkins's right is Maurice Thompson. J. P. Droop stands second from the viewer's right.

Wace moved to the British School at Rome (BSR) in 1903 on a Craven studentship. He supplemented his income by working as a secretary to Ernest Gardner, a professor of classical art and archaeology at University College London and former director of the BSA, on Gardner's educational cruises for his students of the Aegean: these took place on SS Pelops during Easter 1903 and on SS Peneios during Easter 1904. Wace was elected as a fellow of Pembroke College in 1904. He worked briefly as a librarian at the BSR between 1905 and 1906, supported by a grant from the British government to allow the BSR to catalogue the sculptures in the Capitoline Museum, the Palazzo dei Conservatori and the Caelian Antiquarium. In the 1904–1905 season, he catalogued the Roman portrait sculptures of the Capitoline Museum, while the school's director, Henry Stuart Jones, catalogued its Greek ones. Jones resigned the directorship for reasons of ill health in 1905, and intended Wace to be his successor; however, the school's committee appointed Thomas Ashby as acting director in September of that year. Wace remained as librarian and acted as Ashby's assistant. (Note: Gill 2004; Wallace-Hadrill 2001, p. 28; Freeman 2007, pp. 313–314 (for Jones's ill health).) In the spring of 1906, the directorship was formally declared vacant; both Wace and Ashby applied, Ashby was appointed, and Wace was offered the assistant directorship, which he refused. He remained at the BSR; in 1909, he was considered as a possible successor to Ashby (whose contract was due to expire in 1911), though not appointed.

From 1904 onwards, the BSA was engaged in an extended campaign in the Laconia region of southern Greece. Wace took part in his first excavation in 1905, under the leadership of the BSA's Frederick William Hasluck at Geraki in Laconia. In the same year, he discovered the Sanctuary of Artemis Orthia near Sparta, where he would excavate as part of a BSA team several times over the ensuing seasons. Over the following years, he generally spent autumns in Rome and summers on archaeological fieldwork in Greece. Alongside the archaeologist Marcus Tod, he reviewed the artefacts stored in the Archaeological Museum of Sparta; Tod specialised in the inscriptions while Wace catalogued the sculptures and other finds. He excavated the Menelaion sanctuary in 1909 alongside Maurice S. Thompson and John Percival Droop; his publication of the lead votive objects deposited there was described by the archaeologist Hector Catling in 1998 as "definitive and of permanent value". He also excavated with the BSA at Sparta, and was given charge of the work on a Roman bathhouse known as the "Arapissa", (Note: Gill 2004; Wace 1906, p. 407) as well as that on the city's circuit wall. His other work in Laconia included the excavation of a number of tombs, a survey of the eastern coast of the Laconian Gulf, and a small-scale excavation of a shrine at Epidauros Limera. Outside Laconia, he worked with Gardner, who organised archaeological tours of Athens. Wace also contributed to a survey of Athens's Byzantine churches, collaborated on studies of the statue base of the charioteer Porphyrius and of the base of the Obelisk of Theodosius, both in Istanbul. In April 1905, he made a survey of the Magnesian peninsula in Thessaly alongside Albert William Van Buren of the American School of Classical Studies in Rome.

Bosanquet left the BSA in 1906; Wace was one of three candidates, alongside Dawkins and Duncan Mackenzie, shortlisted for the directorship. Wace was noted in a meeting of the school's managing committee as "a competent and keen worker and capable of extracting work from others", but was also considered inexperienced (being the youngest of the three), and the committee criticised his "slovenly" writing style. (Note: Arthur Evans would later accuse Wace of writing "like a pettifogging lawyer".) Wace was ultimately rejected in favour of Dawkins. Following Dawkins's appointment, he and Wace toured through the Dodecanese in the summer of 1906 and in 1907. The pair recorded inscriptions, collected embroidered artwork and pursued Dawkins's interest in modern Greek dialects. Wace organised an exhibition of Greek embroidery at Cambridge's Fitzwilliam Museum in 1906, almost exclusively composed of pieces he had collected with Dawkins and studied with Pesel and John Myers, another alumnus of the BSA. (Note: Simpson 2015, pp. 187–188; Dunbabin 1954, pp. 311–312 (for Myers's BSA connection).) Wace wrote articles for The Burlington Magazine, an academic journal covering fine art, throughout the first decade of the 1900s, and continued to exhibit his collection along with Dawkins, including at the Burlington Fine Arts Club in 1914.

Drawings of potsherds from the sites of Tsangli and Rakhmani in Thessaly, from Wace and Thompson's Prehistoric Thessaly

In June 1907, Wace and Droop travelled to Thessaly in northern Greece. Wace believed that the prehistoric sites of the region would provide evidence for the civilisation of Greece before the Bronze Age, in which it was then generally believed that Greece had come under the domination of Minoan Crete. Wace and Droop excavated Bronze Age tombs at Theotokou, where Wace had previously visited in 1905, and then proceeded to conduct field surveys in search of prehistoric mounds, known as magoulas. They discovered the mound of Zerelia in 1907, then returned with Thompson and funding from Cambridge University in June 1908. Wace and Thompson continued to visit Thessaly until 1912, recovering numerous artefacts which they donated to the Fitzwilliam Museum; the results of the work were published as Prehistoric Thessaly. The archaeologist Helen Waterhouse attributes Wace's later specialism in prehistory to the enthusiasm for Neolithic pottery he developed in Thessaly. During their Thessalian travels, Wace, Thompson and Arthur Woodward, with whom Wace made some of his visits, also noted several ancient inscriptions, some of which they published themselves; Woodward also published other texts collected by Wace and Thompson.

Between 1910 and 1912, Wace conducted, alongside Thompson, anthropological research among the nomadic Vlach people of Epirus. The two accompanied the Vlachs on their annual summer migration, which lasted eight days, from the lowland site of Tyrnavos to Samarina in the Pindus mountains: on the outbreak of the First Balkan War in October 1912, he wrote that "the annual disturbance" in the region had begun "earlier than usual". The hostilities halted his research, the results of which he published in a book co-authored with Thompson in 1914. By 1912, Wace was considered an expert on both Aegean prehistory and classical sculpture. That year, he took a post at the University of St Andrews in Scotland, as a lecturer in ancient history and archaeology. He left his fellowship at Pembroke in 1913.

== Appointment as director of the British School at Athens ==
Wace, who had previously served on the BSA's managing committee, succeeded Dawkins as director of the BSA in 1914. He accepted the offer of the directorate, which came with an annual salary of £500 (equivalent to £49,882 in 2025), at the managing committee meeting of 24 March, and took up office in the autumn, after the outbreak of the First World War. Wace's students at the BSA included the classical archaeologists Frank Stubbings, Vincent Desborough, Vronwy Hankey and Helen Waterhouse. Stubbings later recalled a humorous "open meeting" hosted by Wace at the BSA, in which he asked visiting academics to give a lecture based on six slides they had never previously seen. Georg Karo, the director of the German Archaeological Institute at Athens (DAI), attended the meeting in costume as a Fräulein.

=== First World War ===
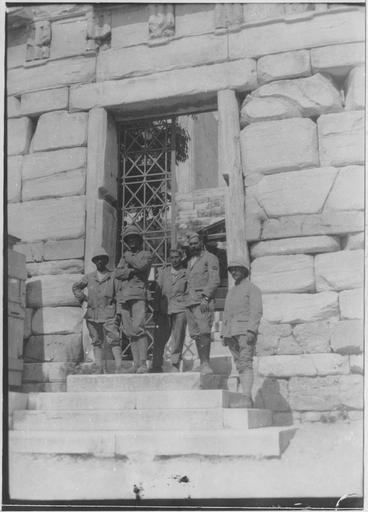
French troops at the Beulé Gate in 1917, during the Allied occupation of Athens

The First World War limited the opportunities for archaeological work in Greece and all but removed the usual influx of academic visitors to the BSA. Wace and Karo agreed that they should suspend contact between themselves and their institutions for the duration of the war: in a chance meeting on Christmas Day 1914, Karo told Wace that the professional relationship between the DAI and the BSA, and his own personal friendship with Wace, were "in abeyance" until the end of hostilities. Wace opened the school's hostel as accommodation to those employed by the British government: he was instructed by William Erskine, a British diplomat in the city, not to host anyone of whom Erskine disapproved.

Wace spent three weeks in January 1915 surveying in Macedonia, looking for potential excavation sites. During 1915–1916, Wace was posted to the chancery of the British legation to Greece, where he worked in cryptography and cryptanalysis. His work included organising support for British subjects fleeing the Ottoman Empire, as well as gathering military intelligence from them. Late in 1915, after the Gallipoli landings, Wace devised and established the British passport control office in Athens, which served as a front for British intelligence, in which he identified people suspected of attempting to travel to British-controlled Egypt as spies. He spent his free time during the war tending to the BSA's garden, organising its library and its antiquities collection, and working on Mycenaean pottery in the National Archaeological Museum.

Although the BSA was forbidden to excavate from 1914, the American School of Classical Studies (ASCSA) continued its excavations in the following two years, during which both the United States and Greece were officially uninvolved in the conflict. Wace joined the ASCSA's secretary, Carl Blegen, in the ASCSA's excavations of the Early Bronze Age site of Korakou in the Corinthia during 1915 and 1916. Their excavations led to a joint publication in which they argued that Greek culture had existed continuously since the early Bronze Age, and that "archaic and, consequently, classical Greek art was a renaissance ... of the same artistic spirit that inspired Knossos and Phaestos, Tiryns and Mycenae". Their argument that the culture of Bronze Age Greece was primarily "Mycenaean as opposed to Cretan" ran contrary to the prevailing opinion of the time, by which Minoan Crete was considered the dominant influence on mainland Greece. Droop later called Wace and Blegen's ideas the "Helladic Heresy".

On 1 December [O.S. 18 November] 1916, British and French forces invaded Piraeus, the harbour of Athens, in an attempt to overturn Greece's neutrality in the war. Wace and other British officials were evacuated onto the troop ship HMT Abbassieh, which remained outside Athens until the following year. During his enforced lodging there, Wace explored the eastern side of the island of Salamis, a short distance from Piraeus, and reported to the Greek authorities on the need for conservation work on some ancient wall-paintings there. The BSA was closed during this period, which was later referred to by Rachel Hood, the wife of the BSA director Sinclair Hood, as the "difficult times". Wace continued to work for the British legation. On the school's reopening in 1917, he was appointed to a committee of the Greek Ministry of Education to award prizes for sculpture and painting.

== Post-war archaeology and the "Helladic Heresy" ==
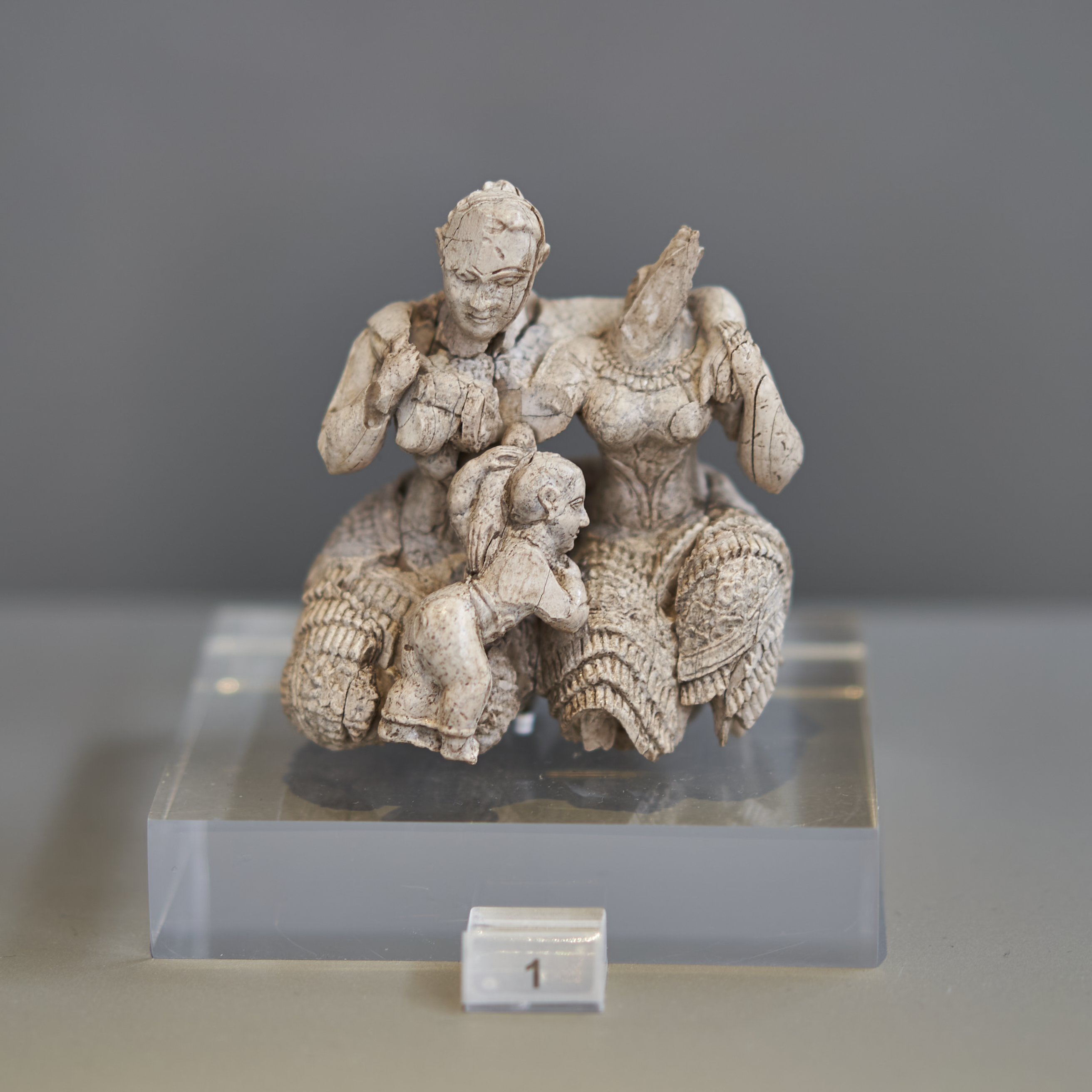
Figurine, known as the "Ivory Triad", found by Wace on the citadel of Mycenae in 1939, called "the most remarkable of all Mycenaean ivories" by Waterhouse in 1986

In November 1919, Wace's contract as director of the BSA was renewed for another three years, and he left the British legation. Gill credits Wace's reputation with attracting several non-British students to the BSA, including the Swedish Etruscologist Axel Boëthius and the papyrologist Jacob Hondius. Wace also assisted in the foundation of the Museum of Greek Handicrafts. He suggested expanding the BSA's archaeological remit to include the study of geology and botany, but his proposals were not enacted. As a result of political rioting, which took place in Athens at the end of July 1920, Wace opened the hostel of the BSA to women, against the opposition of some of the school's managing committee. (Note: Hood 1998, p. 44. For the riots in Athens, see Travlos 2020, p. 384) According to the archaeologist Bernard Ashmole, the decision was ultimately forced when the British Minister to Greece ordered all British students in Athens, male and female, to be moved into the hostel during Wace's absence in November. (Note: Quoted in Gill 2002, p. 501.)

In the early 1920s, Wace led the excavations of the BSA at the site of Mycenae in southern Greece. The project was encouraged by Arthur Evans, who had excavated at Knossos on Crete from 1900 and introduced the concept of "Minoan Civilisation" to scholarship. Mycenae had previously been established, after the 1876–1877 excavations at Grave Circle A there, as the type site for the "Mycenaean" civilisation of the mainland. Evans hoped that further excavations at Mycenae would provide evidence for his theory that Knossos was the centre of the dominant power of the Bronze Age Aegean, in line with the Classical myths of a Cretan thalassocracy under King Minos. (Note: See e.g. Thucydides 1.4: John Pendlebury would later explicitly connect the myth of Minos with Knossos under the label of the "Minoan thalassocracy".) Evans assisted the BSA in persuading both the Greek government and the archaeologist Christos Tsountas, who held the necessary permit, to allow them to excavate with Wace as field director. He also supported the excavation financially, donating £100 (equivalent to £3,864 in 2025) towards the excavation of the monument known as the Tomb of Aegisthus.

The main priority of the excavations was to establish the chronological relationship between the shaft graves of Grave Circle A and the much larger tholos tombs at the site. Evans believed that the two sets of tombs were broadly contemporary, and that both represented the burials of Cretan-based rulers of Mycenae. This ran contrary to the view proposed by Wace and Blegen in 1918, by which the culture of mainland Greece ("Helladic" culture) had remained fundamentally autochthonous through the Shaft Graves period until the end of the Bronze Age. Under Wace and Blegen's model, the tholoi were correctly dated considerably later than both Grave Circle A (c. 1600–1450 BCE) and the apogee of Neopalatial Minoan civilisation on Crete, which ended around 1500 BCE. This would represent a "crescendo" of monumentality and elaboration in Mycenae's tombs, whereas Evans had argued that Mycenae had become subjected and subordinated to Crete, and that this produced a "diminuendo" in the site's wealth and ostentation. According to Evans, the oldest tombs on the site were the largest and most developed: the two tholoi known as the Treasury of Atreus and the Tomb of Clytemnestra.

In 1920 and 1921, Wace made small-scale excavations in the Treasury of Atreus, which failed to find conclusive evidence for its date. Between 15 June and 8 July 1922, the Tomb of Aegisthus was excavated under Winifred Lamb, who was serving as Wace's second-in-charge. This would be the only tomb fully excavated during the 1920–1923 campaigns, though Wace had all the tholoi re-examined and their first architectural plans drawn up by the Anglo-Dutch draughtsman Piet de Jong, whom Wace hired in 1920 for what was de Jong's first archaeological job. Planned excavations of the Treasury of Atreus in 1923 had to be abandoned because of safety concerns about the tomb's roof, which had partially collapsed.

By May 1923, Wace and Lamb had constructed the outline of a three-phase chronological model for the tholoi at Mycenae, in which they argued for a progressive increase in the scale and monumentality of the tombs. They were able to date the Tomb of Aegisthus to early LH IIA (c. 1510–1480 BCE), and to show that it was earlier than the larger Treasury of Atreus, thereby providing strong evidence for Wace and Blegen's chronological model. Evans reacted bitterly to Wace's findings, disputing the chronological judgements he had made and writing to Droop that he had "never yet [seen] any work so systematically wrong-headed." During the period of his work at Mycenae, Wace also assisted Blegen in the ASCSA's excavations at Zygouries, a site between Mycenae and Corinth.

Wace remained at the BSA until later in 1923, when the school's managing committee declined to renew his appointment. Waterhouse suggests that this was due to Wace's disfavour with influential members of the committee, who had disagreed with his decision to excavate at Mycenae, preferring the school to focus on sites of the classical period. The historian Cathy Gere has suggested that Evans, a member of the committee, may have been the primary force behind Wace's departure. (Note: Gere 2006, p. 113. For Evans's committee membership, see "Rules and Regulations of the British School at Athens", 1923–1926) Several Greek professors and archaeological ephors wrote to the BSA's London committee, expressing their regret at the decision and crediting Wace with establishing "the very high scientific reputation" of the school. Wace was succeeded by Arthur Woodward, who had been his deputy director since 1910.

== Victoria and Albert Museum ==
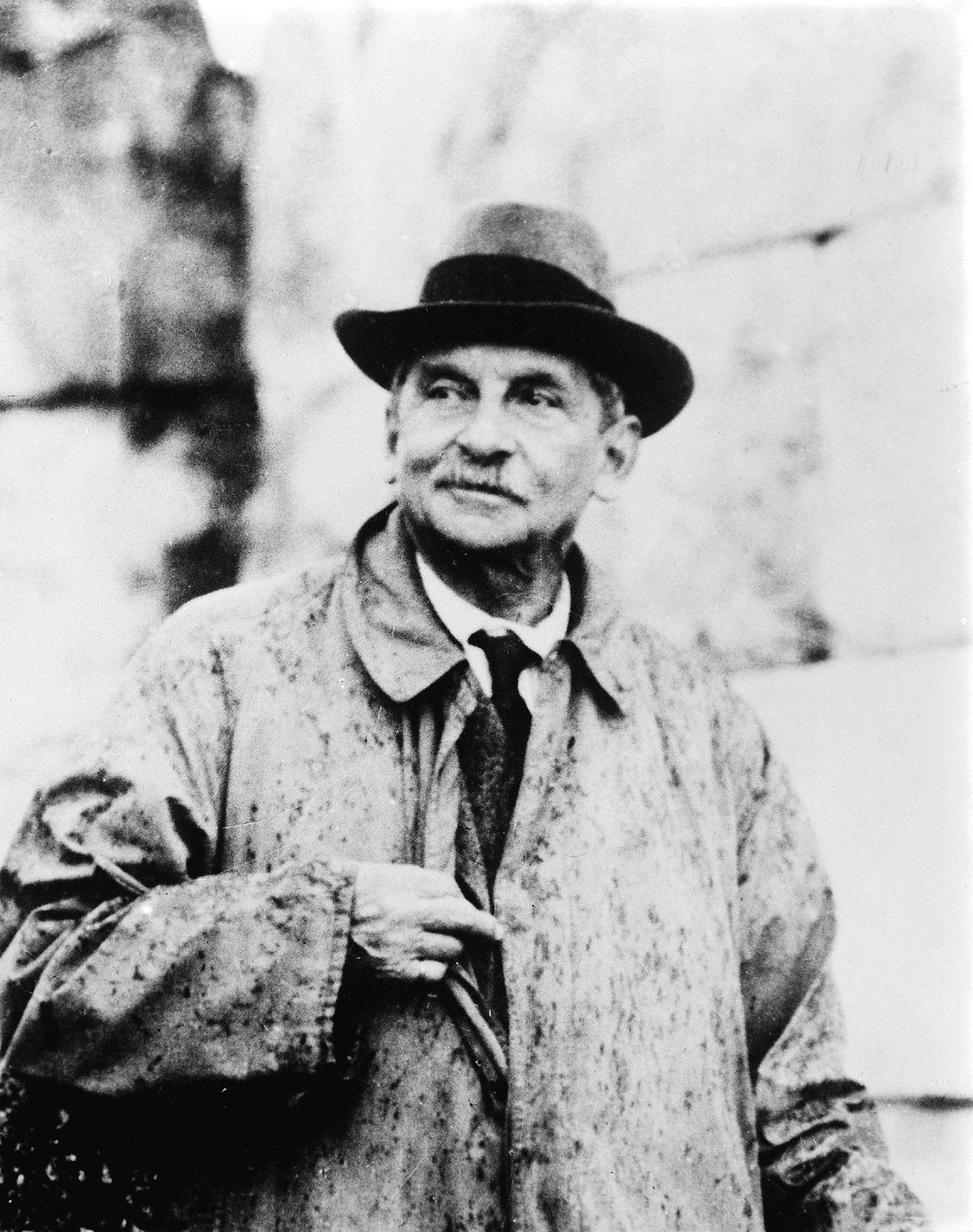
Arthur Evans was a prominent critic of Wace's ideas about the relationship between Minoan and Mycenaean civilisation, which were dubbed the "Helladic Heresy".

After leaving the BSA, Wace lectured at Princeton University in 1923 and at the Archaeological Institute of America in 1923–1924. He was offered a post at the University of Pennsylvania Museum in 1924, but refused it to take care of family commitments in Britain, following the death of his brother-in-law. He also declined in 1925 an invitation to excavate at Beth She'an in Mandatory Palestine on the museum's behalf. Evans continued to write critically of Wace in the press, including in The Times in April 1924. Wace, meanwhile, was selected to write the chapters on the Aegean Bronze Age for the Cambridge Ancient History.

Wace worked between 1924 and 1934 as deputy keeper of textiles at the Victoria and Albert Museum (V&A) in London. The Greek embroideries he collected with Dawkins formed the basis of the V&A's collection of these objects. While at the V&A, he published widely on embroidery from various periods, including a preface for Louisa Pesel's 1929 handbook for embroiderers based on seventeenth-century samplers and an exhibition catalogue co-written with his wife in the same year. In 1929, he organised the Exhibition of English Decorative Art, held at Lansdowne House, described in one of Wace's obituaries as his greatest achievement in the field of textiles. Wace did not return to archaeology in Greece during this period, though he joined Blegen at the latter's excavations of Troy in 1933.

In 1926, Wace was asked by Sydney Cockerell, director of the Fitzwilliam Museum, to authenticate a marble statuette (later known as the "Fitzwilliam Goddess") being offered for sale to the museum by Charles Seltman, a lecturer in classics at Queens' College, Cambridge. The statue was claimed to be Minoan in date: Wace considered it authentic, as subsequently did Evans. Wace wrote about the statuette in The Times, declaring it "the earliest piece of true sculpture found on Greek soil"; in a letter to Cockerell on 12 February, he called it "ravishingly beautiful". By the end of the year, the statue was widely suspected to be a forgery: Wace published a monograph on it in May 1927, titled A Cretan Statuette in the Fitzwilliam Museum: A Study in Minoan Costume, but reviews of the book in 1928 largely doubted the piece's authenticity. The museum recategorised it as "of uncertain date or authenticity" in 1961 and removed it from display in 1991; by this point, it was generally considered a forgery dating from the 1920s.

== Laurence Professorship at Cambridge ==
Wace became the second holder of the Laurence Professorship of Classical Archaeology, succeeding Arthur Bernard Cook on the latter's retirement in 1934. He maintained his interest in Greek textiles, writing a 1935 catalogue for an exhibition entitled Mediterranean and Near Eastern Embroideries, based on the collection of Beatrice Lindell Cook, whose husband had collected them in Egypt; the book is still considered a standard work in the twenty-first century. (Note: Simpson 2015, p. 190; Gill 2004 (for the Cooks).)

Wace returned to Mycenae in July 1939, following a visiting appointment at the University of Toronto in the early part of that year. His excavations discovered the part of the "Prehistoric Cemetery", predominantly consisting of chamber tombs, on the acropolis slope west of the citadel. He also made new excavations of the Treasury of Atreus, which proved that the tomb had been constructed no later than the LH IIIA1 period (c. 1400 – c. 1300 BCE). (Note: Hope Simpson & Dickinson 1979, p. 34; Shelmerdine 2008, p. 4 (for the dates).) When the Second World War broke out in September, Wace moved back into the BSA with his family. He worked as a section head for the Inter-Services Liaison Department, the name used in the Middle East by the British military intelligence agency MI6. Wace resumed his previous cover as a passport control officer, monitoring international communications and the activities of Axis intelligence agencies. In March 1940, he gave a public lecture on Mycenae, which was attended by King Georgios of Greece. During the winter of 1940–1941, at which time Greece was under invasion from Italy, Wace collaborated with the Greek archaeologist Spyridon Marinatos on a study of the façade of the Treasury of Atreus.

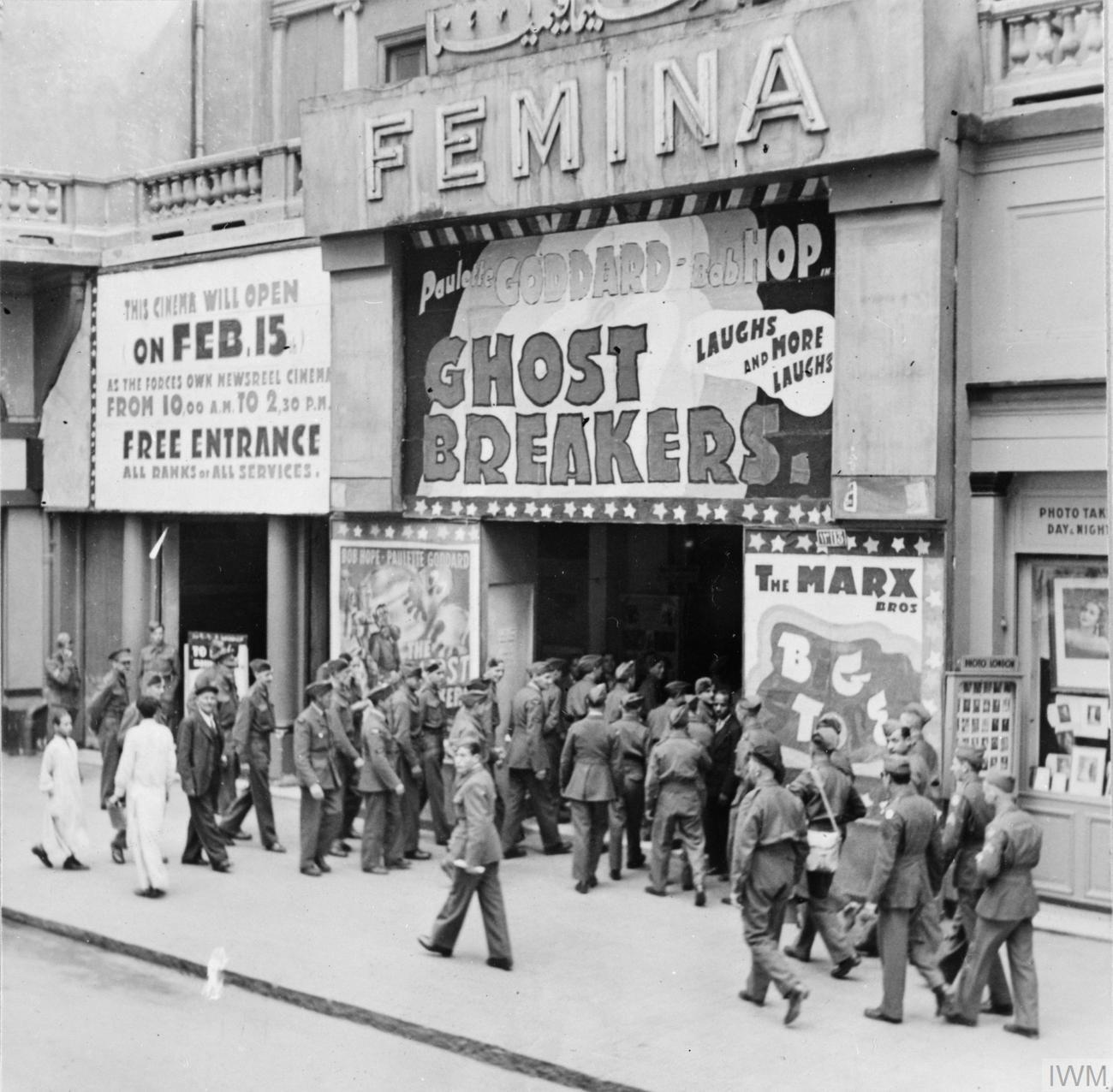
British soldiers in Cairo, 1943: Wace conducted intelligence work in the city after his evacuation from Greece.

In April 1941, shortly before the fall of Greece to Axis forces in May, Wace and other British intelligence officers relocated to Alexandria in Egypt, where he debriefed British troops evacuated there from Greece. He subsequently worked for MI6 in Cairo. His duties included editing and publishing intelligence reports, and he ran the department providing false passports and documentation to agents of the British Special Operations Executive operating in the Aegean. He was evacuated briefly to Jerusalem in 1942, shortly before the First Battle of El Alamein. To assist with his espionage work, he called on the archaeologist and BSA alumnus Martin Robertson, who joined him in Cairo in late 1942. Wace developed a cooperative relationship with Rodney Young, an American archaeologist turned intelligence officer, who established the "Greek Desk" of the Office of Strategic Services in the city from 1943: their acquaintance allowed British and American intelligence to avoid the inter-Allied rivalry that characterised their relationship in İzmir.

Wace retired from his Cambridge professorship in 1944, having reached the age limit of sixty-five for normal service and realising that he would be unable to return to Cambridge during the war. He was subsequently appointed, on the encouragement of the British Council, as professor of classics and classical archaeology for Alexandria's Farouk I University. (Note: Known since 1952 as Alexandria University.)

== Professorship at Alexandria and retirement ==
Alongside the French Egyptologist Étienne Drioton, Wace organised a 1944 exhibition of Coptic art in Cairo. Shortly after the Second World War, he loaned his extensive collection of Greek embroideries to the Liverpool Museum, which later purchased them. In 1947, he attempted to find the Tomb of Alexander the Great in Alexandria, unsuccessfully excavating at a hill known as Kom al-Dikka, then widely believed to be the tomb's location. He also excavated a Hellenistic temple at Hermopolis Magna in central Egypt, dedicated to the Ptolemaic ruler Ptolemy III; the results of this project were published posthumously in 1959. (Note: Gill 2004; Spawforth 2020, n. 69 (for details of the Hermopolis temple); Wace, Megaw & Skeat 1959.) During the 1950s, he wrote short stories featuring a fictional archaeologist named George Evesham; two of these were published in the journal Archaeology.

Wace was a member of the Institute for Advanced Study (IAS) in Princeton, New Jersey, from September to December 1948: there, he completed his archaeological guide to Mycenae, published in 1949. He returned to the IAS between January and June 1951. He made further excavations at Mycenae between 1950 and 1955, following the end of the Greek Civil War in October 1949. His excavations in 1952 discovered the first tablets written in the prehistoric Linear B script known from the site. In 1952, violence in the British-administered Suez Canal Zone, including the killing of fifty Egyptian police officers in January, led to a military coup which overthrew King Farouk and imposed a nationalist government led by Mohamed Naguib and Gamal Abdel Nasser. The new government sacked Wace, who moved to Cyprus, and later to a flat in Athens. From 1952 until 1955, he visited Princeton each year: he maintained membership of the IAS between September 1952 and June 1954. He also undertook study seasons at Mycenae in 1956 and 1957.

Wace experienced poor cardiovascular health over a period of several years. He suffered a heart attack in the spring of 1957, though was able later that year to assist with the rearrangement of the Mycenaean Room of the National Archaeological Museum of Athens, and to attend the resumption of the Mycenae excavations under John Papadimitriou. Wace died of a further heart attack on 9 November 1957, at his home in Athens. (Note: Hood 1958, p. 158; The New York Times, 11 November 1957.) He was buried in the Protestant section of the First Cemetery of Athens.

== Personal life, character and honours ==
The writer Compton Mackenzie, who directed British intelligence in Athens during the First World War and met Wace during the latter's work with British refugees from Turkey during 1915–1916, (Note: Gill 2004. For Mackenzie's wartime position, see Clogg 2009, p. 164.) wrote of him as:

A delightful combination of great scholarship and humour, a worldly humour too and not in the least pedagogic ... a tall, slim man full of nervous energy, with a fresh complexion and an extraordinarily merry pair of light blue eyes.

Wace's former student Frank Stubbings, in a 1958 obituary, described Wace as being "virtually incapable of making even a rough sketch of any object", despite an outstanding visual memory. He went on to describe Wace as having "a slightly ponderous indignation with those whom (often rightly) he thought stupid and pretentious", but as being "really a very modest man, sensitive, and easily hurt, but full of kindness and, in the right company, of fun." The historian Arnold Toynbee, who visited the BSA in the 1911–1912 academic year, described Wace and Thompson thus:

They hunted together like a couple of hounds; and, like hounds on the scent, they were indifferent, while chasing their quarry, to heat, cold, hunger, or exposure to the elements. They set one an exacting standard of physical endurance.

Wace was married to the American archaeologist Helen Wace (née Pence), a former student of the BSR who had worked on the Roman port of Ostia. The couple met at Mycenae in June 1922 and became engaged on a yacht cruise in May 1923, which was also attended by Blegen and his fellow American archaeologists Bert Hodge Hill and Leicester Holland, as well as all three of their future wives, Elizabeth Pierce, Ida Thallon, and Louise Adams. Wace and Pence married in St Albans on 20 June 1925; the archaeologist Elizabeth (Lisa) Bayard French, born in 1931, was their daughter. Lisa Wace attended her father's excavations at Mycenae from the age of eight, and directed excavations there from 1959 to 1969 alongside William Taylour. In 1964, Helen Wace published a series of Alan's fictional writings as Greece Untrodden. She also completed his monograph on the tapestries from the collection of John Churchill, 1st Duke of Marlborough, at Blenheim Palace for publication in 1968: a review in History Today praised her work and called it "a fitting tribute to this notable scholar".

Wace was made a doctor honoris causa of the University of Amsterdam in 1932, of the University of Liverpool in 1935, of the University of Pennsylvania in 1940, and of the University of Cambridge in 1951. He was elected to the American Philosophical Society in 1945, (Note: Blegen 1958, p. 162; "APS Member History". American Philosophical Society. 2019.) as a Fellow of the British Academy in 1947, and as a Fellow of the Society of Antiquaries. In 1951, he was made an honorary fellow of Pembroke College, Cambridge, and was also the honorand of a special edition of the Annual of the British School at Athens to commemorate his fifty years in archaeology. In 1952, he was made an officer of the Patriarchal Order of St. Mark the Evangelist, Alexandria. He was also an honorary member of the Archaeological Society of Athens, the Society for the Promotion of Hellenic Studies, and of the Royal Society of Archaeology of Alexandria. In 1953, he received the Petrie Medal, awarded by the University of London for distinguished contributions to archaeology.

== Published works ==
=== As sole author ===
- Wace, Alan (1902). "Apollo Seated on the Omphalos: A Statue at Alexandria". The Annual of the British School at Athens. 9: 211–242. doi:10.1017/S0068245400007681. JSTOR 30096271. S2CID 191404096.
- — (1903). "Recent Excavations in Asia Minor". The Journal of Hellenic Studies. 23: 335–355. doi:10.2307/623796. JSTOR 623796.
- — (1903). "Grotesques and the Evil Eye". The Annual of the British School at Athens. 10: 103–114. doi:10.1017/S0068245400002100. JSTOR 30096289.
- — (1905). "Hellenistic Royal Portraits". The Journal of Hellenic Studies. 25: 86–104. doi:10.2307/624210. JSTOR 624210.
- — (1905). "Laconia: V. Frankish Sculptures at Parori and Geraki". The Annual of the British School at Athens. 11: 139–145. doi:10.1017/S0068245400002525. JSTOR 30096320.
- — (1906). "II—Excavations at Sparta, 1906: § 11.—The Roman Baths. (Arapissa)". The Annual of the British School at Athens. 12: 407–414. doi:10.1017/S0068245400008212. JSTOR 30096368. S2CID 163185974.
- — (1906). "Some Sculptures at Turin". The Journal of Hellenic Studies. 26: 235–242. doi:10.2307/624376. JSTOR 624376.
- — (1906). "The Topography of Pelion and Magnesia". The Journal of Hellenic Studies. 26: 143–168. doi:10.2307/624345. JSTOR 624345.
- — (1908). "The Menelaion: The Lead Figurines". The Annual of the British School at Athens. 15: 127–134. JSTOR 30096408.
- — (1909). "Laconia: III: Early Pottery from Geraki". The Annual of the British School at Athens. 16: 72–75. doi:10.1017/S0068245400001660. JSTOR 30096435.
- — (1909). "North Greek Festivals and the Worship of Dionysos". The Annual of the British School at Athens. 16: 232–253. doi:10.1017/S006824540000174X. JSTOR 30096443.
- — (1923a). "Early Aegean Civilization". In Bury, John Bagnell; Cook, Stanley Arthur; Adcock, Frank Ezra (eds.). The Cambridge Ancient History. Vol. 1. Cambridge University Press. pp. 589–618. OCLC 1041622965.
- — (1923b). "Excavations at Mycenae § VI — The Campaign of 1923". The Annual of the British School at Athens. 25: 5–8. doi:10.1017/S0068245400010352. S2CID 183795426.
- — (1924). "Crete and Mycenae". In Bury, John Bagnell; Cook, Stanley Arthur; Adcock, Frank Ezra (eds.). The Cambridge Ancient History. Vol. 2. Cambridge University Press. pp. 431–472. OCLC 1041622965.
- — (18 September 1926). "The Beehive Tomb of the 'King' and 'Queen' at Dendra" (PDF). The Illustrated London News. pp. 490–491.
- — (1927). A Cretan Statuette in the Fitzwilliam Museum: A Study in Minoan Costume. Cambridge University Press. OCLC 472569819.
- — (1932). Chamber Tombs at Mycenae. Oxford: J. Johnson. OCLC 2989197.
- — (1934). "The Veil of Despoina". American Journal of Archaeology. 38 (1): 107–111. doi:10.2307/498936. JSTOR 498936.
- — (1935). An Approach to Greek Sculpture. Cambridge University Press. OCLC 504175541.
- — (1948). "Notes on Roman Sculpture". Revue Archéologique. 31/32 (2): 1088–1097. JSTOR 41028778.
- — (1948). "The Sarcophagus of Alexander the Great". Farouk University Bulletin of the Faculty of Arts. 4: 1–11.
- — (1948). "Weaving or Embroidery?". American Journal of Archaeology. 52 (1): 51–55. doi:10.2307/500552. JSTOR 500552.
- — (1949). Mycenae: An Archaeological History and Guide. Princeton University Press. OCLC 1879252.
- — (1949). "Prehistoric Stone Figures from the Mainland". Commemorative Studies in Honor of Theodore Leslie Shear (PDF). Hesperia Supplements. Vol. 8. Princeton: American School of Classical Studies at Athens. pp. 423–426, 500. doi:10.2307/1353917. JSTOR 1353917. OCLC 4846630.
- — (1950). "Excavations at Mycenae, 1939". The Annual of the British School at Athens. 45: 203–228. doi:10.1017/S0068245400006778. JSTOR 30096755.
- — (1951). "Notes on the Homeric House". The Journal of Hellenic Studies. 71: 203–211. doi:10.2307/628203. JSTOR 628203.
- — (1952). "The Island of Pelos". Archaeology. 5 (4): 205–210. JSTOR 41663084.
- — (1953). "Excavations at Mycenae 1952". Proceedings of the American Philosophical Society. 97 (3): 248–253. JSTOR 3143747.
- — (1953). "New Light on Homer – Excavations at Mycenae, 1952". Archaeology. 6 (2): 75–81. JSTOR 41666006.
- — (22 March 1954). "The Coming of the Greeks". The Classical Weekly. Vol. 47, no. 10. pp. 152–155. JSTOR 4343578.
- — (1954). "Ivory Carvings from Mycenae". Archaeology. 7 (3): 149–155. JSTOR 41663221.
- — (1954). "The Golden Ring". Archaeology. 7 (1): 42–47. JSTOR 41663204.
- — (1960). "A Mycenaean Mystery". Archaeology. 13 (1): 40–43. JSTOR 41663733.
- — (1962). Stubbings, Frank H. (ed.). A Companion to Homer. London and New York: Macmillan. OCLC 260023.
- — (1964). Greece Untrodden. Illustrated by Elektra Megaw. Athens: Helen Wace. OCLC 1354768401.
- — (1968). The Marlborough Tapestries at Blenheim Palace and Their Relation to Other Military Tapestries of the War of the Spanish Succession. London: Phaidon. ISBN 978-0-7148-1322-6. (Note: Largely written in the 1930s, but completed for publication by Helen Wace after Alan's death.)

=== As co-author ===
- Wace, Alan; Hasluck, Frederick William (1905). "Laconia: I. Excavations near Angelona". The Annual of the British School at Athens. 11: 81–90. doi:10.1017/S0068245400002446. JSTOR 30096316.
- Wace, Alan; Hasluck, Frederick William; Tillyard, Henry Julius Wetenhall (1905). "Laconia: II. Geraki". The Annual of the British School at Athens. 11: 91–123. doi:10.1017/S0068245400002458. JSTOR 30096317.
- Dawkins, Richard MacGillivray; Wace, Alan (1906). "Notes from the Sporades, Astypalaea, Telos, Nisyros, Leros". The Annual of the British School at Athens. 12: 151–174. doi:10.1017/S0068245400008042. JSTOR 30096350.
- Tod, Marcus Niebuhr; Wace, Alan (1906). A Catalogue of the Sparta Museum. Oxford University Press. OCLC 504175738 – via Internet Archive.
- Wace, Alan; Droop, John Percival (1907). "Excavations at Theotokou, Thessaly". The Annual of the British School at Athens. 13: 309–327. doi:10.1017/S0068245400002951. S2CID 131595659.
- Dawkins, Richard MacGillivray; Droop, John Percival; Farrell, Jerome; Woodward, Arthur Maurice; Dickins, Guy; Wace, Alan (1908). "Laconia: I. Excavations at Sparta, 1908". The Annual of the British School at Athens. 14: 1–160. doi:10.1017/S0068245400003117. JSTOR 30096391.
- Wace, Alan; Thompson, Maurice Scott (1908). "A Cave of the Nymphs on Mount Ossa". The Annual of the British School at Athens. 13: 243–247. JSTOR 30096414.
- Wace, Alan; Hasluck, Frederick William (1908). "Laconia: II. Topography". The Annual of the British School at Athens. 15: 158–176. doi:10.1017/S0068245400017585. JSTOR 30096409.
- Dawkins, Richard MacGillivray; Droop, John Percival; Woodward, Arthur M.; Giles, P.; Wace, Alan; Thompson, Maurice Scott (1908). "Laconia: I. Excavations at Sparta, 1908". The Annual of the British School at Athens. 15: 1–157. doi:10.1017/S0068245400017524. JSTOR 30096408.
- Traquair, Ramsay; Wace, Alan (1909). "The Base of the Obelisk of Theodosius". Journal of Hellenic Studies. 29: 60–69. doi:10.2307/624643. JSTOR 624643. S2CID 161973074.
- Wace, Alan; Thompson, Maurice Scott (1911). "A Latin Inscription from Perrhaebia". The Annual of the British School at Athens. 17: 193–204. doi:10.1017/S0068245400008571. JSTOR 30096144.
- Woodward, Arthur Maurice; Wace, Alan (1912). "Appendix: The Monument of Porphyrios". The Church of Saint Eirene at Constantinople, with an Historical Notice by Alexander van Millingen, and an Appendix on The Monument of Porphyrios by A. M. Woodward and A. J. B. Wace. By George, Walter S. Oxford: Byzantine Research and Publication Fund. pp. 79–84. OCLC 4923394.
- Wace, Alan; Thompson, Maurice Scott (1912). Prehistoric Thessaly: Being Some Account of Recent Excavations and Explorations in North-Eastern Greece from Lake Kopais to the Borders of Macedonia. Cambridge University Press. OCLC 26839683.
- Wace, Alan; Dawkins, Richard M. (1914). "Greek Embroideries: I: Ethnography". The Burlington Magazine. 26 (140): 49–50. JSTOR 859806.
- Wace, Alan; Dawkins, Richard M. (1914). "Greek Embroideries: II: The Towns and Houses of the Archipelago". The Burlington Magazine. 26 (141): 99–101, 104–107. JSTOR 859694.
- Wace, Alan; Lawrence, William Matthew Trevor (1914). Catalogue of a Collection of Old Embroideries of the Greek Islands and Turkey. London: Burlington Fine Arts Club. OCLC 1157960365 – via Internet Archive.
- Wace, Alan; Thompson, Maurice Scott (1914). The Nomads of the Balkans: An Account of Life and Customs Among the Vlachs of Northern Pindus. London: Methuen. OCLC 504175738.
- Wace, Alan; Blegen, Carl (1918). "The Pre-Mycenaean Pottery of the Mainland". The Annual of the British School at Athens. 22: 175–189. doi:10.1017/S0068245400009916. S2CID 163842512.
- Wace, Alan; Lamb, Winifred (1922). "Excavations at Mycenae Daybook 1922". University of Cambridge Digital Library.
- Wace, Alan; Holland, Leicester (1923). "Excavations at Mycenae § IX — The Tholos Tombs". The Annual of the British School at Athens. 25: 283–402. doi:10.1017/S0068245400010352. S2CID 183795426.
- Wace, Alan; Megaw, A. H. S.; Skeat, T. H. (1959). Hermopolis Magna, Ashmunein: The Ptolemaic Sanctuary and the Basilica. Alexandria University Press. OCLC 8135724.
- Wace, Alan; Hood, M. Sinclair; Cook, John Manuel (1953). "The Epano Phournos Tholos Tomb". The Annual of the British School at Athens. Mycenae 1939–1952. 48: 19–29. doi:10.1017/S0068245400012466. JSTOR 30096964.
- Wace, Alan; Holland, Marian; Hood, M. Sinclair; Cook, John Manuel (1953). "The Perseia Fountain House". The Annual of the British School at Athens. Mycenae 1939–1952. 48: 69–84. doi:10.1017/S0068245400012466. JSTOR 30096962.

== Bibliography ==
- "Alan John Bayard Wace". The Times. 11 November 1957. Archived from the original on 16 January 2011 – via V&A Museum.
- Allen, Susan Heuck (2011). Classical Spies: American Archaeologists with the OSS in World War II Greece. Ann Arbor: University of Michigan Press. ISBN 9780472035397.
- Beaton, Roderick (2019). Greece: Biography of a Modern Nation. Chicago: University of Chicago Press. ISBN 9780226673745.
- Blegen, Carl (1958). "Alan John Bayard Wace (1879–1957)". American Philosophical Society Yearbook: 162–171. ISSN 0065-9762.
- Butcher, Kevin; Gill, David W. (1993). "The Director, the Dealer, the Goddess, and Her Champions: The Acquisition of the Fitzwilliam Goddess". American Journal of Archaeology. 97 (3): 383–401. doi:10.2307/506362. ISSN 0002-9114. JSTOR 506362. S2CID 192947241.
- Catling, Hector (1998). "The Work of the British School at Athens at Sparta and in Laconia". British School at Athens Studies. 4: 19–27. ISSN 2159-4996. JSTOR 40960254.
- Chandler, David Geoffrey (August 1968). "The Marlborough Tapestries at Blenheim Palace". History Today. 18 (8): 587–588. ISSN 0018-2753 – via Internet Archive.
- Clogg, Richard (2009). "Academics at War: The British School at Athens During the First World War". In Llewellyn Smith, Michael; Kitromilides, Paschalis M.; Calligas, Eleni (eds.). Scholars, Travels, Archives: Greek History and Culture through the British School at Athens. British School at Athens Studies. Vol. 17. London: The British School at Athens. pp. 163–177. ISBN 9780904887600. JSTOR 40960681.
- Droop, John Percival (1926). "Mycenae 1921–1923: Legitimate and Illegitimate Criticism". Annals of Archaeology and Anthropology. 13: 43–48. OCLC 1481368.
- Dunbabin, T. J. (1954). "Obituary: Sir John Myres: 1869–1954". The Annual of the British School at Athens. 49: 311–312. doi:10.1017/S0068245400012818. ISSN 0068-2454. JSTOR 30097000. S2CID 180890291.
- Evans, Arthur (1929). The Shaft Graves and Bee-Hive Tombs of Mycenae and their Inter-Relations. London: Macmillan. doi:10.11588/diglit.7476. OCLC 3565692.
- Freeman, Philip (2007). The Best Training-Ground for Archaeologists: Francis Haverfield and the Invention of Romano-British Archaeology. Oxford: Oxbow. ISBN 9781842172803.
- Galanakis, Yannis (2007). "The Construction of the Aegisthus Tholos Tomb at Mycenae and the 'Helladic Heresy'". The Annual of the British School at Athens. 102: 239–256. doi:10.1017/S0068245400021481. ISSN 0068-2454. JSTOR 30245251. S2CID 162590402.
- George, Walter Sykes (1912) [1910]. The Church of Saint Eirene at Constantinople. London: H. Frowde. OCLC 40622399.
- Gere, Cathy (2006). The Tomb of Agamemnon: Mycenae and the Search for a Hero. London: Profile Books. ISBN 9781861976178.
- Gill, David (2002). "The Passion of Hazard: Women at the British School of Athens Before the First World War". The Annual of the British School at Athens. 97: 491–510. doi:10.1017/S0068245400017482. ISSN 0068-2454. JSTOR 30073198.
- Gill, David (2004). "Wace, Alan John Bayard (1879–1957)". Oxford Dictionary of National Biography (online ed.). Oxford University Press. doi:10.1093/ref:odnb/74552. (Subscription, Wikipedia Library access or UK public library membership required.)
- Gill, David (2011). Sifting the Soil of Greece: The Early Years of the British School at Athens (1886–1919. Bulletin of the Institute of Classical Studies Supplements. Vol. 111. London: Institute of Classical Studies. pp. iii–474. ISBN 9781905670321. JSTOR 44214938.
- Grundon, Imogen (2007). The Rash Adventurer: A Life of John Pendlebury. Faringdon: Libri. ISBN 9781901965063.
- Hood, Rachel (1998). Faces of Archaeology in Greece: Caricatures by Piet de Jong. Oxford: Leopard's Head. ISBN 0904920380.
- Hood, Sinclair (1958). "Alan John Bayard Wace". Gnomon. 30 (2): 158–159. ISSN 0017-1417. JSTOR 27681758.
- Hope Simpson, Richard; Dickinson, O. T. P. K. (1979). A Gazetteer of Aegean Civilisation in the Bronze Age: Vol I: The Mainland and Islands. Studies in Mediterranean Archaeology. Vol. 52. Goteborg: Paul Åströms Förlag. doi:10.2307/629926. JSTOR 629926. OCLC 1333707782. S2CID 162728968.
- Koehl, Robert B. (1990). "A Letter from Evans to Droop on the 'Problem' of Wace". The Classical Journal. 86 (1): 45–52. JSTOR 3297922.
- Lang, Mabel L. (2000). "Faces of Archaeology in Greece: Caricatures by Piet de Jong. By Rachel Hood and Piet de Jong". American Journal of Archaeology. 104 (2): 381. doi:10.2307/507463. ISSN 0002-9114. JSTOR 507463.
- Lord, Louis E. (1947). A History of the American School of Classical Studies at Athens 1882–1942 (PDF). Cambridge: Harvard University Press. OCLC 648555.
- Mackenzie, Compton (1931). First Athenian Memories. London: Cassell and Company. OCLC 557602806.
- Mackridge, Peter (1990). "'Some Pamphlets on Dead Greek Dialects': R. M. Dawkins and Modern Greek Dialectology". The Annual of the British School at Athens. 85: 201–212. doi:10.1017/S0068245400015641. ISSN 0075-4269. JSTOR 30102847.
- Mackridge, Peter (2009). "From Archaeology to Dialectology and Folklore: The Role of the British School at Athens in the Career of R. M. Dawkins". British School at Athens Studies. 17: 49–58. ISSN 2159-4996. JSTOR 40960671.
- McNamara, Robert (2004) [2003]. Britain, Nasser and the Balance of Power in the Middle East, 1952–1977: From The Egyptian Revolution to the Six Day War. London: Frank Cass. ISBN 9781135773038.
- Naylor, Rebecca (2024). "Tales from the Archives No.2. Explosive Wace!". Faculty of Classics, University of Cambridge. Archived from the original on 21 December 2024.
- "Obituary: Frederick Charles Wace M. A." The Eagle. Vol. 17. 1893. pp. 544–546.
- Oliver, Graham (2012). "Reviewed Works: Dawn of Discovery: The Early British Travellers to Crete: Richard Pococke, Robert Pashley and Thomas Spratt, and their Contribution to the Island's Bronze Age Archaeological Heritage (British Archaeological Reports International Series 2053) by D. Moore; Sifting the Soil of Greece: The Early Years of the British School at Athens (1886–1919) (Bulletin of the Institute of Classical Studies Supplement 111) by D. W. J. Gill". The Journal of Hellenic Studies. 132: 303–305. doi:10.1017/S0075426912001218. JSTOR 41722369.
- Papadopoulos, John K. (1993). "The Correspondence of A. J. B. Wace in the Library of the Australian Archaeological Institute at Athens". The Annual of the British School at Athens. 88: 337–352. doi:10.1017/S0068245400016002. ISSN 0075-4269. S2CID 163694465.
- Pendlebury, John (1939). The Archaeology of Crete: An Introduction. London: Methuen. ISBN 9780416725902.
- "Prof. Alan Wace, An Archaeologist, British Expert on Hellenic Art and Folklore Dies at 78 – Noted for Excavations". The New York Times. 11 November 1957. p. 29.
- "Rules and Regulations of the British School at Athens". The Annual of the British School at Athens. 26: 376–380. 1925. ISSN 0075-4269. JSTOR 30096564.
- Shelmerdine, Cynthia (2008). "Introduction: Background, Methods and Sources". In Shelmerdine, Cynthia (ed.). The Cambridge Companion to the Aegean Bronze Age. Cambridge: Cambridge University Press. pp. 1–18. doi:10.1017/CCOL9780521814447. ISBN 9781139001892.
- Sherratt, Susan (2022). "Elizabeth (Lisa) Bayard French (1931–2021)". The Annual of the British School at Athens. 117: 457–463. doi:10.1017/S0068245422000089. ISSN 0075-4269. S2CID 251085986.
- Simpson, Cheryl (2015). "Greek Embroideries: The Early Collectors and Their Ongoing Legacy". In Tsianikas, M.; Couvalis, G.; Palaktsoglou, M. (eds.). Reading, Interpreting, Experiencing: An Inter-Cultural Journey into Greek Letters. Modern Greek Studies Association of New Zealand. pp. 186–198. OL 49809836M – via Academia.edu.
- Sparkes, Brian A. (2006). "Charles Martin Robertson 1911–2004" (PDF). Proceedings of the British Academy. 138: 321–335. ISSN 0068-1202.
- Spawforth, Antony (2020). "'Macedonian Times': Hellenistic Memories in the Provinces of the Roman Near East". In Konstan, David; Saïd, Suzanne (eds.). Greeks on Greekness: Viewing the Greek Past Under the Roman Empire. Cambridge Classical Journal Supplements. Vol. 29. Cambridge: Cambridge Philological Society. pp. 1–26. doi:10.2307/j.ctv27h1pvt.4. S2CID 245967228.
- Stuart Jones, Henry, ed. (1912). A Catalogue of the Ancient Sculptures Preserved in the Municipal Collections of Rome: The Sculptures of the Museo Capitolino. Oxford: Oxford University Press. OCLC 1041809153 – via Internet Archive.
- Stubbings, Frank H. (1958). "Alan John Bayard Wace, 1879–1957" (PDF). Proceedings of the British Academy. 44: 263–280. ISSN 0068-1202.
- Toynbee, Arnold J. (1969). Experiences. Oxford: Oxford University Press. ISBN 9780195001945.
- Travlos, Konstantinos (2020). "Appendix I: Chronology". Salvation and Catastrophe: The Greek–Turkish War 1919–1922. London: Lexington Books. pp. 379–388. ISBN 9781498585088.
- Ucko, Peter J.; Quirke, Stephen (2013). "The Petrie Medal". Public Archaeology. 5: 15–25. doi:10.1179/pua.2006.5.1.15. ISSN 1465-5187. S2CID 144306503.
- Wallace-Hadrill, Andrew (2001). The British School at Rome: One Hundred Years. London: British School at Rome. ISBN 0904152359 – via Internet Archive.
- Waterhouse, Helen (1986). "The British School at Athens: The First Hundred Years". The Annual of the British School at Athens: Supplementary Volumes. 19: 1–170. ISSN 0068-2454. JSTOR 40856005.
- Whitling, Frederick (2019). Western Ways: Foreign Schools in Rome and Athens. Boston: De Gruyter. ISBN 9783110601589.
- Wills, David (2015). "The Salonica Campaign of the First World War from an Archaeologist's Perspective: Alan J. B. Wace's Greece Untrodden (1964)" (PDF). Balkan Studies. 50: 139–157. ISSN 0005-4313. Archived from the original (PDF) on 6 November 2023.

Academic offices
Preceded by Arthur Bernard Cook	Laurence Professor of Classical Archaeology at Cambridge University; 1934 - 1944	Succeeded by Arnold Walter Lawrence
