= Menelaion =

Archaeological site in Laconia, Greece

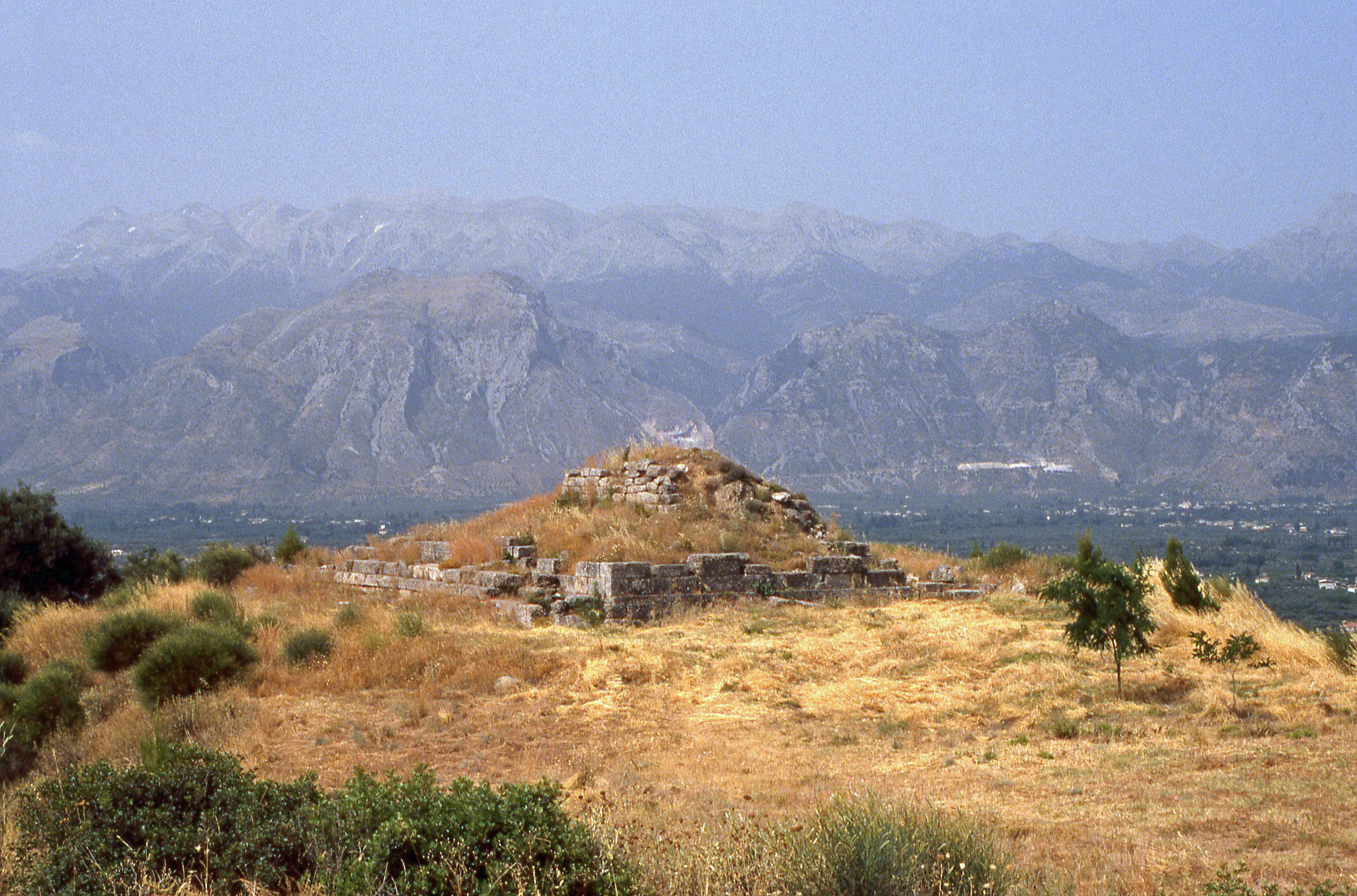
- The Menelaion with Taygetos in the background

- Location within Greece
- 37°3′54″N 22°27′10.8″E
- Type: Sanctuary
- Location: Sparta, Greece
- Region: Laconia

History
- Built: Archaic and Classical hero shrine on site of Late Helladic domestic buildings

Site notes
- Management: Ephorate of Prehistoric and Classical Antiquities of Laconia
- Website: Greek Ministry of Culture

The Menelaion (Ancient Greek: Μενελάειον, romanized: Menelaeion) is an archaeological site in Therapne (Laconia, Greece), located on a ridge approximately 5 km from the modern (and classical) city of Sparta. The archaeological hill complex of Therapne dates from the Bronze Age Mycenaean civilization and comprises four hills: the Northern hill, Menelaion, Profitis Ilias and Aetos.

The archaic name of the place was also Therapne (Ancient Greek: Θεράπνη). When Homer composed the Iliad and described the wealthy kingdom of King Menelaus and Queen Helen, the site he was likely referencing was this Mycenaean complex at Therapne.

== Historical context ==
Fluvial deposits of the valley of Eurotas, mild climate and low hills which protect the area, are forming the general geographical and geological context of the archaeological site which revealed few Middle Helladic findings on the Northern hill and major settlement of the Mycenaean period in the Menelaion.

This "proto-Sparta" was part of the standard Mycenaean culture. Its elites wore gold jewelry, traded extensively across the Mediterranean, and enjoyed a refined lifestyle — the exact opposite of the minimalist, anti-wealth lifestyle Classical Sparta later adopted. When resettling the area after the Bronze Age collapse, the early Spartans did not rebuild on the ridge but established the city of Sparta down in the unfortified valley below.

Around the 8th century BC, the Spartans built a monumental hero-shrine directly over the ruins, naming it Menelaion. They dedicated this shrine to Menelaus and Helen, worshipping them as divine ancestors to legitimize their own political control over the region.

== Excavations ==
=== Ludwig Ross ===
On the hill of Menelaion during the 8th century BCE the eponymous heroes, Menelaus and Helen of Troy, were worshiped, with a possible altar and enclosure. At the end of the 7th and 6th centuries BCE, a temple built with limestone was erected in place. The Menelaeion heroon has been recognized as such by Ludwig Ross. Ross excavated the area in 1834, revealing lead votive figurines of the Laconic type.

=== John Percival Droop, M. S. Thompson, and Alan Wace ===
In 1909 the British School at Athens conducted with John Percival Droop, M. S. Thompson, and Alan Wace the first systematic excavation of the archaeological site. The excavation revealed a Late Mycenaean structure built with raw brick coated with painted plaster on the eastern peak of the ridge of Menelaeion hill. Further excavations followed, led by Richard MacGillivray Dawkins, then director of the British School of Athens, in the year 1910.

=== Hector Catling ===
After 60 years the British School returned to the site and excavations were conducted by Hector Catling. Hector Catling tried to form a chronological sequence between the remnants of the Mycenaean period and the late heroic cult of Menelaos, based on structural changes of the building that Dawkins revealed which divided in three distinct phases:

- Mansion 1 - Original building facing south assembling three parallel units. The central unit is considered a megaron. It was built about 1450 BCE and soon destroyed by possible earthquake.
- Mansion 2 - was built about 10 meters further from Mansion 1, with a new orientation and reported abandoned during Late Helladic period (LHIIIA1)
- Mansion 3 - was inhabited at the end of Late Helladic (LHIIIA1)

Excavations also revealed remains of the Bronze Age in the hills around the Menelaion. In North Hill, north of the ridge of Menelaion, prehistoric settlement has been found in disordered strata, associated with pottery of LH IIIB. On the hill Eagle, south of the ridge of Menelaion, pottery of LH IIB2 has been revealed in a surface stratum. The above-mentioned, in combination with the building design, led Hector Catling to the view that these palaces were administrative centers and ancestors of large megaroid palaces of Pylos, Mycenae and Tiryns.

Catling's excavation revealed a bronze aryballos of the 7th century BCE with an incised boustrophedon inscription, ΔΕΙΝΙΣ ΤΑΔΕ' ΑΝΕΘΕΚΕ ΧΑΡΙ[-] ϜΕΛΕΝΑΙ ΜΕΝΕΛΑϜΟ ("Deinis offered this as a gift to Helen, [wife of] Menelaus"). A bronze instrument object of uncertain use, perhaps a harpax, bears another dedication to Helen, dated to the 6th century BCE: ΤΑΙ ϜΕΛΕΝΑΙ ("To Helen"). The next year Catling discovered, in the bottom of a cistern, a blue limestone stele of the early 5th century BCE, which had once supported a bronze statuette and which bore the inscription ΕΥΘΥΚΡΕΝΕΣ ΑΝΕΘΕΚΕ ΤΟΙ ΜΕΝΕΛΑΙ ("Euthykrenes dedicated [this] to Menelaus). These inscriptions confirmed the identification of the structure, first proposed by Ross, as a heroon dedicated to Menelaus and Helen.

=== Richard Catling ===
Richard Catling (Hector Catling's son) continued excavations in Therapne during the 1980s, on a terrace of the south side of Menelaion hill. His site consisted of disturbed strata filled with sub-geometric and early archaic votive offerings. In the same place have been discovered the walls and the floor of a structure dated to late 13th and 12th century BCE. Since some votive offerings have been associated with the remains of the Mycenaean construction, R. Catling expressed the view that they were votive offerings to the hero or heroine of the Bronze Age.

== Stratigraphy ==
As monument, Menelaion presents different stratigraphic and architectural phases:

The first phase, probably late 8th or early 7th century BC, is not linked to a specific architectural edifice, but scattered limestone blocks. Blocks' relative dating depends on their correlation with strata in which relevant votive offerings were uncovered.

During the second phase, probably in the sixth century BC it seems that a small monumental structure has been built made of limestone. Building materials have been found out of archaeological context, either in landfills or preserved in late structure. This Ancient Menelaion survived until the fifth century BC when it was demolished to be replaced with a structure, whose ruins are visible to this day.

The third, classical, phase is connected with the 5th century BC and stratigraphy indicates that the new sanctuary was built upon the ancient edifice, although some researchers believe that Ancient Menelaion was actually recognized as a warehouse during the excavations of 1909.

== See also ==
- Helladic chronology
- Agios Vasileios, Laconia
