= Marcus Niebuhr Tod =

British historian and epigrapher (1878–1974)

Marcus Niebuhr Tod OBE FBA
- Portrait by Walter Stoneman, 1947
- Born: 24 November 1878; London, England
- Died: 21 February 1974 (aged 95)

Academic background
- Education: St John's College, Oxford; British School at Athens

Academic work
- Institutions: Oriel College, Oxford

Marcus Niebuhr Tod OBE FBA (24 November 1878 – 21 February 1974) was a British historian and epigraphist. He was a fellow of Oriel College, Oxford, from 1903 to 1947, and Reader in Greek Epigraphy at the University of Oxford from 1927 to 1947.

== Early life, education and the British School at Athens ==
Born in Highgate on 24 November 1878, Tod's father was a Scottish tea merchant; his mother was the daughter of the Prussian courtier Marcus von Niebuhr, and the granddaughter of the German-Danish historian Barthold Georg Niebuhr. Tod was educated at St John's College, Oxford, as a scholar, taking a first-class BA in classics in 1901.

After graduating, Tod spent four years as a senior student at the British School at Athens, supported by a Craven scholarship from the University of Oxford and a further scholarship from his old college. In 1902, he was appointed assistant director and librarian of the School and accompanied the director Robert Carr Bosanquet on excavations from 1903.

== Academic career and research ==
Tod was elected to a fellowship at Oriel College, Oxford, in 1903 and took up teaching when his studentships ended in 1905. From 1907, he lectured on Greek epigraphy in the university and was promoted to a readership twenty years later. During the First World War, he worked for the Ministry of Labour and then for most of the period between 1915 and early 1919 in Salonika as an interpreter and officer in the Intelligence Corps (being appointed an Officer of the Order of the British Empire for his service). Tod returned to teaching (which he enjoyed) and between 1934 and 1945 he was vice-provost at Oriel College.

While at the British School in Athens, Tod became interested in Spartan epigraphy, and also carried out investigations in Laconia. These led to several articles on the topics and he worked with Alan Wace to produce a catalogue of the Spartan Museum in 1906. In 1912, he won the Conington Prize at Oxford for his essay "Greek International Arbitration" which was published in 1913. He wrote a chapter for the fifth volume of The Cambridge Ancient History (1927) and three of his lectures delivered at University College London were published as Sidelights on Greek History (1933). In 1933 and 1948, he published a two-volume work, Greek Historical Inscriptions.

Tod retired from his fellowship and readership at Oxford in 1947, but was elected to honorary fellowships at St John's and Oriel. He was also an honorary member of staff at the University of Birmingham. He received honorary doctorates from Trinity College Dublin, the University of Edinburgh, the University of Birmingham and the University of Oxford. He was elected a Fellow of the British Academy in 1929. He died on 21 February 1974.
