= A. M. Woodward =

British archeologist and historian

Arthur Maurice Woodward FSA (29 June 1883 – 12 November 1973) was a British archaeologist and ancient historian who was director of the British School at Athens from 1923 to 1929. He was later head of the department of ancient history at the University of Sheffield. During the First World War he served with the British Army in the British Salonika Force and was mentioned in despatches.

== Early life ==
Arthur Maurice Woodward was born in Everton, Liverpool, on 29 June 1883, the son of the Reverend William Harris Woodward. His mother was Katherine Mary Woodward. He was educated at Shrewsbury School and Magdalen College, University of Oxford.

== Career ==
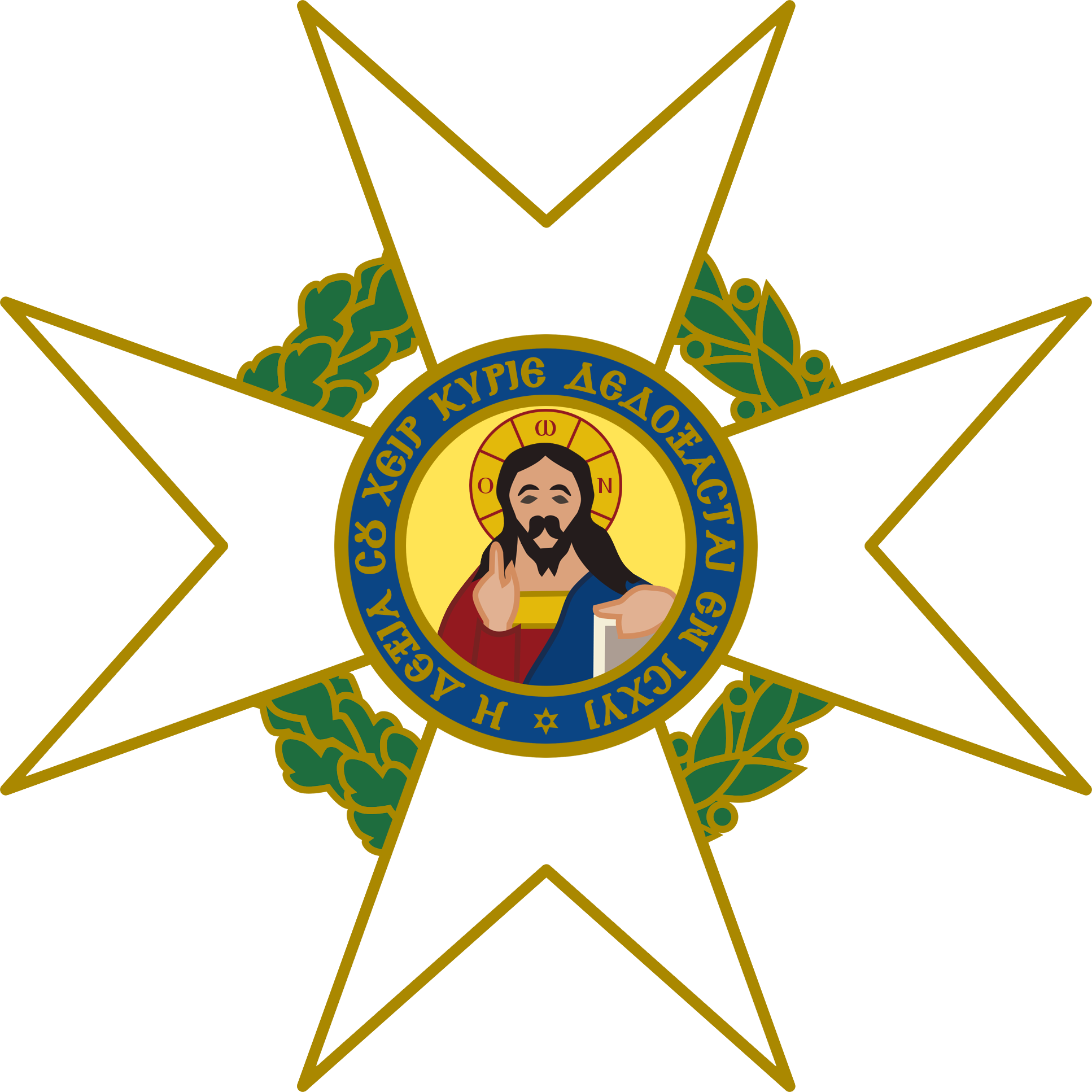
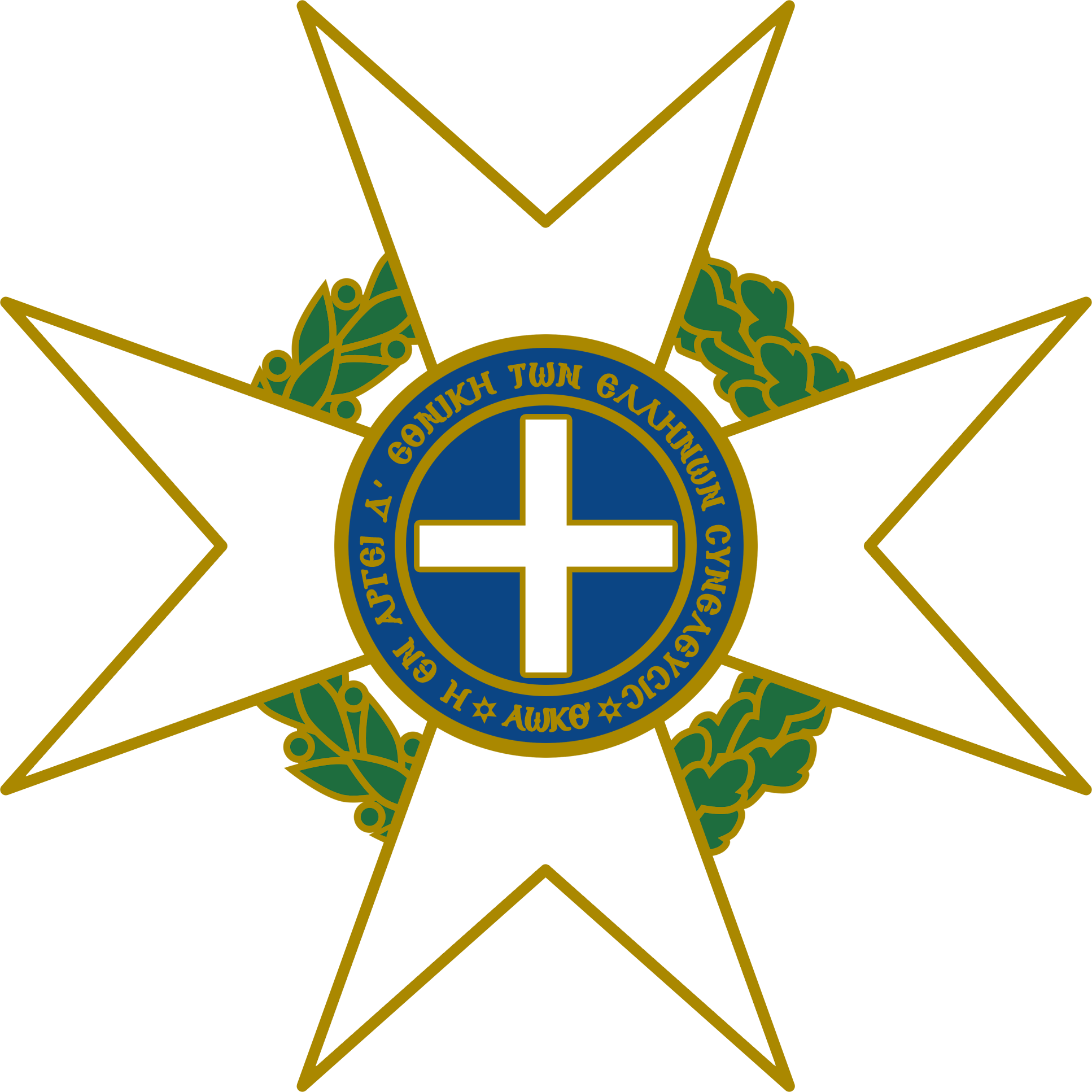
Badge of the Order of the Redeemer, obverse on the left and reverse on the right. Under the monarchy, a royal crown surmounted the cross.

In 1908, Woodward was appointed to a studentship at the British School at Athens. He was assistant director in 1909-10 and 1922–23 and director from 1923 to 1929. He was an assistant lecturer at the University of Liverpool, 1911–12, and at Leeds in 1912–22. He was later a lecturer then reader in ancient history and archaeology and subsequently head of the department of ancient history at the University of Sheffield, 1945–47.

During the First World War, Woodward served in the British Army in Macedonia and Bulgaria with the British Salonika Force (November 1915 to January 1919). He was mentioned in despatches twice. In 1924 he was awarded the Greek Order of the Redeemer (class unknown).

Among Woodward's writings were articles for The Numismatic Chronicle (he was a keen student of numismatics), numerous articles for the proceedings of the British School at Athens, articles for the Yorkshire Archaeological Society and, later, entries for The Oxford Classical Dictionary under the initials "AMW".

== Marriage ==
In 1925, Woodward married Jocelyn Mary Pybus (died 12 November 1973) second daughter of John Pybus. Jocelyn was a student at the British School at Athens in 1922–23.

== Death ==
Woodward died, at the age of 90, on 12 November 1973.

== Selected publications ==
- The Roman Fort at Ilkley. Yorkshire Archaeological Society, Huddersfield, 1925.
- Excavations at Slack, 1913-1915. (With P.W. Dodd) (Reprinted from The Yorkshire Archaeological Journal, Vol. 26.)
- The Coinage of Pertinax. The University Press, Oxford, 1957. (Reprinted from The Numismatic Chronicle, 6th series, Vol. 17, 1957.)
