= Emil Kunze =

German classical archaeologist

Emil Kunze (18 December 1901, in Dresden – 13 January 1994) was a German classical archaeologist, and a corresponding member of the Göttingen Academy of Sciences and Humanities from 1951. The director of the German Archaeological Institute, he resumed excavations at Olympia, Greece after the Second World War.
