= Arthur Bernard Cook =

British classical scholar (1868–1952)

Arthur Bernard Cook FBA
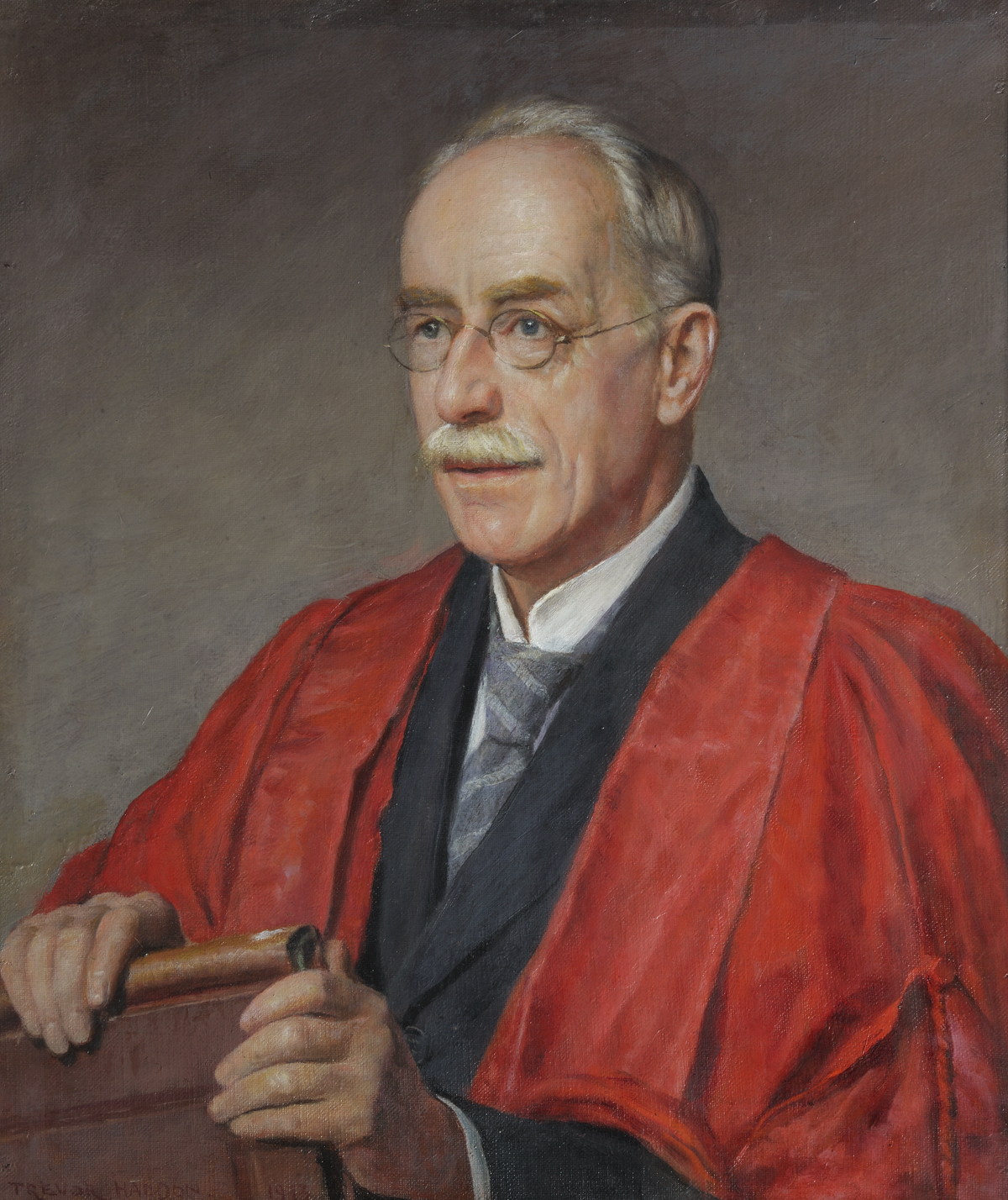
- Portrait by Arthur Trevor Haddon, 1933
- Born: 22 October 1868; Hampstead, England
- Died: 26 April 1952 (aged 83); Cambridge, England
- Awards: Fellow, British Academy, 1941

Academic background
- Education: St. Paul's School, London
- Alma mater: Trinity College, Cambridge (MA)

Academic work
- Discipline: Classical archaeologist
- Sub-discipline: Art Historian, University teacher
- Institutions: Bedford College, London; University of Cambridge
- Notable works: Zeus: A Study in Ancient Religion.

Arthur Bernard Cook FBA (22 October 1868 – 26 April 1952) was a British archeologist and classical scholar, best known for his three-part work, Zeus: A Study in Ancient Religion (1914–1940).

== Early life and education ==
Arthur Bernard Cook was born in Hampstead, London on 22 October 1868. He was the son of William Henry Cook MD (1825–1882) and Harriet Bickersteth (1830–1918) His mother's family were leading ecclesiastical scholars of the time, including Edward Bickersteth (Dean of Lichfield) (1814–1892), Edward Bickersteth (bishop of Exeter) (1825–1906) and Edward Bickersteth (bishop of South Tokyo) (1850–1897).

Cook was educated at St. Paul's School, where he won several academic prizes. He received an M.A. from the Trinity College, Cambridge. The Chancellor's Gold Medal is a distinguished annual award at Cambridge University for poetry, paralleling Oxford University's Newdigate prize. Cook's poem Windsor Castle won the Chancellor's Gold Medal for poetry at Cambridge in 1889. In 1893, he was awarded a fellowship at Trinity College.

== Career ==
From 1892–1907, Cook was professor of Greek at Bedford College, London. In 1900, he became Fellow of Queens' College, Cambridge. From 1907 to 1931 he was Reader of Classical Archaeology at University of Cambridge. He became the Laurence Professor of Classical Archaeology at Cambridge in 1931, where he had held the position as Reader, until 1934. From 1935 to 1952, Cook was Vice-President of Queens' College. Cook was elected as a fellow of the British Academy for the humanities and social sciences in 1941. He was elected an International Member of the American Philosophical Society in 1944. Professor Cook died in Cambridge on 26 April 1952.

== Legacy ==
Cook is often considered one of the Cambridge Ritualists, and although he did not produce theoretical works, he has been called "perhaps the most typical disciple" of J. G. Frazer.

== Works ==
- The Metaphysical Basis of Plato's Ethics (1895)
- Zeus. A Study In Ancient Religion (1914–1940)
  - Volume 1: Zeus, God of the Bright Sky, Biblo-Moser (1964), ISBN 0-8196-0148-9 (reprint)
  - Volume 2: Zeus, God of the Dark Sky (Thunder and Lightning), Biblo-Moser, (1964), ISBN 0-8196-0156-X
  - Volume 3: Zeus, God of the Dark Sky (Earthquakes, Clouds, Wind, Dew, Rain, Meteorites)
