= John Percival Droop =

British classical archaeologist (1882–1963)

- Droop (standing), photographed at the BSA excavations at Sparta in 1908
- Born: 4 October 1882; Kensington, London
- Died: 26 September 1963 (aged 80); Vence, France
- Known for: Naming and defining the Droop Cup
- Spouse: Ida Bride Moloney (m. 1916)

Academic background
- Education: Trinity College, Cambridge

Academic work
- Discipline: Archaeology
- Sub-discipline: Classical Archaeology
- Institutions: University of Liverpool

John Percival Droop (4 October 1882 – 26 September 1963, in Vence, France) was a British classical archaeologist of Dutch descent.

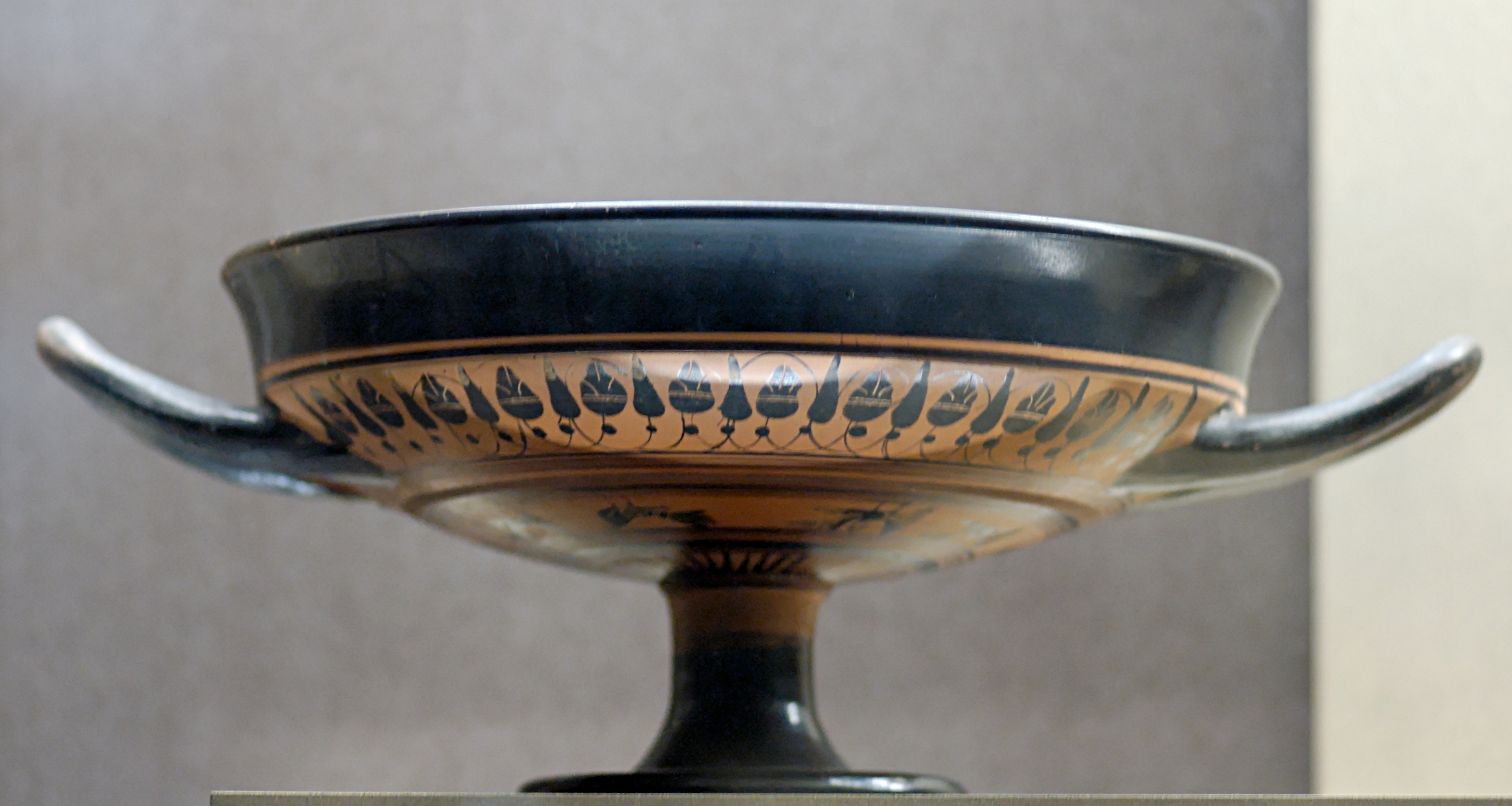
A 'Droop Cup', named after Droop — characterised by its concave, black lips, clearly distinguished from the lower body; its high feet with an unglazed ridge at the top and bottom, the black slip on the edge of the base, the interior of the foot and in a thick circle on the interior of the bowl.

After attending Marlborough College and Trinity College, Cambridge, Droop became a student of the British School at Athens, where he excavated at Sparta, in Thessaly, on Milos and on Crete. He later became a full member of the BSA.

In 1911, Droop joined T. Eric Peet's Egypt Exploration Fund at Abydos, where he and Peet developed a system for dating pre-dynastic Egyptian ceramics. During the First World War, Droop worked for the Admiralty, and remained in post until 1921, when he was appointed the Charles W. Jones Professor of Classical Archaeology in the University of Liverpool, a position he held until 1948.

He excavated widely: at Chester, Bainbridge and Lancaster in Britain, and at Niebla in Spain. He edited the scholarly journal Annals of Archaeology and Anthropology from 1937 until 1948.

Droop gives his name to an Ancient Greek bowl form, dating from the 6th century BC, which he studied and categorised. Droop also researched the temple of Artemis Orthia at Sparta.

He was the son of Henry Richmond Droop (1832–1884), the mathematician, and Clara Baily (c. 1841 – 7 September 1921). In 1916, he married Ita Bride Moloney; they had three children.

== Works ==
- 1908. "Two Cyrenaic Kylikes", Journal of Hellenic Studies 28:175–179.
- 1910. "The dates of the vases called 'Cyrenaic", Journal of Hellenic Studies 30:1–34.
- 1932. "Droop Cups and the Dating of Laconian Pottery", Journal of Hellenic Studies 52:303–304.

== Sources ==
- Simmonds, Kim (2019). "John Percival Droop". Archived from the original on 3 January 2023.
- Snodgrass, Anthony M. (2006). Archaeology and the Emergence of Greece. Cornell University Press. ISBN 978-0-8014-7354-8.
- Sorensen, Lee (2018). "Droop, J. P." Dictionary of Art Historians. Archived from the original on 3 January 2023.
