= Lippold =

Lippold is a name. Notable people with the name include:

- Georg Lippold (1885–1954), German archaeologist
- Kirk Lippold (born 1959), United States Navy officers
- Richard Lippold (1915–2002), American sculptor
- Lippold ben Chluchim (1530–1573), Court Jew

== See also ==
- Ad Astra (Lippold sculpture), is a public artwork by Richard Lippold
- Lippoldswilen, is a village and former municipality in the canton of Thurgau, Switzerland
