= Georg Lippold =

German classical archaeologist

Georg Lippold (21 February 1885 – 23 July 1954) was a German classical archaeologist born in Mainz. Lippold was a specialist of ancient Greek and Roman art.

He studied at the Friedrich Wilhelm University of Berlin and the Ludwig-Maximilians-Universität München. He was one of the last students of Adolf Furtwängler (1852–1907), who was an important influence to Lippold's career. Following graduation, he worked at the Romano-Germanic Central Museum in Mainz, and in 1910–11 at the Martin von Wagner Museum in Würzburg. In 1920, he relocated to the University of Erlangen as a lecturer, where he later served as a full professor of archaeology (1925-1953).

Lippold succeeded Walther Amelung (1865–1927) as cataloguer of sculptures at the Vatican, publishing in 1936, Die Skulpturen des Vatikanischen Museums. His second volume involving Vatican sculpture was published posthumously in 1956.

After the death of archaeologist Paul Arndt in 1937, he took over editorship of Denkmäler griechischer und römischer Sculptur ("Greek and Roman Sculpture"), as well as Griechische und römische Porträts ("Greek and Roman Portraits"). In 1923, he published "Kopien und Umbildungen griechischer Statuen", a comprehensive examination on the "copy system" of ancient Greek statues.

Despite his outspoken opposition to Hitler and National Socialism, Lippold retained his professorship at the University of Erlangen.

== Selected publications ==
- Griechische Porträtstatuen, (Greek portrait statues), Munich 1912.
- Kopien und Umbildungen griechischer Statuen (Copies and transformations of Greek statues), Munich 1923.
- Griechische Plastik, Handbuch der Archäologie (Greek sculpture, Textbook of archaeology), Munich 1950.
