= Furtwängler =

Furtwängler is a German surname, originally meaning a person from Furtwangen. Notable people with the surname include:

- Adolf Furtwängler (1853–1907), archaeologist and art historian
- Andreas Furtwängler (born 1944), archaeologist
- Maria Furtwängler (born 1966), physician and actress
- Philipp Furtwängler (1800–1867), organ builder
- Philipp Furtwängler (1869–1940), mathematician
- Wilhelm Furtwängler (1886–1954), conductor and composer

== Also ==
- The Furtwängler Glacier, named for Walter Furtwängler
