= Dancer of Pergamon =

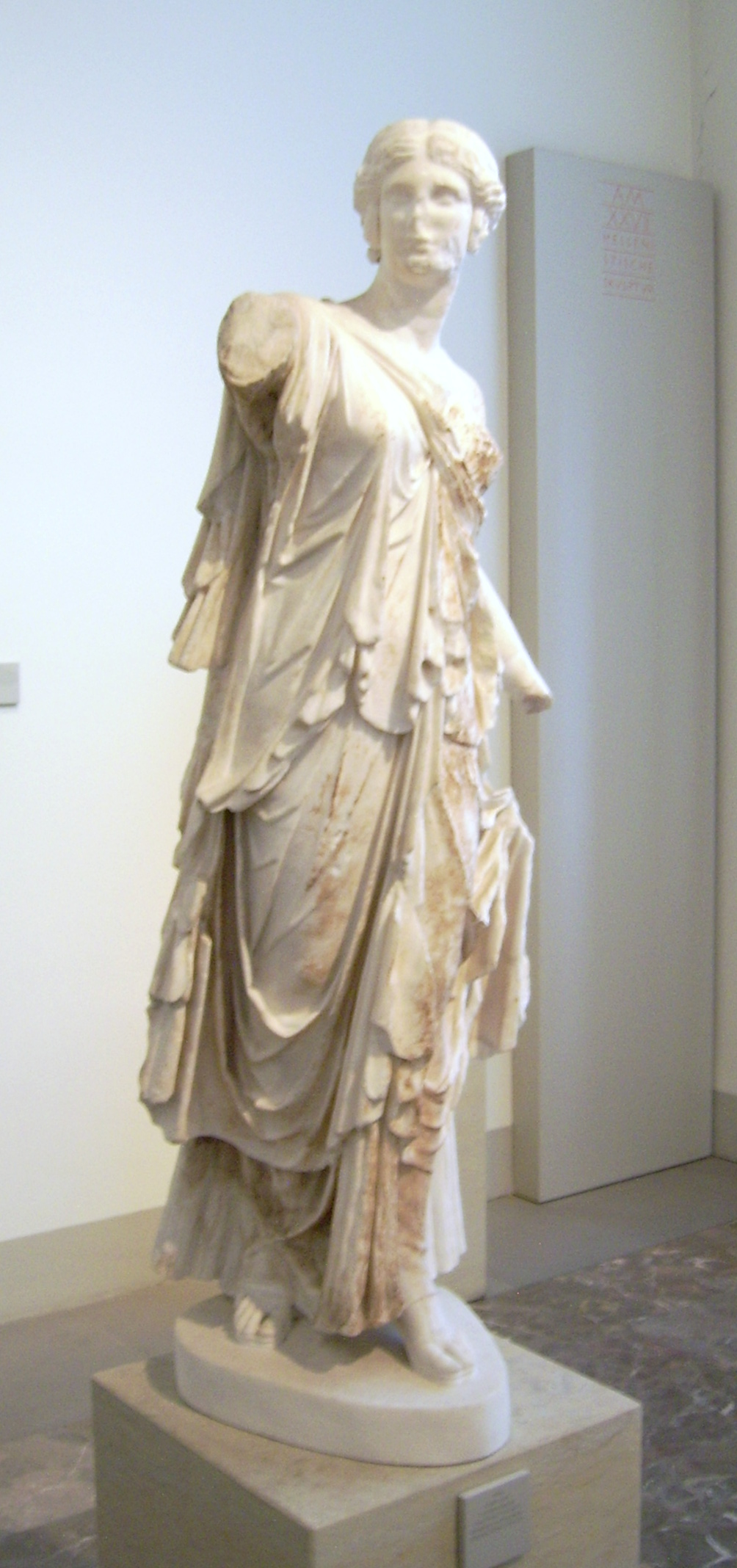
The Dancer of Pergamon as displayed at the Pergamon Museum until 2010

Dancer of Pergamon is the modern name for a Hellenistic statue of a woman from Pergamon, which is now kept at the Antikensammlung Berlin.

The Dancer was found in March 1886 during the German excavations of Pergamon in one of the two dining rooms of Palace V (the notes on the find location in the excavation diary speak for the dining room with the Hephaestion mosaic). From there it was accessioned to the Berlin Antikensammlung (inventory number AvP VII 43), where it formed part of the Pergamonmuseum until 2010. In 2011/12 it formed part of the special exhibition "Pergamon: Panorama of the Ancient Metropole."

== Description ==
The statue of white translucent marble is 120 cm high (114 cm excluding the base), and the head is 14.5 m high. It depicts a young woman, with her left leg forward, giving the impression that she is moving forward. Her right hand is raised. It was made from a separate piece of stone and has not survived. Her left hand reaches downwards, lightly gripping her dress. The hand and part of the lower arm are not preserved; nor are the statue base and the feet, which have been replaced by a modern creation made of imitation marble. The clothes and face are partially damaged; her nose and many pieces of her dress are missing. The maiden wears several thin layers of fabric which hug her body closely in some parts and forming deep folds of drapery in others. The lowest layer is a sleeved chiton with very fine folds, over which she wears another, armless garment. The fine, rippling fabric is framed at the neck and shoulders by a broad border. The outermost layer is a voluminous cloak, which falls in broad, deep folds. It hangs from her right shoulder, leaving her left shoulder and left breast free and recalls in its shape the cloaks worn by archaic Kore statues of the 6th century BC. The clothing enhances the dynamism of the statue rather than concealing it. The creator of the statue played with various oppositions, as with the broad-spread posture on the one hand and the torsion of the upper body on the other. Similarly, the measured forms of archaic sculpture, with its stitched folds and closely aligned pieces of fabric on the legs, contrast with the lavish cloak flowing out behind her - an entirely different form of materiality. This use of oppositions is also seen in the head and face. Thus, the face is shown with blooming cheeks, deep-set eyes, a small, full mouth, as well as long wavy hair, held back by a band on the forehead and temples. These features are answered by rigid spiral locks of hair on the neck and in front of the ears, which are carved in an archaic style.

== Context ==
On stylistic grounds, the statue is dated to the period between 150 and 125 BC. The statue is an example of the luxurious furnishings of the Pergamene palace. The archaic stylistic features are intentional and recall the grace, "charis" of those depictions. In addition it was common at this time to use archaising forms in the Dionysiac realm (and the statue's presence in a dining room suggests a dionysiac context). As a result of the statue's lack of attributes, however, the statue's purpose can only be guessed at. Heinrich Bulle believed that it was a torchbearer and originally held a torch in the raised right arm, based on similarities with the torchbearer from the Mahdia shipwreck and torchbearer from the Villa Boscoreale. This view has been regularly affirmed, although there are no parallels among the other surviving archaising statues. The statue was probably damaged in Antiquity, either by war damage or an earthquake. As a result, there are some odd aspects of its current shape. Thus, the hair on the neck is short on the left, visible side, but on the right side it has the long, typologically correct spiral locks. It is assumed that the left side reached its current form as a result of reworking in ancient times.

== Bibliography ==
- Christiane Vorster: "Die „Tänzerin“ aus Palast V in Pergamon." in Ralf Grüßinger, Volker Kästner, Andreas Scholl (ed.): Pergamon. Panorama der antiken Metropole. Begleitbuch zur Ausstellung. Michael Imhof Verlag, Petersberg 2011, ISBN 978-3-86568-693-0, pp. 148–151 and pp. 508–509 (Catalogue).
