= Wilhelm Brückner-Rüggeberg =

German conductor (1906–1985)

Wilhelm Brückner-Rüggeberg (15 April 1906, in Stuttgart – 1 April 1985, in Hamburg) was a German conductor.

== Career ==
He began his career in Munich as an assistant to Hans Knappertsbusch at the Bavarian State Opera. After several appointments in Essen, Dortmund, and Kiel, in 1934 he succeeded Herbert von Karajan as first Kapellmeister in Ulm. In 1937, he conducted a complete Beethoven cycle at the invitation of Furtwängler. In 1938, he became director of the Hamburg Lehrergesangsverein and received an appointment at the Hamburg State Opera. In Hamburg, he conducted over 700 concerts for schoolchildren. He frequently worked with the Hamburger Symphoniker and the NDR Elbphilharmonie Orchestra.

In 1943, he started teaching conducting at the Hochschule für Musik und Theater Hamburg where he was promoted to a full professorship in 1955. His grave is located in the Hamburg Waldfriedhof.

== Reputation ==
He was known for his championing the works of Handel and he was considered an exceptional oratorio conductor. He also frequently appeared as a guest conductor in South America, conducting the first South American performance of Beethoven's Missa Solemnis in Rio de Janeiro in 1969. Today, he is mainly known as the conductor of several commercial recordings of German operettas by Kurt Weill issued from 1956 to 1960 featuring Lotte Lenya.
