= Heinrich Bulle =

German archaeologist

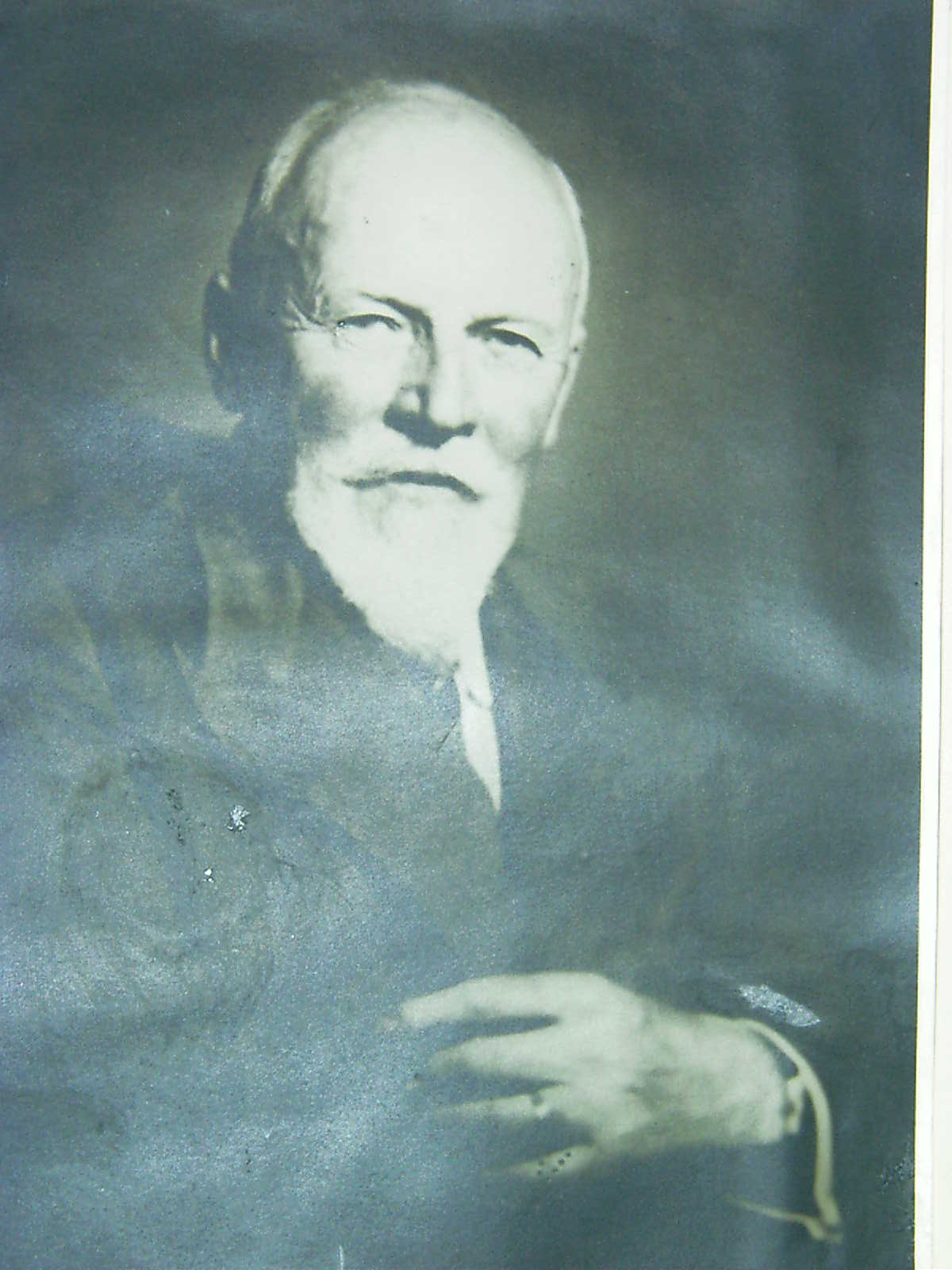
Heinrich Bulle.

Heinrich Bulle (11 December 1867 – 6 April 1945) was a German archaeologist born in Bremen.

He studied classical archaeology at the University of Freiburg, and the Ludwig-Maximilians-Universität München, where he was a student of Heinrich Brunn (1822–1894). From 1898 to 1902, he was a lecturer at the University of Würzburg, followed by an associate professorship at the University of Erlangen. In 1908, he returned to Würzburg as a professor, where he was also director of the "Martin von Wagner Museum". Bulle was a member of the Bavarian Academy of Sciences and Humanities.

Due to the massive destruction of Würzburg in March 1945, Bulle lost all of his books and manuscripts. He died shortly afterwards in Bad Kohlgrub.

Heinrich Bulle was a specialist of ancient Greek art and sculpture. His best known written work was an innovative study of ancient art titled Der schöne Mensch im Altertum, a book that was published over three editions. He also conducted research into ancient Greek theatre.

In 1903–1905, with Adolf Furtwängler (1853–1907), he conducted an important excavation at Orchomenus, Boeotia.

== Selected written works ==
- Der schöne Mensch im Altertum, Eine Geschichte des Körperideals bei Ägyptern, Orientalen, Griechen (The beautiful man in antiquity, History of the ideal body of Egyptians, Orientals and Greeks), 1898.
- Die samische Gruppe des Myron (The Sami group of Myron), Festschrift Paul Arndt, (1925) 62 ff.)
- Der Ostgiebel des Zeustempels zu Olympia (East gables of the Temple of Zeus at Olympia), in: Jahrbuch des Deutschen Archäologischen Instituts 54 (1939). 137 ff.
- Untersuchungen an griechischen Theatern, (Studies of Greek theatres), (1928).
- Das Theater zu Sparta, (Theatre at Sparta), (1934).
- Skenographie, (Scenography), (1934).
- Zum Pothos des Skopas, (About the Pothos sculpture of Skopas), in: Jahrbuch des Deutschen Archäologischen Instituts, (1941).
