= Berlin Foundry Cup =

5th century BC Greek drinking cup

Coordinates: 52.519°N 13.398°E

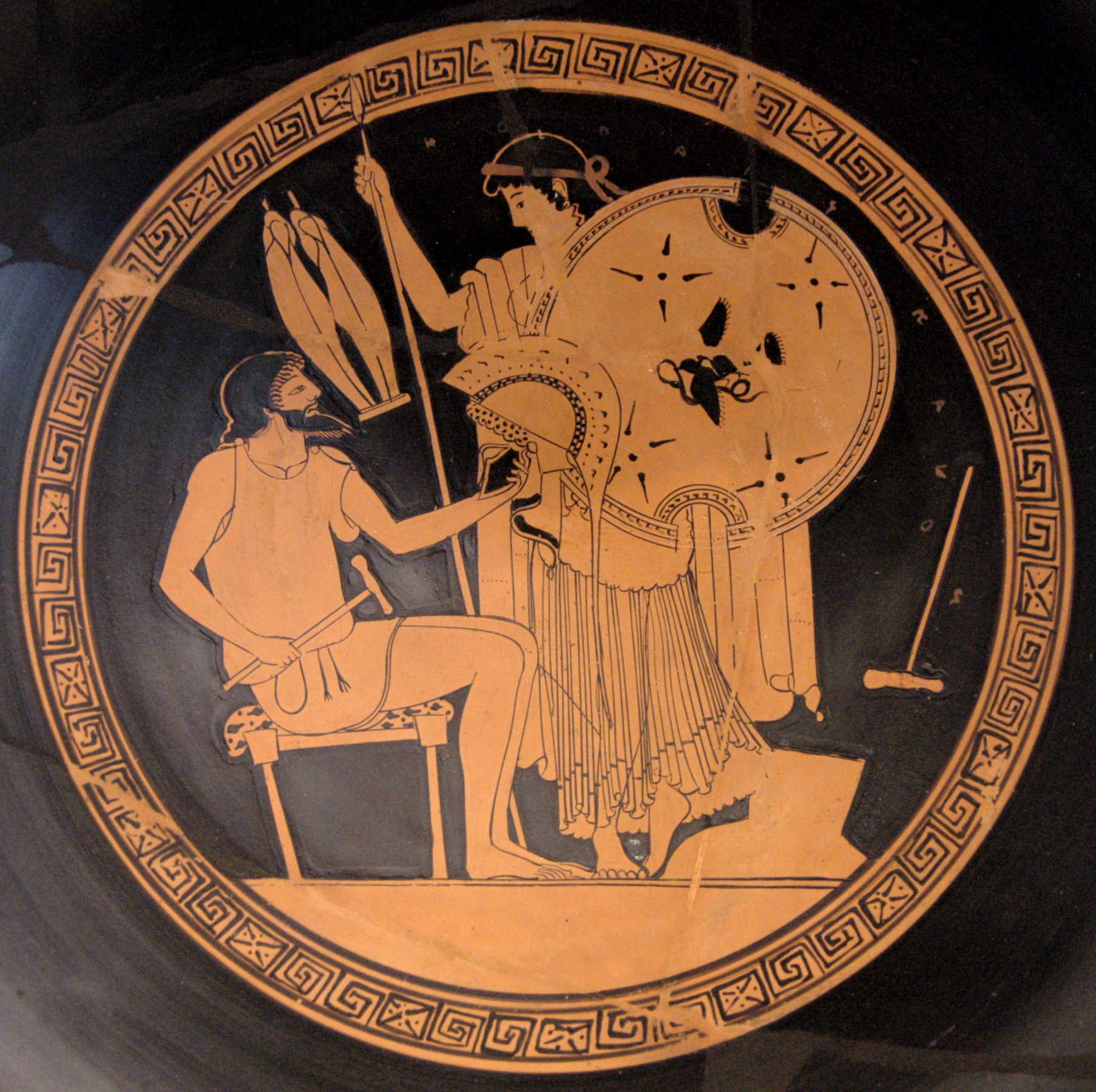
Detail of the tondo

The Berlin Foundry Cup (German: Erzgießerei-Schale) is a red-figure kylix (drinking cup) from the early 5th century BC. It is the name vase of the Attic vase painter known conventionally as the Foundry Painter. Its most striking feature is the exterior depiction of activities in an Athenian bronze workshop or foundry. It is an important source on ancient Greek metal-working technology.

== The cup ==
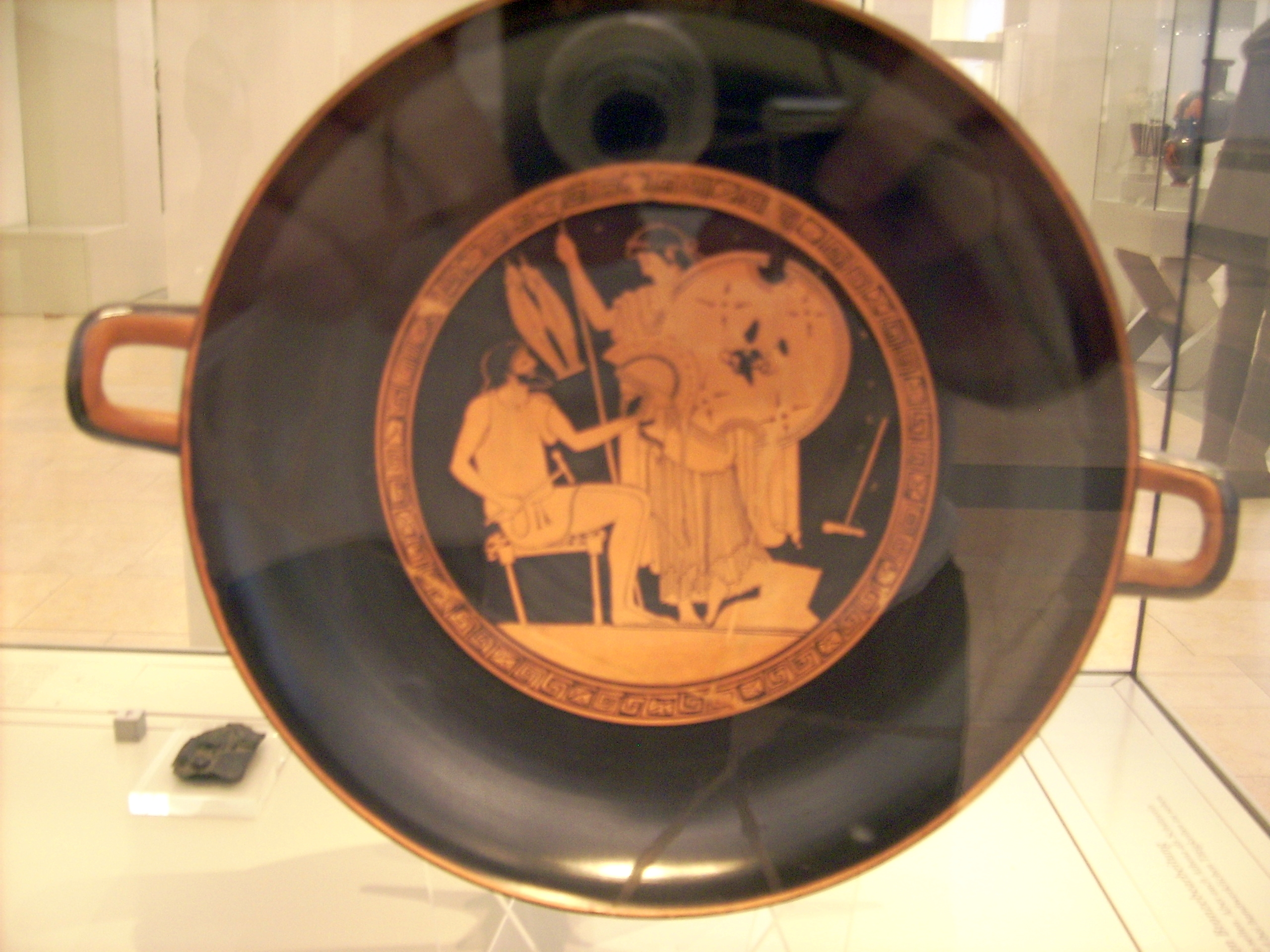
Interior of the cup

The interior image (or tondo) of the cup has a direct connection with metalwork. It depicts Hephaestus, the god of crafts, including smiths, handing the goddess Thetis armour and weaponry for her son Achilles, who is fighting in the Trojan War. Achilles is going to use them to avenge his slain friend Patroclus. The scene is described in Homer's Iliad. Like other scenes connected with the Trojan War, it is a common motif on Greek vases.

In contrast, the exterior image is unusual. It depicts a bronze workshop. The production of a variety of bronze statues is shown at different stages. At the centre of one side (side A), the statue of a warrior, larger than life-sized, stands within a wooden scaffolding. His body his protected by a circular shield held in his left hand; his right hand is about to thrust a raised spear. Unusually, the cheek-guards of the helmet are folded upwards; the painter probably used this to depict the statue's face more clearly. The statue appears to be in the final stages of production, since two workers, one of them marked as a smith by his characteristic leather cap, are smoothing or polishing its surface. They are flanked on each side by a man leaning on a crook and watching the workmen. They appear to neither represent additional workmen, nor the owners of the workshop, but rather random passers-by on the way to or from the palaistra. They were probably going to (or just did) engage in athletic activity, as indicated by the sports-related items (an oil flask and a strigil) suspended behind them.

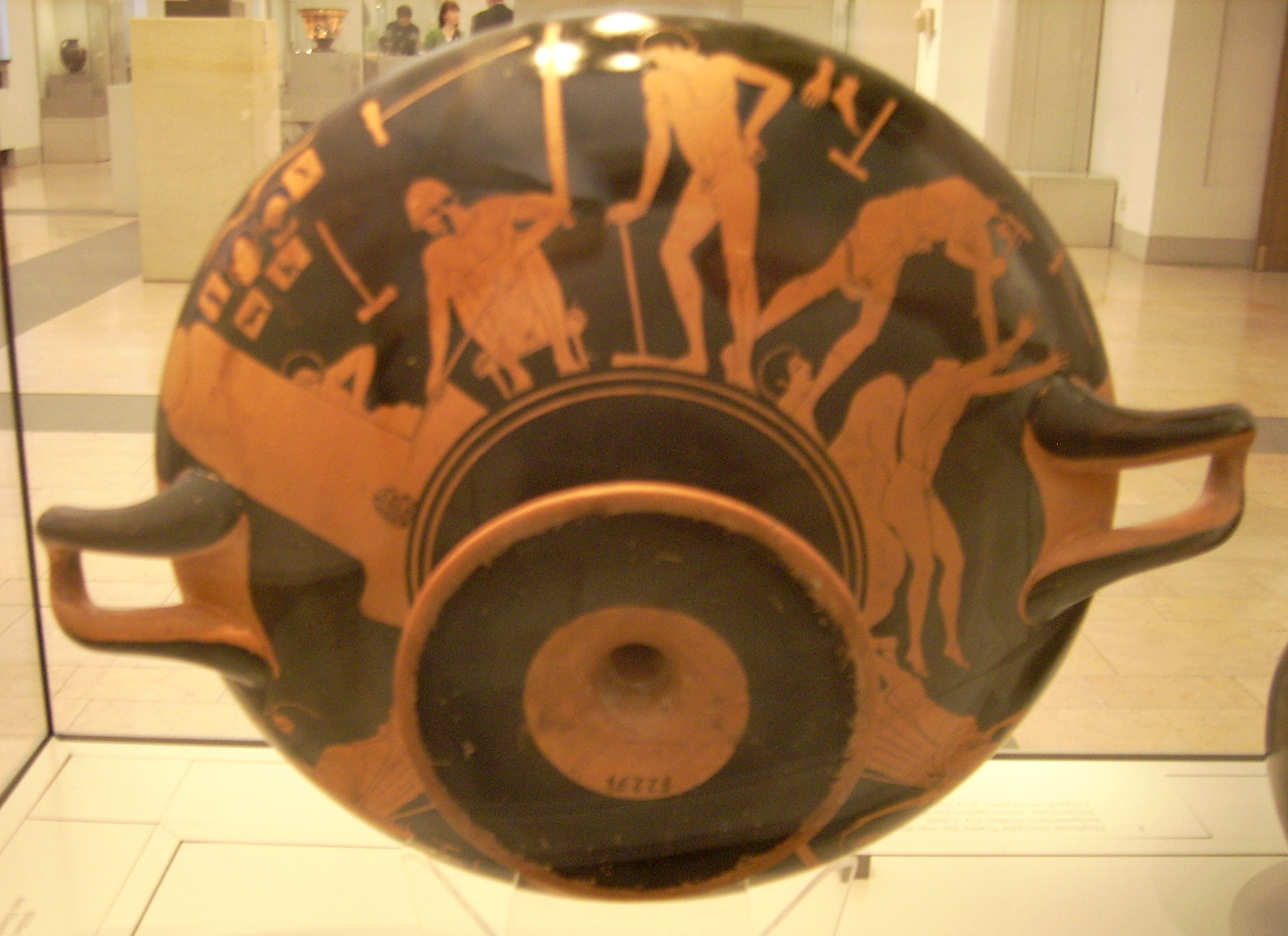
Exterior image, side B with furnace and assembly of athlete's statue

On the opposite side (side B), a second statue is being made. It appears to be that of an athlete. The statue, still headless, is lying on a sand or clay support; a workman is holding one of its arms, carefully manipulating it with a hammer. The statue's head lies at his feet. A line between the statue's arm and hand indicates that the two parts are not fully joined yet. The soldering to join them (in reality it would have been an alloy of lead, antimony and tin with a low melting point) is probably being prepared in the furnace. Behind the furnace, a youth is manipulating a bellows to kindle the fire; in front of it, a seated workman appears to be heating a metal rod.

Metal workshops existed in the Athenian potters' quarter, the Kerameikos. Thus, it is likely that the Foundry Painter's depiction of the workshop is based on personal observation. Some details, such as the furnace, are, however, depicted in a way that differs from the known archaeological evidence. This is probably simply because certain adjustments of reality were necessary to effectively paint or compose the scene. At least some of the depicted workmen appear to be slaves. For example, the man in front of the oven is crouched in such a way that his genitals are visible, a style of depiction normally limited to satyrs and slaves.

There are three kalos inscriptions on the vase: On the interior O PAIS KALOS (the boy is beautiful), on exterior side A DIOGENES KALOS NAICHI (Diogenes is beautiful, too) and on exterior side B O PAIS KALOS NAICHI (this boy is beautiful, too). Apart from a few damaged areas on the interior figure of Thetis, the vase is in an excellent state of preservation. It is Late Archaic in style, and dates to circa 490/480 BC. Its diameter is 30.5 cm. Originally, such cups were used at the symposium. The Foundry cup had been exported to Etruria and was discovered in Vulci, probably in a grave. In 1837 it was acquired for the Antikensammlung at Berlin, Germany. Currently, it is on display in section 15 ("Die Götter Griechenlands" - "The Gods of Greece") of the Altes Museum.

== See also ==
- Bronze sculpture
- Lost-wax casting

== Bibliography ==
- Gerhard Zimmer: Trinkschale. Namensgebendes Werk des Erzgießerei-Malers, in: Andreas Scholl (ed.): Die Antikensammlung: Altes Museum. Pergamonmuseum, von Zabern, Mainz 2007, p. 68f., ISBN 978-3-8053-2449-6
- Gerhard Zimmer: Antike Werkstattbilder, Mann, Berlin 1982 (Bilderheft der Staatlichen Museen Preussischer Kulturbesitz, Heft 42) ISBN 3-7861-1381-5
