= Walther Amelung =

German archaeologist (1865–1927)

Walther Oskar Ernst Amelung (15 October 1865 – 12 September 1927) was a German classical archaeologist who was a native of Stettin. Amelung specialized in investigations of ancient Greek and Roman sculpture.

Starting in 1884, he studied at the University of Tübingen under Erwin Rohde (1845–98), and afterwards at Leipzig University with Johannes Overbeck (1825–1895) and at the Ludwig-Maximilians-Universität München under Heinrich Brunn (1822–1894). From 1891 to 1893, he performed research of ancient sculpture during journeys throughout the Mediterranean region. In 1895 he began work with the German Archaeological Institute (DAI) in Rome, where one of his duties was to catalog the sculpture collection of the Vatican.

During World War I, Amelung was tasked with restoration of plaster casts of classical sculptures in the museum at the Friedrich Wilhelm University of Berlin, and after the war was in charge of reconstruction of the DAI's library in Rome. With art dealer Paul Arndt (1865–1937), he was co-editor of Photographische Einzelaufnahmen antiker Skulpturen, which was a survey of Greek and Roman sculpture. He died on 12 September 1927 in Bad Nauheim.

== Bibliography ==
- Dictionary of Art Historians (biography)
