= Cyclopean Tomb =

Bronze Age tholos tomb at Mycenae, Greece

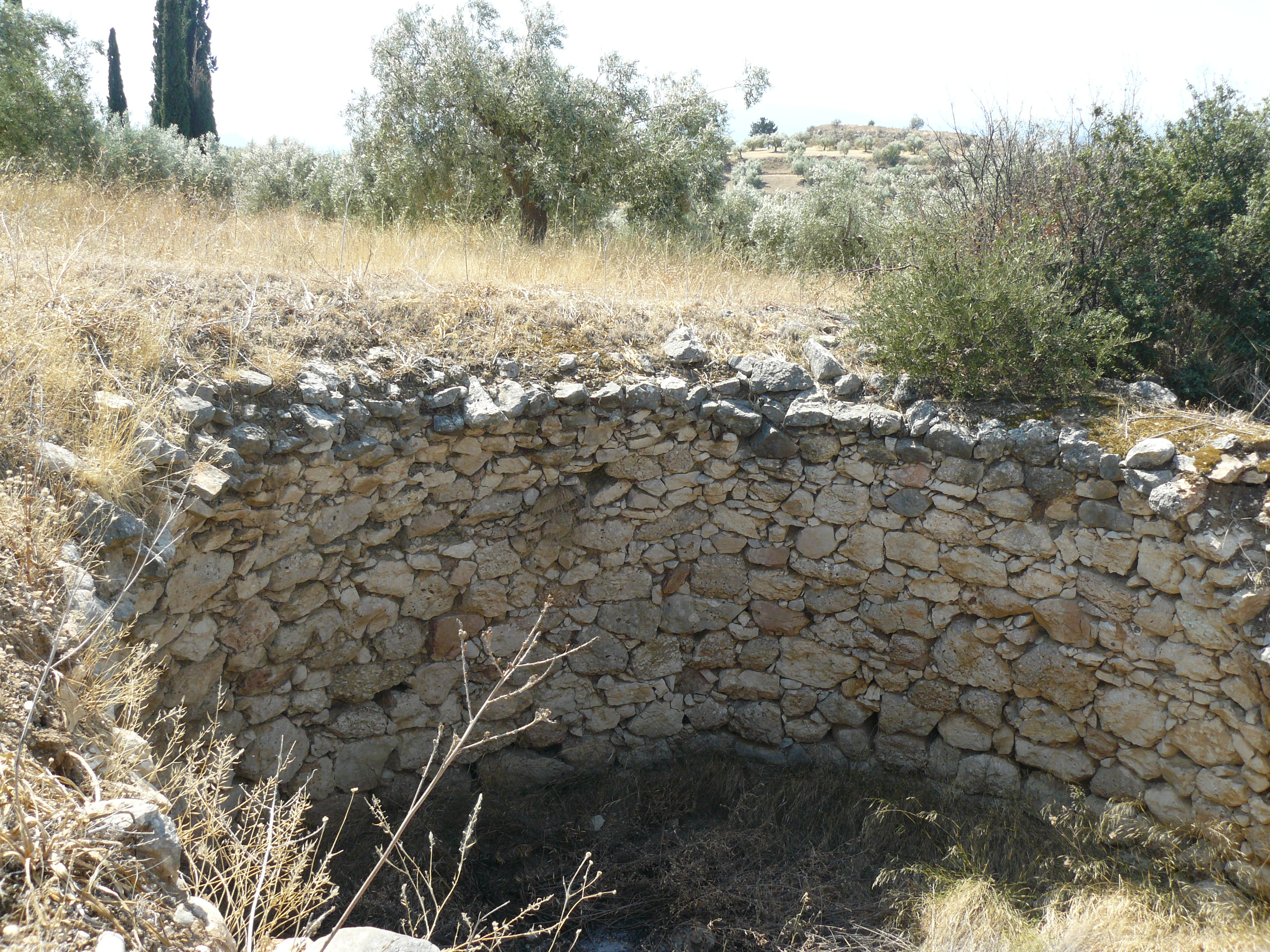
- The tomb's chamber, with collapsed roof, photographed in 2013

- Location of the Cyclopean Tomb in the Peloponnese
- 37°43′43″N 22°44′57″E
- Type: Mycenaean tholos tomb
- Periods: Late Helladic IIA
- Location: Mycenae, Argolis, Greece

Site notes
- Excavation dates: 1891; 1922
- Archaeologists: Christos Tsountas; Alan Wace
- Public access: Yes

UNESCO World Heritage Site
- Designated: 1999
- Part of: Archaeological Sites of Mycenae and Tiryns
- Reference no.: 941

The Cyclopean Tomb is a Mycenaean tholos tomb at the Bronze Age site of Mycenae in southern Greece. Dating to the early Late Helladic IIA period, which itself dates to approximately 1635/1600 –1480/1470 BCE, it is one of the earliest tholos tombs at the site, and comparatively simple in construction. Like other examples of the type, it consisted of a round burial chamber surmounted by a corbelled roof, itself entered by a narrow rectangular passage known as the dromos. However, unlike later and more elaborate tombs, the dromos was not reinforced with masonry, nor were the stones used to construct the tomb shaped during the building process.

The tomb was known before the first modern excavations of Mycenae, which took place in the late nineteenth century, but large parts of it had collapsed prior to its archaeological study. Christos Tsountas excavated the tomb in 1891, recovering modest finds including a bronze dagger; Alan Wace re-studied the tomb and found several sherds of pottery from the tomb's dromos and stomion (threshold). Two of these sherds postdated the Mycenaean period, and have been interpreted as possible evidence for the worship of revered or mythical ancestors (hero cult) at the tomb.

== Description ==
The Cyclopean Tomb is a tholos tomb. Tholos tombs, or tholoi, are a form of monumental burial that originated in Messenia, in southwest Greece, at the end of the Middle Helladic III period (that is, c. 1700 – c. 1675 BCE). They may have developed as a more monumental version of the burial mounds, or tumuli, used in mainland Greece throughout the Middle Helladic period; they may also have been influenced by similar styles of built tombs used in Minoan Crete.

Tholoi consist of a narrow rectangular entrance passage, known as the dromos, which leads into an underground burial chamber, separated from the dromos by an entrance-way called the stomion, which would usually be sealed with a dry-stone wall. The walls of the chamber, and sometimes the dromos, were lined with dry-stone masonry. The chamber was capped with a rounded roof constructed by the technique of corbelling, by which courses of blocks were overlapped in increasingly small circles. They were typically used for multiple burials, perhaps of members of the same family, and many were periodically re-opened for additional interments and for ritual activity.

During the Late Bronze Age, a total of nine tholoi were constructed at Mycenae. The Cyclopean Tomb dates to the early part of the Late Helladic IIA period, which itself dates to approximately 1635/1600 –1480/1470 BCE. Alan Wace, who investigated the tholoi of Mycenae in the early 1920s, assessed it and the nearby Panagia Tholos to be the oldest tholoi at the site, based on what he considered their primitive construction. It is located approximately 600 m (660 yd) east-southeast of the citadel of Mycenae, slightly to the south of the tholos known as the Tomb of the Genii.

Wace considered the tomb "of a very primitive type" in design and construction. It is named for its construction from Cyclopean masonry, which consists of large, unworked pieces of limestone and conglomerate stacked on top of each other. Unlike later tholoi at Mycenae, the dromos is simply cut, without reinforcement with masonry. The chamber and stomion are constructed of undressed stones of various sizes. No burial pit was found in the chamber, nor any trace of plaster covering the walls; the latter is found in later tombs such as the Tomb of Aegisthus and the Kato Phournos tholos.

The tomb's dromos is 12–13 metres (39–43 ft) in length and 2 metres (6.6 ft) wide. The stomion is 3 metres (9.8 ft) high, 1.4 metres (4.6 ft) wide, and 3.4 metres (11 ft) deep. The sides of the dromos, which is cut into soft rock, collapsed prior to their measurement in the early twentieth century; much of the chamber roof is also collapsed. The chamber is around 8 metres (26 ft) in diameter; Wace estimated that the original height would have been approximately the same, based on the example of similar tholoi.

== Archaeological investigations ==
Plan of the Cyclopean Tomb, made by Piet de Jong under the direction of Alan Wace in 1920–1922.

The existence of the Cyclopean Tomb was known before the first major excavations at Mycenae, led by Heinrich Schliemann and Panagiotis Stamatakis, in 1876. (Note: Antonaccio 1995, p. 32. On Stamatakis, see Vasilikou 2011, p. 79.) As with the other tholoi at Mycenae, it was not discovered intact, but had been looted in antiquity, probably during the Iron Age. Christos Tsountas cleared the tomb in 1891, but never published the results of his work in detail. In his brief report to the Archaeological Society of Athens, he described the tholos as "the smallest of all, and the poorest in terms of construction". He noted finding only a single bronze knife, wrapped in gold leaf, and some glass beads: he considered these finds "consistent with the poverty of the construction". He additionally found objects including fragments of an ivory rod, a broken obsidian arrowhead, and a broken seal-stone made from steatite.

In 1922, Wace examined material from Tsountas's spoil heaps, which included parts of the fill of the dromos and chamber, and re-investigated the dromos and stomion. During this process he found several fragments of pottery from the Late Helladic II period (c. 1635/1600 – c. 1420/1410 BCE), a small number from the Middle Helladic period (to c. 1675 BCE) and a larger number from the Late Helladic III period (c. 1420/1410 – c. 1075/1050 BCE), which Tsountas had removed from the dromos and the stomion. (Note: Specifically, Wace counted nine LH II sherds and forty LH III sherds from the dromos, and four MH, eight LH II, and twenty-six LH III sherds from the stomion.) His investigation also discovered a single sherd of pottery dating to the Geometric period (c. 900 – c. 700 BCE), and a fragment of tile he described as "Hellenic", from the stomion. (Note: Wace 1923, pp. 291–292. For the dates of the Geometric Period, see Cosmopoulos 2015, p. 167.) Carla Antonaccio interprets this, along with similar finds of post-Mycenaean material in other tombs, as possible evidence for the worship of revered or mythical ancestors (hero cult) at the tomb after the Bronze Age.

== Bibliography ==
- Antonaccio, Carla (1995). An Archaeology of Ancestors: Tomb Cult and Hero Cult in Early Greece. Lanham: Rowman & Littlefield. ISBN 0-8476-7941-1.
- Cavanagh, William (2008). "Death and the Mycenaeans". In Shelmerdine, Cynthia (ed.). The Cambridge Companion to the Aegean Bronze Age. Cambridge University Press. pp. 327–341. doi:10.1017/CCOL9780521814447.015. ISBN 978-1-139-00189-2.
- Cosmopoulos, Michael B. (2015). Bronze Age Eleusis and the Origins of the Eleusinian Mysteries. Cambridge University Press. doi:10.1017/CBO9780511820700. ISBN 978-1-107-01099-4.
- Galanakis, Yannis (2007). "The Construction of the Aegisthus Tholos Tomb at Mycenae and the 'Helladic Heresy'". The Annual of the British School at Athens. 102: 239–256. doi:10.1017/S0068245400021481. ISSN 0068-2454. JSTOR 30245251. S2CID 162590402.
- Manning, Stuart (2010). "Chronology and Terminology". In Cline, Eric (ed.). The Oxford Handbook of the Bronze Age Aegean. Oxford University Press. pp. 11–30. ISBN 978-0-19-536550-4.
- Maravelia, Amanda-Alice (2001). "The Orientations of the Nine Tholos Tombs at Mycenae". Archaeoastronomy. Journal for the History of Astronomy Supplement 33. 27: S63–S66. doi:10.1177/002182860203302705.
- Mason, David J. (2007). "The Location of the Treasury of Atreus". Oxford Journal of Archaeology. 26 (1): 35–52. doi:10.1111/j.1468-0092.2007.00272.x.
- Mee, Christopher (2010). "Death and Burial". In Cline, Eric (ed.). The Oxford Handbook of the Bronze Age Aegean. Oxford University Press. pp. 277–290. ISBN 978-0-19-536550-4.
- Papadimitriou, Nikolas (2015). "The Formation and Use of Dromoi in Early Mycenaean Tombs". The Annual of the British School at Athens. 110 (1): 71–120. JSTOR 44082107.
- Tsountas, Christos (1893). Μυκἡναι [Mycenae] (PDF). Πρακτικά της εν Αθήναις Αρχαιολογικής Εταιρείας [Proceedings of the Archaeological Society of Athens] (in Greek): 19–20.
- Vasilikou, Dora (2011). Το χρονικό της ανασκαφής των Μυκηνών, 1870–1878 [The Chronology of the Excavation of Mycenae, 1870–1878] (PDF) (in Greek). Athens: Archaeological Society of Athens. ISBN 978-960-8145-87-0.
- Voutsaki, Sofia (1998). "Mortuary Evidence, Symbolic Meanings and Social Change: A Comparison Between Messenia and the Argolid in the Mycenaean Period". In Branigan, Keith (ed.). Cemetery and Society in the Aegean Bronze Age. Sheffield Studies in Aegean Archaeology. Sheffield Academic Press. pp. 41–58. ISBN 1-85075-822-0.
- Wace, Alan (1923). "Excavations at Mycenae § IX — The Tholos Tombs". The Annual of the British School at Athens. 25: 283–402. doi:10.1017/S0068245400010352. S2CID 183795426.
