= Andreas Furtwängler =

German archaeologist

Andreas Ernst Gottfried Furtwängler (born 11 November 1944, Zürich) is a German classical archaeologist and numismatist, and professor of classical archeology at Martin-Luther-Universität Halle-Wittenberg. He is the son of the conductor Wilhelm Furtwängler and grandson of the archaeologist Adolf Furtwängler.

His work was celebrated by a Festschrift in 2009.

== Life ==
He received his PhD in 1973 at Heidelberg University with a thesis on ancient Greek numismatics supervised by Herbert A. Cahn. He worked from 1976 to 1981 at the German Archaeological Institute at Athens. In 1991, he was habilitated at the University of Saarbrucken and since 1994. He is a corresponding member of the German Archaeological Institute at Athens.

From 1993 to 2003 he carried out excavations and surveys in Georgia, and since 2002 he has been involved in the Daisen Didyma project.

== Selected publications ==
- Monnaies grecques en Gaule. Le trésor d'Auriol et le monnayage de Massalia 525/520 - 460 av. J.C., Fribourg 1978 (Typos, 3) [= Dissertation]
- with Hermann J. Kienast: Samos, 3. Der Nordbau im Heraion von Samos, Bonn 1989
- with Thanassis Kalpaxes; Alain Schnapp: Eλεύθερνα, 2, 2. Éνα ελληνιστικό σπίτι (σπίτι A) στη θέση Nησί, Rethymnon 1994
- with Gerhard Zimmer; G. Schneider: Demetrias, 6. Hellenistische Bronzegusswerkstätten in Demetrias. Lampenproduktion und -importe im hellenistischen Demetrias. Amphorenfunde in Demetrias., Würzburg 2003
