= Vaphio =

Archaeological site in Laconia, Greece

Coordinates: 37°01′20″N 22°27′39″E

Vapheio
- Βαφειό (Greek)
- Location within Greece
- Type: Settlement and tholos tomb
- Periods: Late Bronze Age
- Cultures: Mycenaean/Minoan influence
- Location: Laconia, Greece
- Region: Peloponnese
- Part of: Mycenaean Greece

History
- Built: c. 16th century BCE

Site notes
- Excavation dates: 1889
- Archaeologists: Christos Tsountas
- Management: Greek Ministry of Culture
- Public access: Yes

Vaphio, Vafio or Vapheio is an ancient site in Laconia, Greece, on the right bank of the Eurotas, some 5 mi (8.0 km) south of Sparta. It is famous for its tholos or beehive tomb, excavated in 1889 by Christos Tsountas. This consists of a walled approach, about 97 ft (30 m) long, leading to a vaulted chamber some 33 ft (10 m) in diameter, in the floor of which the actual grave was cut. The tomb suffered considerable damage in the decades following its excavation. During conservation work in 1962 the walls were restored to a height of about 6 m (20 ft).

The main objects found there were transferred to the National Archaeological Museum of Athens, where many remain on display. Many are regarded as Minoan art, while others are thought to have been made on mainland Greece. The pottery in the tomb dates to around 1500 to 1450 BC, but the gold and carved gem seals might have been old when buried. The Cretan one of the famous pair of gold Vaphio Cups perhaps dates to the previous century.

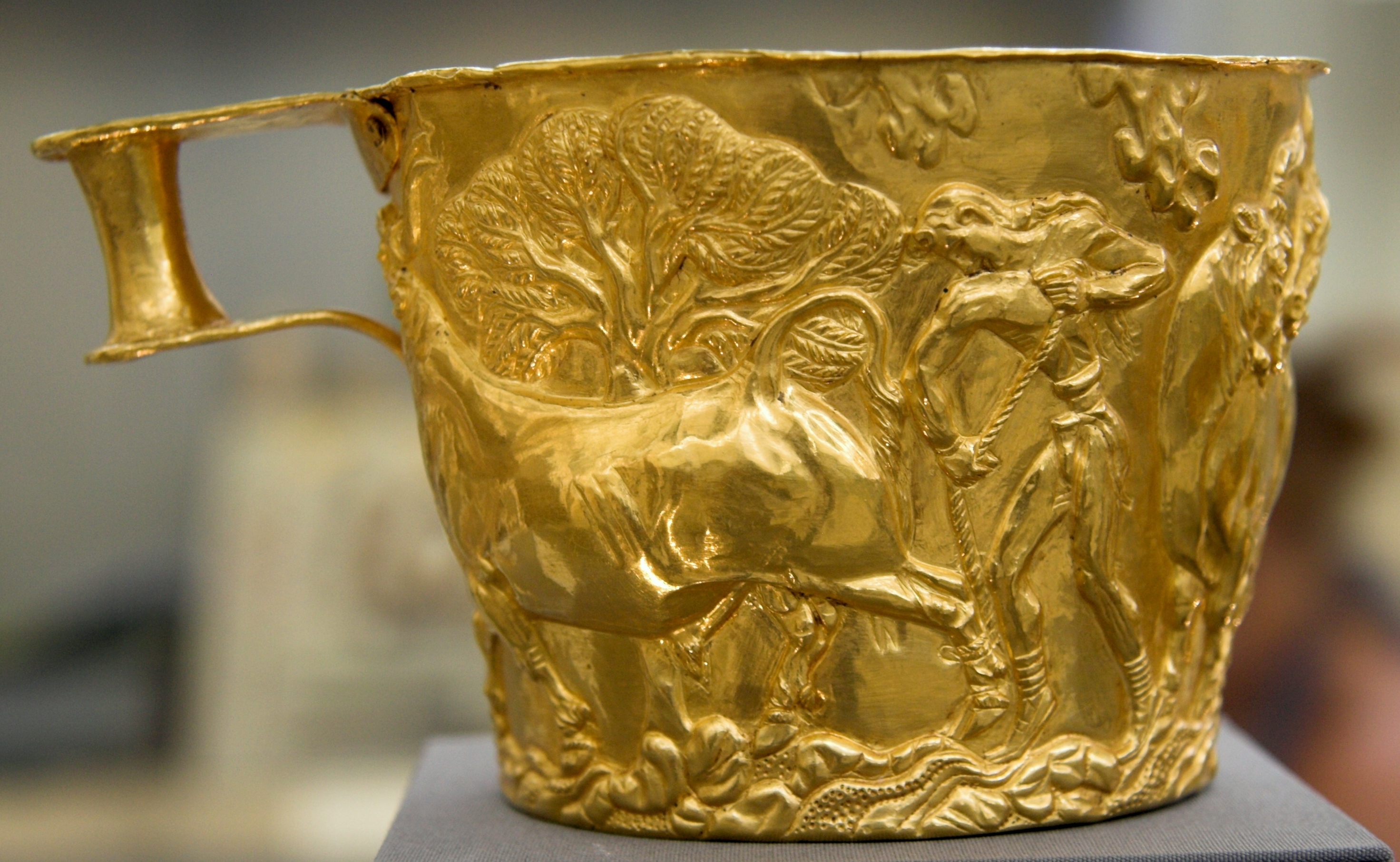
The seduced bull is tethered, on the cup thought to be Cretan

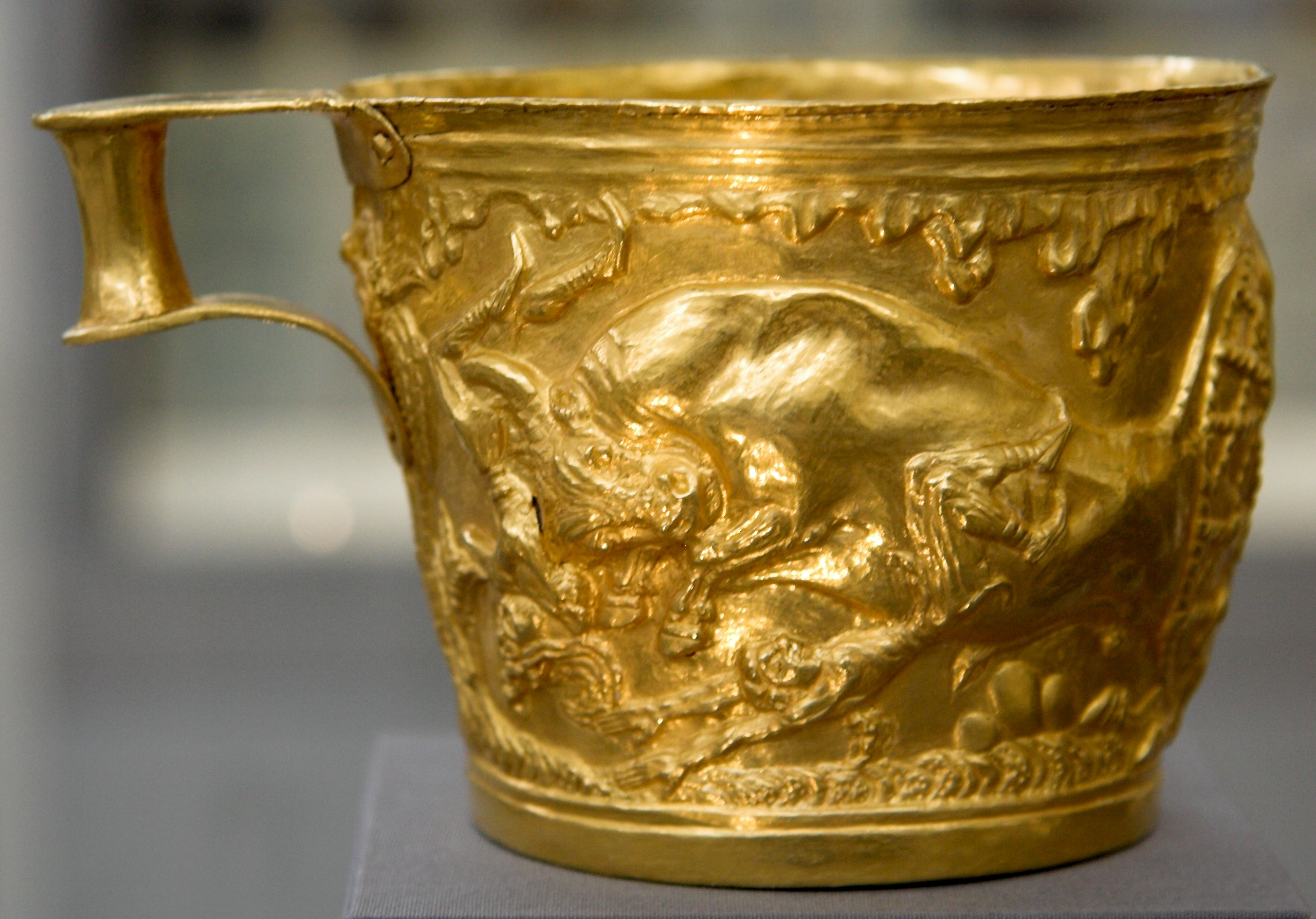
A charging bull tosses a human with its horns, having knocked another down and escaped the net at right. On the cup thought to be Mycenaean

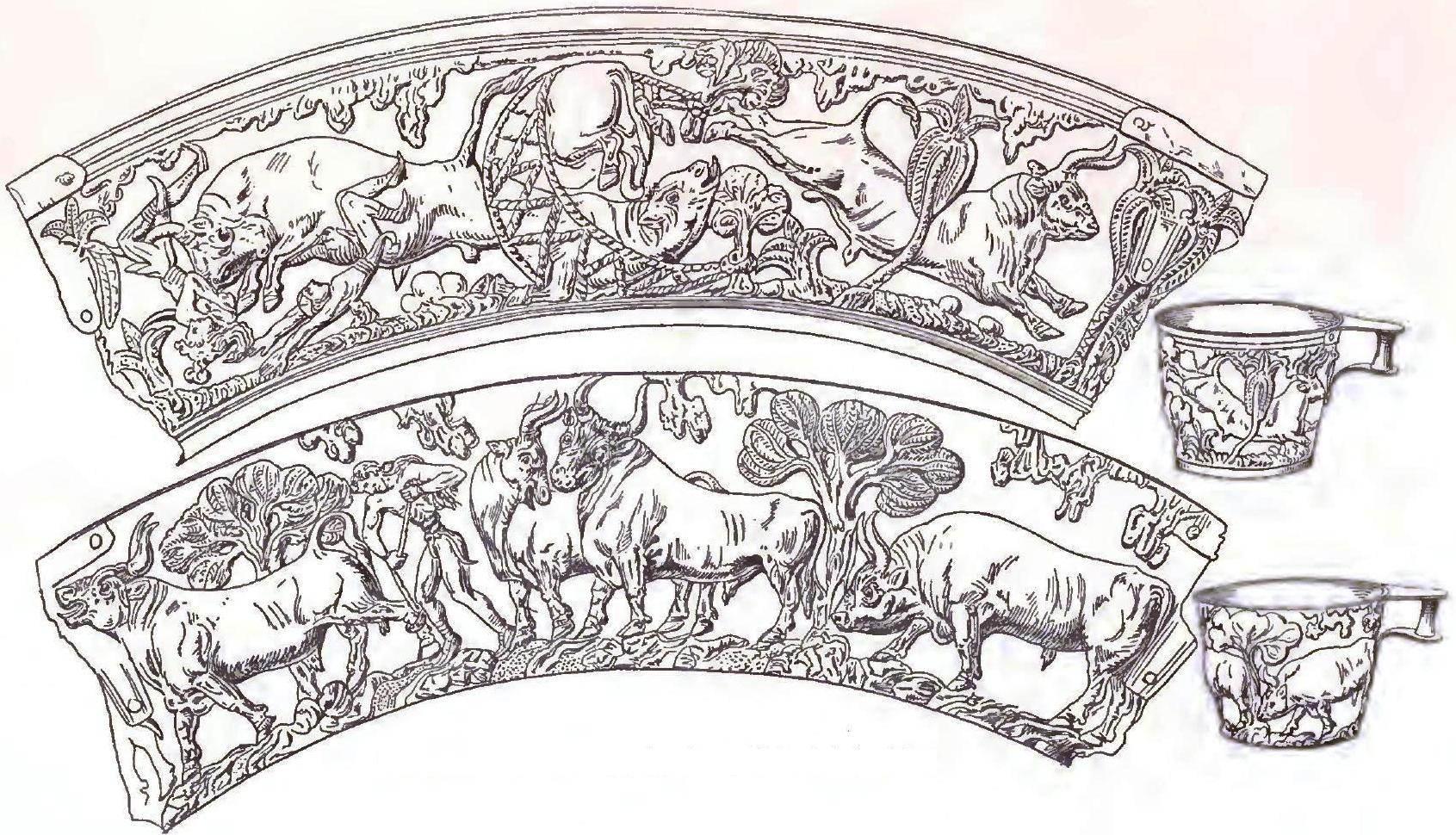
Drawing of the two designs

== Objects found ==
The objects include a large number of carved gem seals and amethyst beads, together with articles in gold, silver, bronze, iron, lead, amber and crystal. Many of the seals and rings found in the tholos have such strong affinities in style and subject matter with contemporary Minoan seals that archaeologists find it impossible to determine whether they were locally made or imported from Crete. Sinclair Hood believed that at this date "it was broadly speaking possible to classify the finer seals as being of Cretan, the more crudely engraved of mainland manufacture", but that "this criterion no longer applies after the mainland conquest of Crete c. 1450".

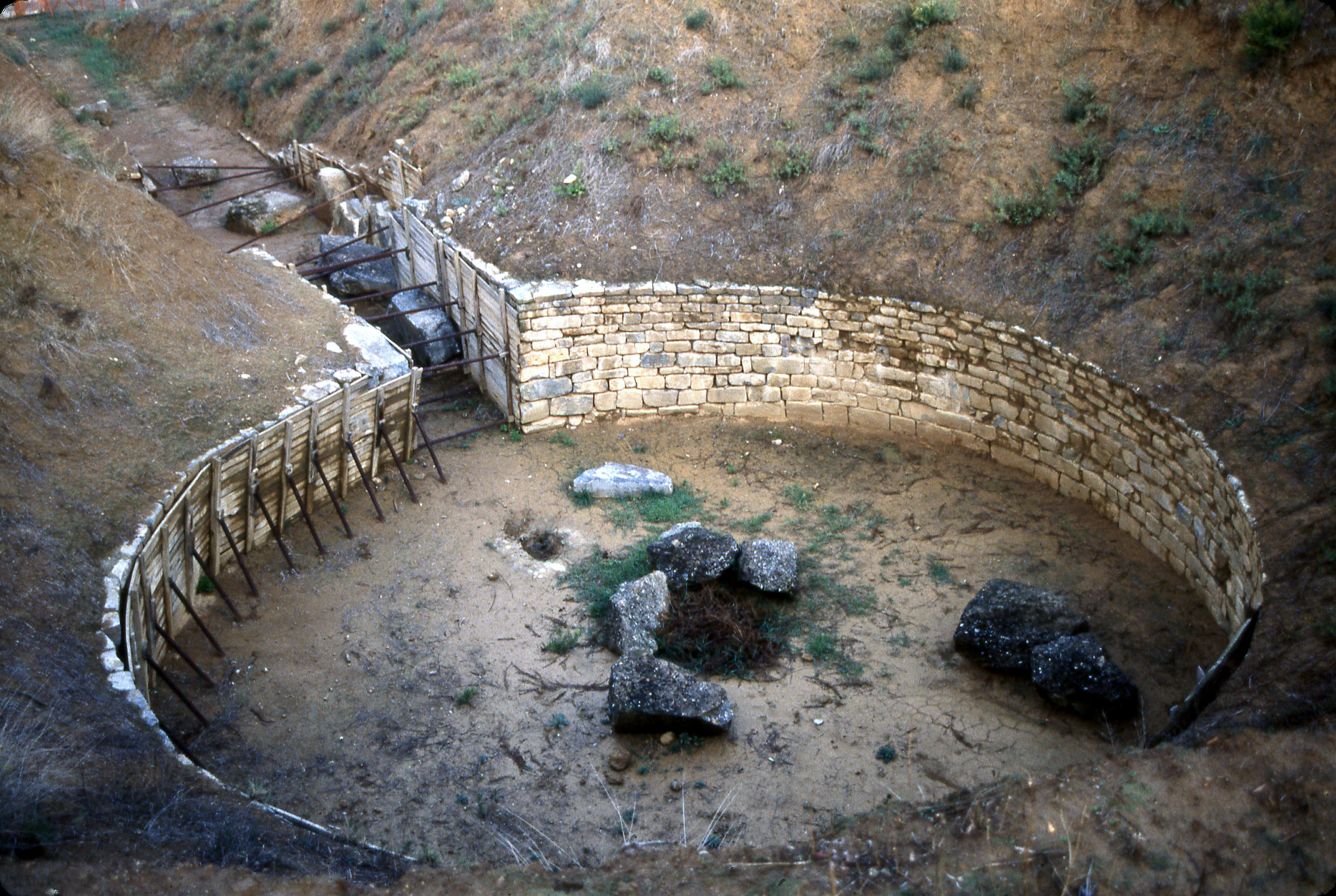
Remains of the tholos tomb at Vaphio in 1990

Vaphio is the largest find in the Aegean of Mycenaen and Minoan seals (as opposed to "sealings" - impressions on clay). Like Grave Circle A at Mycenae, the group has generated much discussion as to the origin of many pieces. The 43 seals in the tomb include a variety of fine stones, and gold, and several have parallels in Cretan finds. The princely figure buried there seems to have worn them on his wrists, like a modern charm bracelet.

=== The gold cups ===
By far the finest of the grave goods are a pair of golden cups decorated with scenes in relief, showing two different methods of capturing bulls, perhaps for the bull-leaping activities practised by the Minoan civilization of Crete, or for sacrifice. On one, with three scenes, a cow is used to lure a bull; they mate, and a rear leg is then roped; this is sometimes called the "Peaceful Cup" or the "Quiet Cup". In the other, the "Violent Cup", bulls are stampeded into nets, although one seems to escape, shoving catchers aside. The so-called "Violent Cup", showing netting of bulls, bears a remarkable resemblance to the description of the beginning of the ritual of consecration for the laws of Atlantis described in Plato's dialogue Critias, where bulls are captured for sacrifice, using no iron tools or weapons.

These "form perhaps the most perfect works of Mycenaean or Minoan art which have survived", according to Marcus Niebuhr Tod. Sir Kenneth Clark observed that even on such evolved works "the men are insignificant compared to the stupendous bulls". It seems likely that these Vaphio Cups do not represent a local art but that at least one was imported from Crete, which at that early period was far ahead of mainland Greece in artistic development. As further support for the connection to Crete, C. Michael Hogan notes that a charging bull painting is evocative of an image extant at the Palace of Knossos on Crete.

It had long been recognised that the cups were probably not by the same artist, and had stylistic differences. Ellen Davis suggested that at least one of the cups was produced in mainland Greece. Davis illustrates both the compositional and stylistic differences between the cups, demonstrating that one appears to be Minoan and the other Mycenaean. Hood agreed, and this is now the usual view. There is a difference in quality, the Cretan "seduction" cup being finer, and in the treatment of the tops and bottoms of the scenes.

Rather confusingly, "Vapheio cup" is now used as a term for the shape of the gold cups in Aegean archaeology, which is found in pottery as well as metalwork.
