= Lesley Fitton =

British classical archaeologist

Lesley Fitton FSA
- Born: 1953 (age 72–73); Rochdale

Academic work
- Discipline: Classical archaeology
- Institutions: British Museum
- Notable works: Minoans, Cycladic Art

Josephine Lesley Fitton OBE (born 1953) is a British classical archaeologist and from 2007 to 2023 the Keeper of the Department of Greece and Rome at the British Museum. She is particularly known for her work on the Minoans, the Cyclades, and the Greek Bronze Age.

== Education and career ==
Fitton was born in Rochdale in 1953 and attended Bury Grammar School for Girls where she was friends with Victoria Wood.

Fitton has spent her career working at the British Museum. She started as a research assistant in the Department of Greece and Rome, and then progressed to become the Assistant Keeper responsible for the Greek Bronze Age collections. Since 2007, Fitton has been the Keeper (Head of Department).

She was elected a Fellow of the Society of Antiquaries on 29 April 1999.

Fitton's current work includes the digitisation of the collection of Cypriot antiquities at the British Museum. She also works on Troy.

Fitton has written a number of books to make her subject matter accessible to undergraduates and general readers. Her 2002 book Minoans was pitched to make the latest archaeological information accessible and affordable to students.

She was appointed Officer of the Order of the British Empire (OBE) in the 2021 New Year Honours for services to museums and the arts.

== Television and film ==
Fitton has appeared or consulted on several television series:

=== Appearances ===
- Troy: From Ruins to Reality (2005)
- Attacking Troy (2007)

=== Consultant ===
- The Minoans (2004)
- Helen of Troy (2005)

=== Troy ===
Fitton also gave advice on historical accuracy to the producers and cast of Troy in 2004. Fitton reflected on her experience in a 2009 volume on the film, where she considered whether the film should have adhered more closely to historical facts. While Fitton believed that the film could have done more to reflect historical and archaeological realities, she concluded that:

Yet my personal view is that the story is not history, that Homer was not a historian, and that something of Homer would certainly have been lost in a purist archaeological approach. Ultimately, dramatic success matters more than the archaeological accuracy of Helen’s hairpins. It matters more for modern audiences to feel for Achilles in his progress from war machine to man, to sympathize with Hector in his efforts to defend all that was dear to him, and in the end to mourn for Priam and for Troy.

== Selected publications ==
- J.L. Fitton, A. Villing, V. Turner, A. Shapland, Troy: Myth and Reality : the BP Exhibition (Thames and Hudson, 2019).
- J.L. Fitton 'Veronica Tatton-Brown, Cyprus, and the British Museum' in ed. T Kiely Ancient Cyprus in the British Museum. Essays in honour of Veronica Tatton-Brown (British Museum Press, 2009) pp. v-viii.
- J.L. Fitton 'Troy and the Role of the Historical Advisor' in ed. Martin M Winckler Troy: From Homer's Iliad to Hollywood Epic (John Wiley & Sons, 2009) pp. 99–106.
- J.L. Fitton (ed.), The Aigina Treasure. Aegean Bronze Age jewelry and a mystery revealed (London, British Museum Press, 2009).
- J.L. Fitton, N. Meeks and L. Joyner, 'The Aigina Treasure: Catalogue and Technical Report', in Fitton (ed.) 2009, pp. 17–31.
- J.L.Fitton, 'Links in a chain: Aigina, Dahshur and Tod’, in Fitton (ed.) 2009, pp. 61–6.
- J.L. Fitton, Contributions to, J. Aruz, K. Benzel and J. Evans (eds.), Beyond Babylon. Art, trade and diplomacy in the Second Millennium B.C. (Metropolitan Museum, New York, 2008).
- J. L. Fitton, Minoans (London, British Museum Press, 2002).
- J. L. Fitton, Cycladic Art (London, British Museum Press (2nd ed.), 1999).
- J. L. Fitton, The Discovery of the Greek Bronze Age (London, British Museum Press, 1995).
- J. L. Fitton, 'Charles Newton and the Discovery of the Greek Bronze Age' Bulletin of the Institute of Classical Studies. Supplement, (63), 1995 73-78
- J. L. Fitton, Heinrich Schliemann and the British Museum (British Museum Occasional Paper 83, London, British Museum, 1991).
- J. L. Fitton (ed.), Cycladica: Studies in Memory of N. P. Goulandris (London, British Museum Press, 1984).
