= Lippold ben Chluchim =

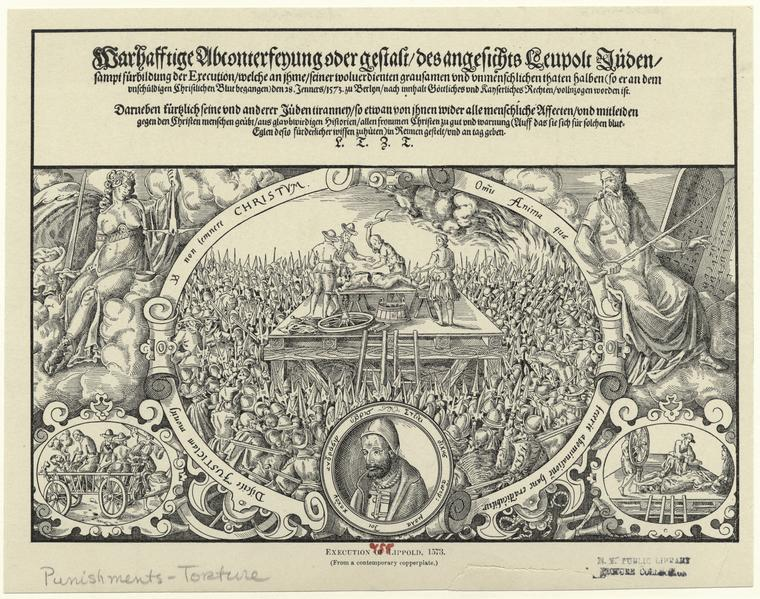
- Born: 1530; Prague
- Died: 28 January 1573 (aged 42–43); Berlin

Lippold or Leupold ben Chluchim (Hluchen), also known as Yom Tov ben Yehuda Ha-Cohen (1530–1573) was a German-Jewish financier, mint-master and court Jew to Joachim II Hector, Elector of Brandenburg. Lippold funded Joachim's alchemy experiments. After Joachim's death in 1571, Lippold was falsely blamed for poisoning him, inciting an anti-Jewish mob that plundered homes and desecrated the synagogue, expelling all of the Jews of Brandenburg, imprisoning Lippold and burning him to death. Lippold was killed and quartered in the town square in 1573. Lippold was later used as an example by Nazi-era educator Ernst Dobers in an antisemitic textbook, and was criticized for his supposedly excessive interest rates.

== Jewish Encyclopedia bibliography ==
- Ludwig Geiger, Gesch. der Juden in Berlin, p. vi., Berlin, 1871;
- Grätz, Gesch. 2d ed., ix. 474.
