= Heinrich Brunn =

German classical archaeologist (1822–1894)

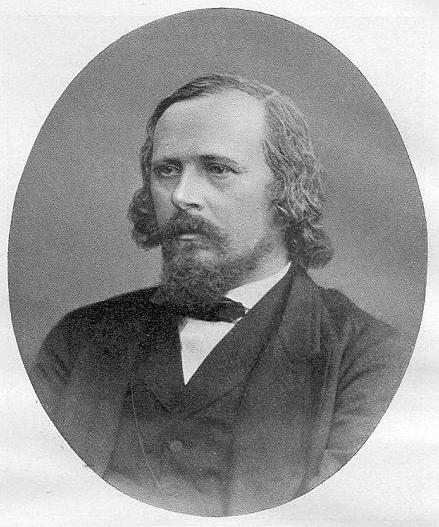
Heinrich Brunn

Heinrich Brunn, since 1882 Ritter von Brunn (23 January 1822, Wörlitz, Anhalt-Dessau – 23 July 1894, Josephstal near Schliersee, Upper Bavaria) was a German archaeologist. He was known for taking a scientific approach in his investigations of classical Greek and Roman art, being credited with introducing the method of determining the date and source of sculptural fragments by way of thorough analysis of the account of anatomic detail.

== Biography ==
Brunn studied archaeology and philology at the University of Bonn, where he was influenced by the teachings of Friedrich Gottlieb Welcker (1784–1868) and Friedrich Ritschl (1806–1876). In 1843, he received his doctorate degree with the work Artificum liberae Graeciae tempora, afterwards moving to Rome, where for several years he was associated with the German Archaeological Institute (DAI).

In 1853, he received an appointment at Bonn, but within a few years, returned to Rome as second secretary of the DAI, serving under Wilhelm Henzen (1816–1887). In 1865, he was chosen inaugural professor for archaeology at the Ludwig-Maximilians-Universität München. Among his pupils were Gustav Körte, Adolf Furtwängler, Heinrich Wölfflin, Julius Langbehn, Paul Arndt, Walther Amelung, Arthur Milchhöfer, Panagiotis Kavvadias and Heinrich Bulle.

From 1865 up until his death in 1894, he was director of the Glyptothek in Munich, publishing in 1868, a guide to the museum, called Beschreibung der Glyptothek König Ludwig's I. zu München. For a number of years, he collected artwork for the Glyptothek, being instrumental in making the museum an important center for the study of classical sculpture. Brunn's impressive collection of casts at the Glyptothek was destroyed during World War II (1944).

He was co-founder of Denkmäler griechischer und römischer Skulptur in historischer Anordung (1888), and was author of Geischichte der griechischen Künstler, a publication that helped establish a chronology of ancient Greek art history. His collection of smaller works, Heinrich Brunn's kleine Schriften gesammelt (1898–1906), was published in three volumes after his death.

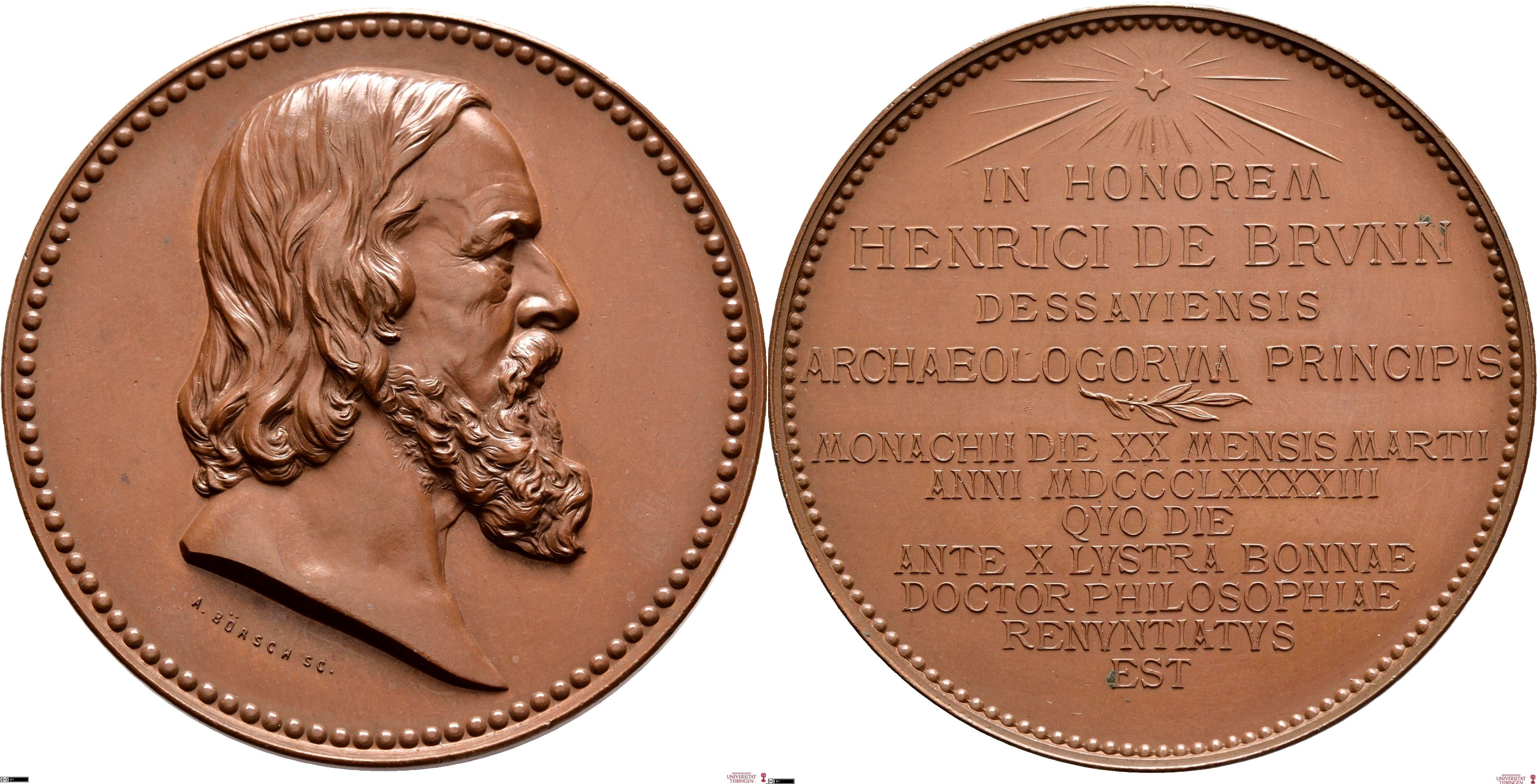
Medal Heinrich von Brunn 1893

He was ennobled, becoming Heinrich von Brunn, by the Bavarian Government in 1882. In 1893, he received a medal in occasion of his 50th doctoral anniversary.
