= Gerhard Zimmer =

German classical archaeologist (born 1949)

- Born: 23 May 1949 (age 77); Dillingen an der Donau, Bavaria, West Germany
- Education: LMU Munich
- Title: Professor of Classical Archaeology, Catholic University of Eichstätt-Ingolstadt
- Term: 1999−

Gerhard Zimmer (born 23 May 1949) is a German classical archaeologist, currently a Professor of Classical Archaeology at the Catholic University of Eichstätt-Ingolstadt. He is the author of several books on classical archaeology, primarily about the Western Roman Empire and its successor barbarian states.

Zimmer studied classical philology, German studies, and classical archaeology at LMU Munich. He completed his studies with the Staatsexamen in Latin and Greek as well as his thesis on Roman representations of trades. His supervisor was Paul Zanker. He worked in the Mediterranean from 1978 to 1979, funded by a travel scholarship from the German Archaeological Institute (DAI). Between 1980 and 1985, he was involved with a research project on ancient bronze casting. He was, from 1984, assistant at the West Berlin section of the Antikensammlung Berlin, later curator and finally Deputy Director. In 1988, Zimmer became Professor of Greek Bronze Casting Workshops at the Free University of Berlin, while continuing to work at the collection of antiquities, where his work included several major exhibitions such as Mirror Images (1987), Civil Worlds (1993) and The Praying Boy. After lecturing at the Free University of Berlin, Zimmer moved in 1997 to the Humboldt University of Berlin. Since 31 July 1999, Gerhard Zimmer has been Professor of Classical Archaeology at the Catholic University of Eichstätt-Ingolstadt.

Zimmer's research currently focuses on processing workshop findings and reconstructing technologies of ancient bronze casting, using experimental verification to corroborate reconstructed methods.

== Publications ==
- Römische Berufsdarstellungen (Dissertation), Mann, Berlin 1982 ISBN 3-7861-1343-2
- Griechische Bronzegusswerkstätten. Zur Technologieentwicklung eines antiken Kunsthandwerks (Habilitation), Zabern, Mainz 1990 ISBN 3-8053-1090-0
- Bürgerwelten, hellenistische Tonfiguren und Nachschöpfungen im 19. Jh. (mit Irmgard Kriseleit und Cordelia Eule), von Zabern, Mainz 1995 ISBN 3-8053-1639-9
- Corpus Speculorum Etruscorum. Bundesrepublik Deutschland Teil: 4. Staatliche Museen zu Berlin, Antikensammlung 2, Hirmer, München 1995 ISBN 3-7774-6340-X
- Der Betende Knabe : Original und Experiment (Eds. with Nele Hackländer), Lang, Frankfurt am Main – Berlin – Bern – New York – Paris – Wien 1997 ISBN 3-631-31482-5
- Neues zur griechischen Bewaffnung, Kastner, Wolnzach 2001 (Eichstätter Antrittsvorlesungen, Bd. 8) ISBN 3-9807391-4-7
- Hellenistische Bronzegusswerkstätten in Demetrias, Ergon, Würzburg 2003 (Demetrias, Bd. 6) ISBN 3-89913-288-2
- Neue Forschungen zur hellenistischen Plastik. Kolloquium zum 70. Geburtstag von Georg Daltrop (Hg.), Kastner, Wolnzach 2003 ISBN 3-937082-07-7
