= Paul Arndt =

German classical archaeologist

Paul Julius Arndt
- Born: 14 October 1865; Dresden, Germany
- Died: 17 July 1937 (aged 71)
- Education: Leipzig University, Ludwig-Maximilians-Universität München
- Occupation: Classical archaeologist
- Known for: Collecting ancient sculptures and gems
- Notable work: "Denkmäler griechischer und römischer Skulptur"

Paul Julius Arndt (14 October 1865 – 17 July 1937) was a German classical archaeologist born in Dresden.

He studied classical art under Johannes Overbeck (1826-1895) at Leipzig University, and classical archeology with Heinrich Brunn (1822-1894) at the Ludwig-Maximilians-Universität München. In 1887, he graduated with a dissertation on Greek vases and worked afterwards as an assistant to Heinrich Brunn at the Ludwig-Maximilians-Universität München. Following Brunn's death in 1894, Arndt became an assistant to Adolf Furtwängler (1853-1907), and was responsible for an edition of "Denkmäler griechischer und römischer Skulptur".

Arndt was the son of a wealthy merchant in Mecklenburg, and for much of his career was financially independent, therefore having the means to work as a private scholar and dealer of Greek art. He was primarily known as a collector of ancient sculptures, a large part of which are now kept in the Glyptothek of Munich, as well as in Ny Carlsberg Glyptotek, Copenhagen. He also amassed a superb collection of ancient gems that since 1958 have been part of the Staatlich Münzsammlung in Munich.

Arndt's scientific estate is owned by the Institute of Classical Archeology of the University of Erlangen–Nuremberg.
