= Adolf Furtwängler =

German classical archaeologist (1853–1907)

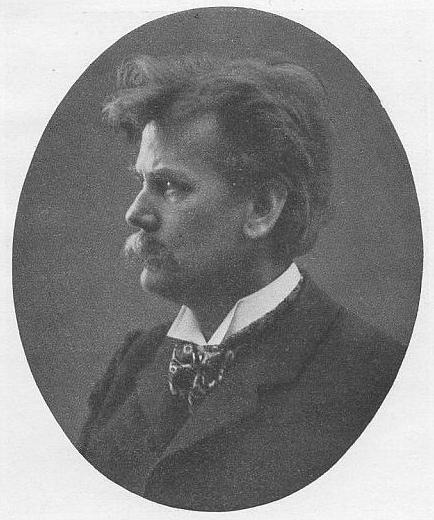
- Adolf Furtwängler
- Born: 30 June 1853; Freiburg im Breisgau, Grand Duchy of Baden
- Died: 10 October 1907 (aged 54); Athens, Greece
- Scientific career
- Fields: Archaeology

Johann Michael Adolf Furtwängler (30 June 1853 – 10 October 1907) was a German archaeologist, teacher, art historian and museum director. He was the father of the conductor Wilhelm Furtwängler and grandfather of the German archaeologist Andreas Furtwängler.

== Early life ==
Furtwängler was born at Freiburg im Breisgau, where his father was a classical scholar and schoolteacher; he was educated there, at Leipzig and at Munich, where he was a pupil of Heinrich Brunn, whose comparative method in art criticism he much developed.

== Career ==
After studying at the University of Leipzig, with Johannes Overbeck, and having graduated from Freiburg (1874), with a dissertation, Eros in der Vasenmalerei, he spent the academic years 1876-1878 supported by a scholarship at the German Archaeological Institute, studying in Italy and Greece. In 1878, he participated in Ernst Curtius’ excavations at Olympia.

In 1879, he published with Georg Loeschcke Mykenische Thongefäβe, a complete publication of the Mycenaean pottery finds on Aegina. This not only provided a valuable chronology but also represented the first corpus of pottery finds in archaeology. The study was the first to distinguish between Mycenaean and Geometric styles in pottery, and contributed to the developing technique of identifying archaeological strata, and giving them relative dates, through the painting styles represented on pottery sherds, which previously had been discarded as spoil. By noting the recurrence of similar vases within a variety of strata Furtwangler was able to use these sherds as a tool for dating sites.

On the strength of this, Furtwängler received double appointments the following year (1880) as assistant director at the Royal Museums of Berlin (Königliche Museen zu Berlin) and as a privatdozent at the University of Berlin. In later years Furtwängler concluded he had dedicated his best years to the museum. His catalogue of the Saburov collection (1883–87) demonstrated his mastery of classical terracottas.

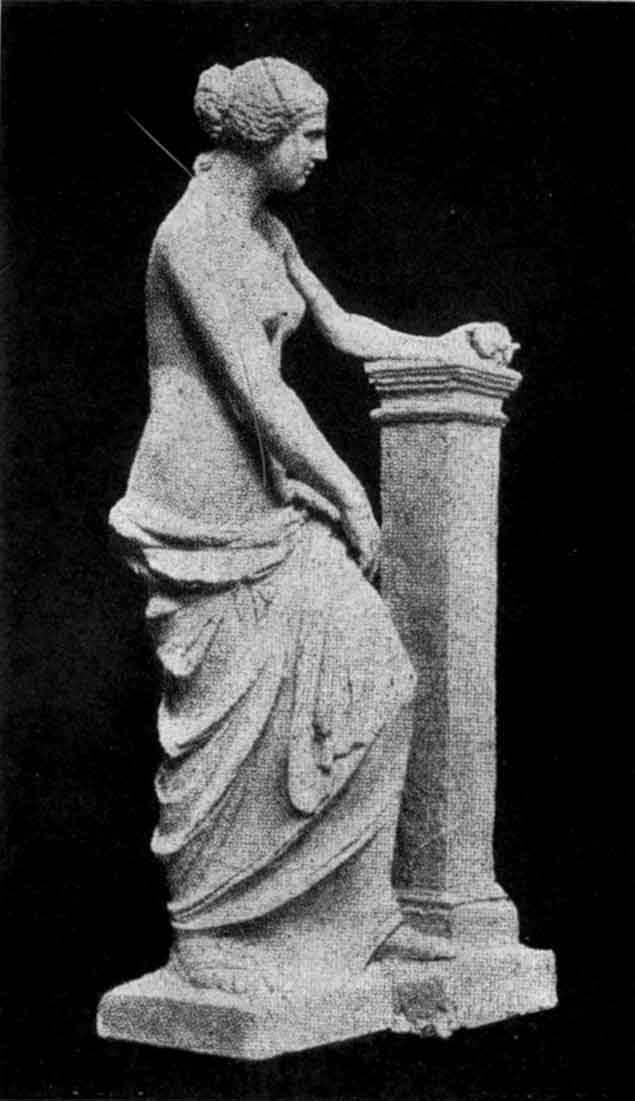
Furtwängler's proposed restoration of the Venus de Milo.

In 1885 he married Adelheid Wendt, daughter of philologist Gustav Wendt. The same year, his catalogue of the Greek pottery of the Antikensammlung Berlin, Beschreibung der Vasensammlung im Antiquarium (2 vols.) was published. His book on Greek sculpture, Meisterwerke der griechischen Plastik (1893) made his name familiar to a wider audience; an English translation Masterpieces of Greek Sculpture, translated by Eugénie Sellers Strong, appeared in 1895. Through connoisseurship he refined identifications of the Greek sculptors responsible for the originals of many works known only through Roman copies; many of his attributions still stand, though the most recent scholarship in the field has moved away from assigning sculptors' names to masterpieces. His 1891 reconstructions of the Lemnian Athena by Phidias were celebrated but have subsequently occasioned dispute; they may be found in the Dresden Albertinum.

In 1894, he left Berlin to succeed his early mentor, Heinrich von Brunn, as professor of classical archaeology in Munich, where he was also Director of the Munich Glyptothek. In 1896 in his book Beschreibung der geschnittenen Steine im Antiquarium, Furtwängler excluded from his own catalogues of engraved stones in Berlin those engraved gems that were associated with magic, as their artistic value was considered by him not important. For this reason, he was convinced that these types of engraved stones should also be removed from the display of the collection in the Department of Egyptology.

Furtwängler published a study on Greek engraved gems and their inscriptions Die Antiken Gemmen (1900). With Karl W. Reichhold he initiated the corpus of Greek vases, Griechische Vasenmalerei in 1904, issued in fascicles. After Furtwängler's death, Friedrich Hauser assumed editorship; a third volume of Furtwängler's Griechische Vasenmalerei was published in 1932.

In the field, he renewed the excavations at the temple of Aphaia in Aegina, southwest of Athens; the work resulted in a monograph of the site (1906), but the following year resulted in the dysentery contracted at the site from which he died (October 10, 1907), in the full maturity of his career. He was buried in Athens. His grave is located at the First Cemetery of Athens.

== Family ==
Adolf Furtwängler and Adelheid Wendt (1863–1944) had four children: conductor Wilhelm Furtwängler (1886–1954), the mountaineer Walter Furtwängler (1887–1967), Märit (Martha, 1891–1971), who married philosopher Max Scheler in 1912 , and Annele (Anna, 1900–1974). Their grandson Andreas E. Furtwängler (born 1944) is also a classical archaeologist, who was professor of Classical Archaeology at the University of Halle (1994-2010).

== Assessment and legacy ==
Furtwängler wrote extensively. His work not only influenced the field of archaeological criticism but also affected its standing both at home and abroad.

Among his numerous publications, the most important were a volume on the bronzes found at Olympia, vast works on ancient gems and Greek vases, and the invaluable Meisterwerke der griechischen Plastik (Masterpieces of Greek Sculpture) (1893 and 1908; English translations by Eugenie Strong and Taylor, London, 1914).

Furtwängler's students formed an outstanding group among the next generation of classical art historians and archaeologists, and his published research was of wide influence.
