= Mycenaean chamber tomb =

Type of chamber tomb built in Mycenaean Greece

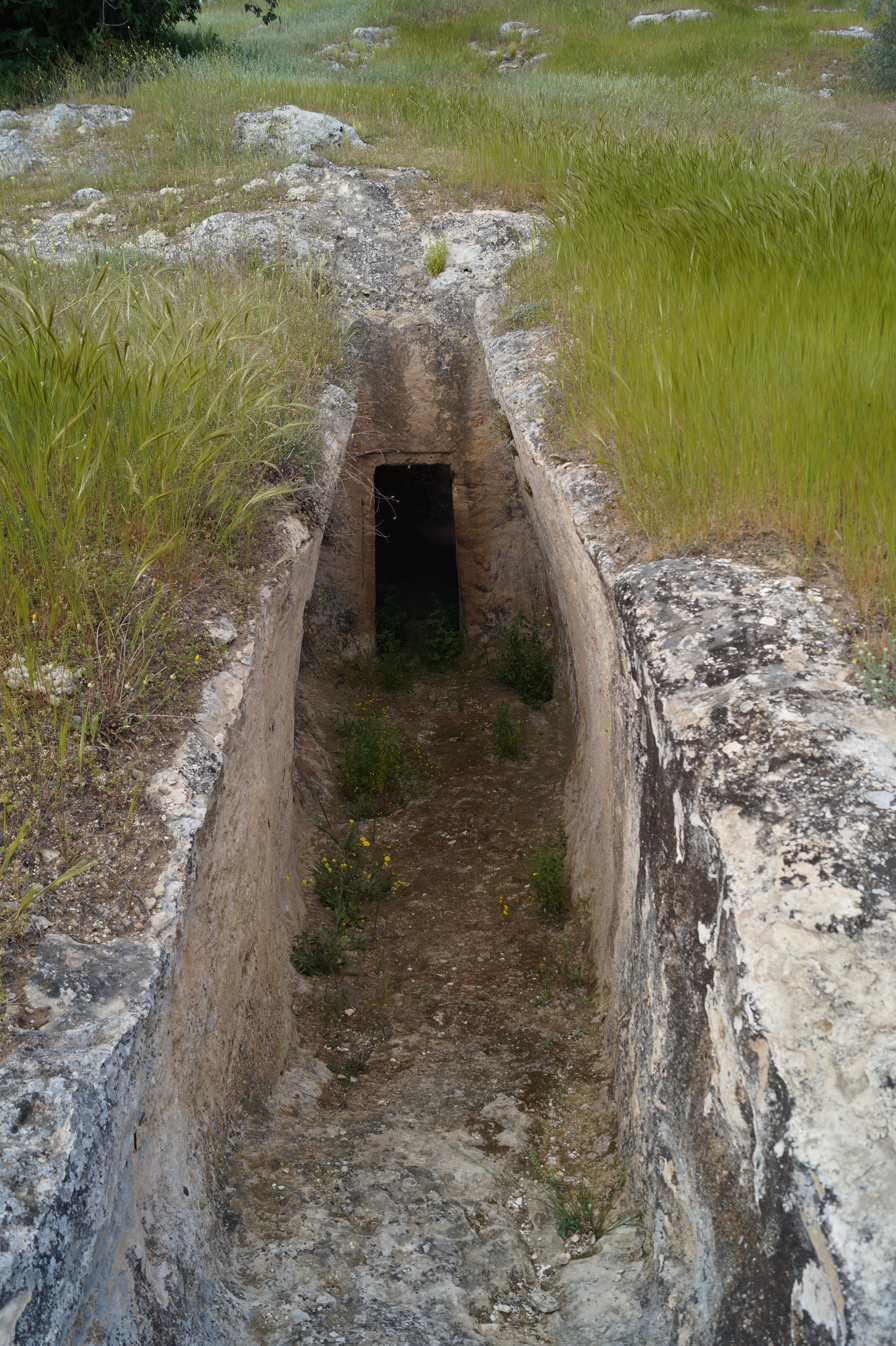
View into chamber tomb 10 at Aidonia, Corinthia, looking down the dromos at the stomion

A Mycenaean chamber tomb is the type of chamber tomb that was built in Mycenaean Greece. Mycenaean chamber tombs originated in Messenia at the end of the Middle Helladic period (c. 1600 BCE), and were built and used throughout the Late Bronze Age across the Aegean area.

Mycenaean chamber tombs were cut into the bedrock (as opposed to the contemporary tholos tombs, which are constructed from masonry), usually on sloping terrain, and formed of a chamber (thalamos), joined to a rectangular passageway (dromos) by a threshold (stomion). The size, elaboration and monumentality of Mycenaean chamber tombs varies considerably, as do the grave goods found within them, suggesting that they were used for the burials of people across a wide range of social strata.

After the end of the Bronze Age, chamber tombs ceased to be constructed in most parts of the Greek world, though some continued in use for votive offerings and hero cult during the Early Iron Age.

== Chronological development ==
The major periods of the Helladic chronology used in this article
| Period | Approximate Date |
|---|---|
| Middle Helladic III | c. 1700 – c. 1600 BCE |
| Late Helladic I | c. 1600 – c. 1450 BCE |
| Late Helladic II | c. 1450 – c. 1400 BCE |
| Late Helladic IIIA | c. 1400 – c. 1300 BCE |
| Late Helladic IIIB | c. 1300 – c. 1180 BCE |
| Late Helladic IIIC | c. 1180 – c. 1050 BCE |

The earliest chamber tombs are found at the end of the Middle Helladic III period (c. 1600 BCE) in Messenia, followed closely by LH I examples throughout central and southern Greece, particularly in the Argolid. They remain relatively uncommon, except at Mycenae, until Late Helladic III, when they were constructed widely across the Aegean region associated with Mycenaean culture.

Chamber tombs continued to be constructed throughout the Mycenaean period, though regional differences are observed as to their popularity and likely social function. At Mycenae, they appear to have displaced all other forms of elite burial, except tholoi, and have been closely linked with the development and consolidation of the palatial state in LH III. Around three hundred chamber tombs are known from the area of Mycenae. It has been suggested that the chamber tombs at Mycenae represent lower-ranked members of the palatial elite, while tholoi were reserved for the most elite, perhaps the wanax and other high-ranking figures known from Linear B. In Boeotia, however, only one tholos tomb is known (the so-called Treasury of Minyas at Orchomenos, dating to c. 1350 BCE), while chamber tombs seem to have been the predominant form of burial for all elite groups, including the monumental chamber tomb at Megalo Kastelli, which has been linked with the rulers of Thebes.

In Achaia, chamber tombs seem to be associated with emergent local elites in the LH II period, but displace even simple grave types, such as pit and cist graves, by LH III. In this period in Achaia, there seems to have been little association, unlike in the Argolid, between social hierarchy and the use of chamber tombs: relatively simple tombs, such as those at Aidonia, with relatively simple grave goods are found alongside monumental examples, such as Tomb 4 at Voundeni – a large LH IIIA chamber tomb with a dromos of 19.8 m (65 ft) and a thalamos 28 m^{2} (300 sq ft) in area, whose extensive and valuable grave goods have led to the scholarly consensus that the single original burial in the tomb represents a local ruler. Rather than carrying a universal meaning, it is likely that the social and symbolic significance of chamber tombs, as well as the nature of the communities using them, varied across the Mycenaean world according to local practices and concerns.

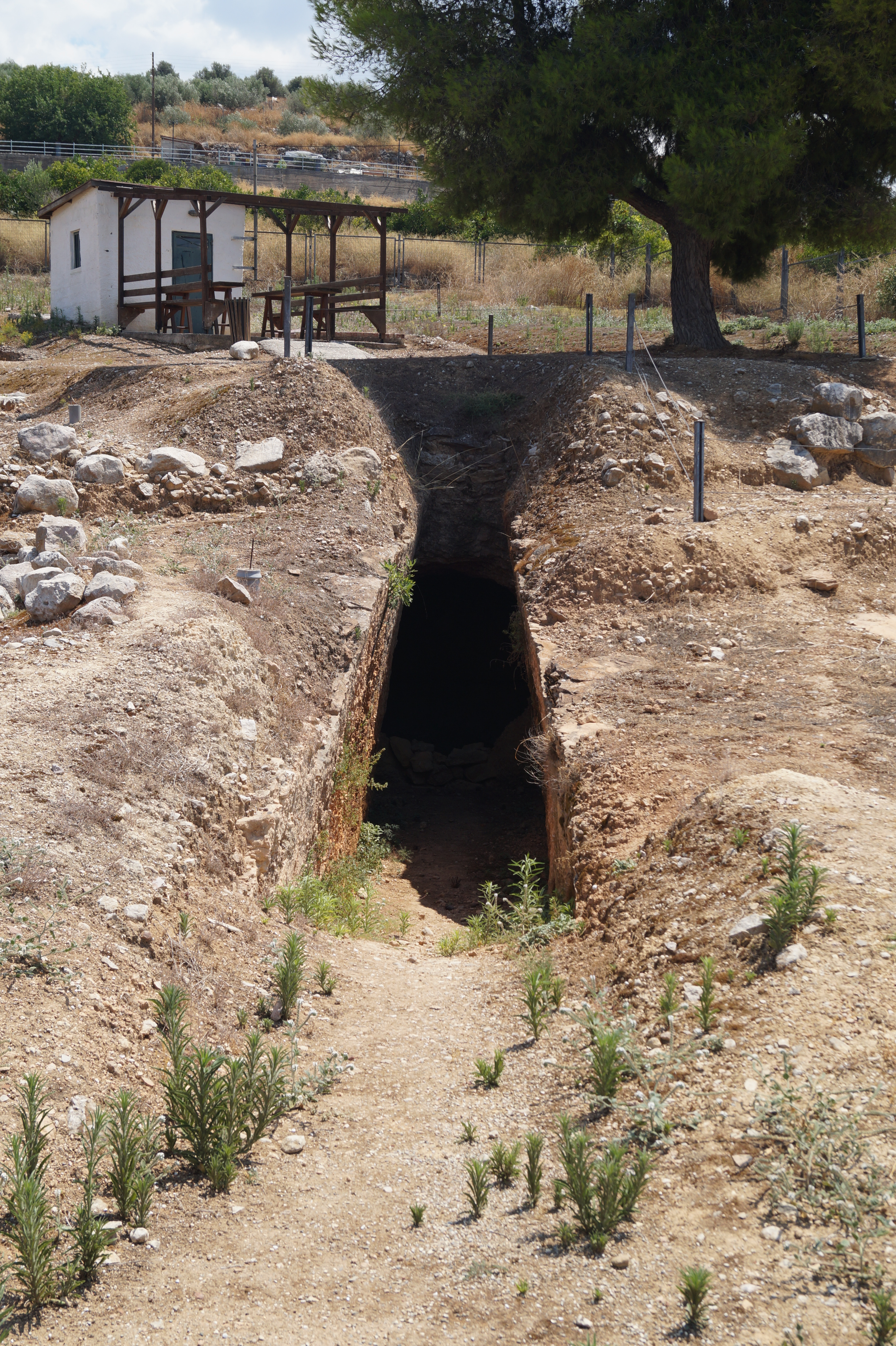
Chamber tomb 16 at Dendra, showing the view of the dromos from outside the tomb

Except in Thessaly and Crete, the construction of chamber tombs ceased after the Late Bronze Age Collapse (c. 1180 BCE), though some examples continued to be re-used for votive offerings, hero cult and occasionally burials during the Early Iron Age. Nearly a third of the chamber tombs excavated by Carl Blegen at Prosymna in the Argolid showed evidence of votive offerings from the Geometric or Archaic periods, and the practice is observed elsewhere in the Greek world between 1050 and 600 BCE, particularly in Messenia, Attica and Boeotia.

== Construction ==
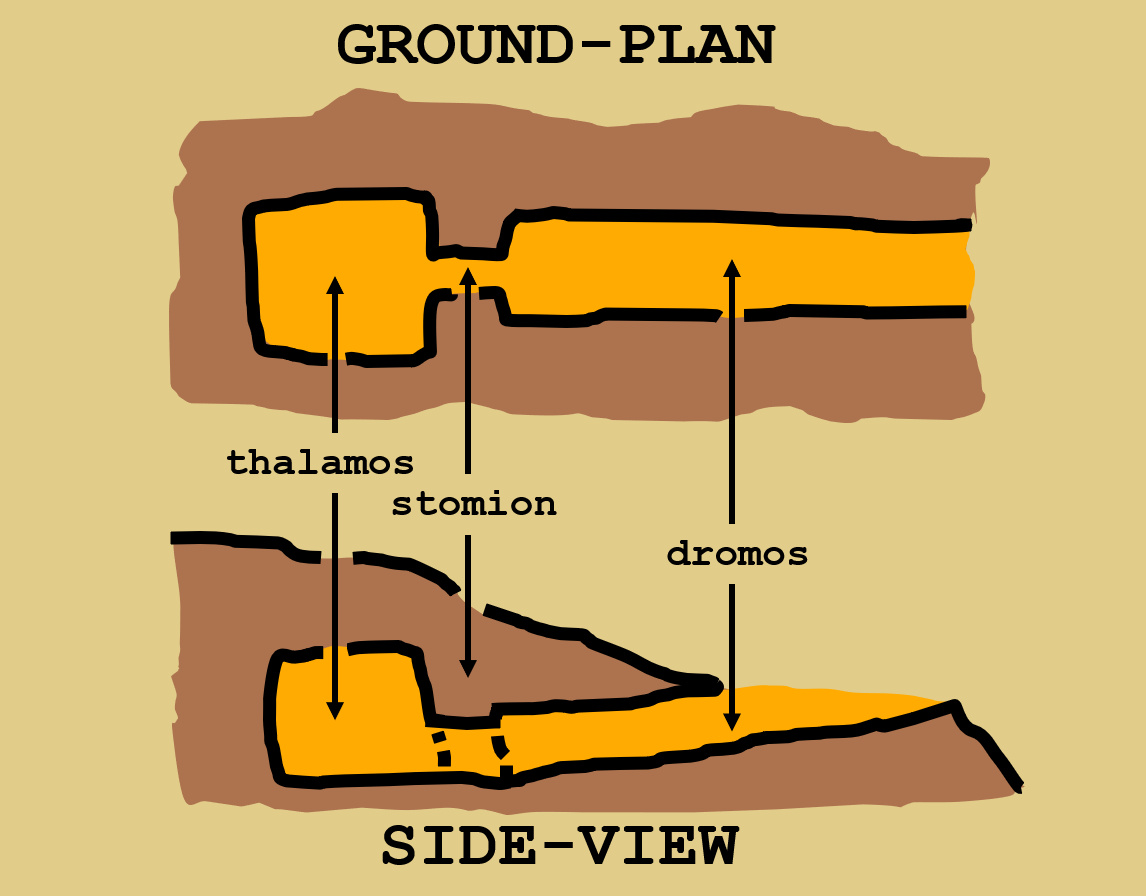
Schematic diagram of a typical chamber tomb, showing division into dromos, stomion and thalamos

Chamber tombs are cut from bedrock and usually divide into a tripartite structure of dromos ('passageway'), stomion ('threshold') and thalamos ('chamber'). Some examples include pits, side chambers or niches into which primary or secondary burials may have been deposited. The division between dromos, stomion and thalamos has been interpreted as the creation of a "boundary zone between the living and the dead". The size, elaboration and monumentality of Mycenaean chamber tombs varies considerably, as do the grave goods found within them, suggesting that they were used for the burials of people across a wide range of social strata.

Scholars debate the relationship in design between chamber tombs and tholoi, which appeared in Greece approximately simultaneously at the end of MH III, and were both first used in Messenia. According to one school of thought, chamber tombs became popular in imitation of tholoi, following the same fundamental form but avoiding the significant expenditure of resources and labour in constructing a tomb from ashlar masonry. Another interpretation sees chamber tombs as a successor to Middle Helladic tumulus burial, developing in parallel with tholoi rather than as an imitation of them.

The specific design of chamber tombs could vary according to local geographic and social considerations. At Thorikos, for instance, so-called "built" chamber tombs of limestone masonry, with short passages approaching one side of the thalamos, were constructed, likely in response to the hard limestone ground, which would have made cutting a long dromos impractical. At Thebes, the so-called "Painted Chamber" tomb has two parallel dromoi, approaching two large chambers, connected by a doorway.

From LH II–IIIA1 onwards, certain monumental chamber tombs had the façade of the stomion, and sometimes the walls of the thalamos, decorated with painted plaster. This phenomenon is particularly known in the Argolid, particularly at Mycenae and Prosymna, but examples are known from elsewhere, including Prosilio 2 and from Thebes. Over the course of the Late Helladic, a trend is observed for the length of the dromos to increase, both in absolute measurement and relative to the size of the thalamos. Tomb 505 at Mycenae, for example, has a dromos over 35 m (115 ft) in length. This may be associated with an increasing desire to show wealth and power through a large, impressive tomb, or may reflect the growing importance of the dromos in funerary ritual. At the end of the period, however, in LH IIIC, the opposite trend is observed: dromoi become shorter and less attention appears to be paid to the carving and decoration of the façade of the stomion, perhaps indicating the declining importance of any rituals that took place there.

So-called "built" chamber tombs, such as those at Thorikos and other examples at sites including Marathon, Portes and Mitrou, are similarly cut from rock but include masonry on the interior. These appear earlier than true chamber tombs, often lack a dromos, and may have developed separately.

== Funerary practices ==
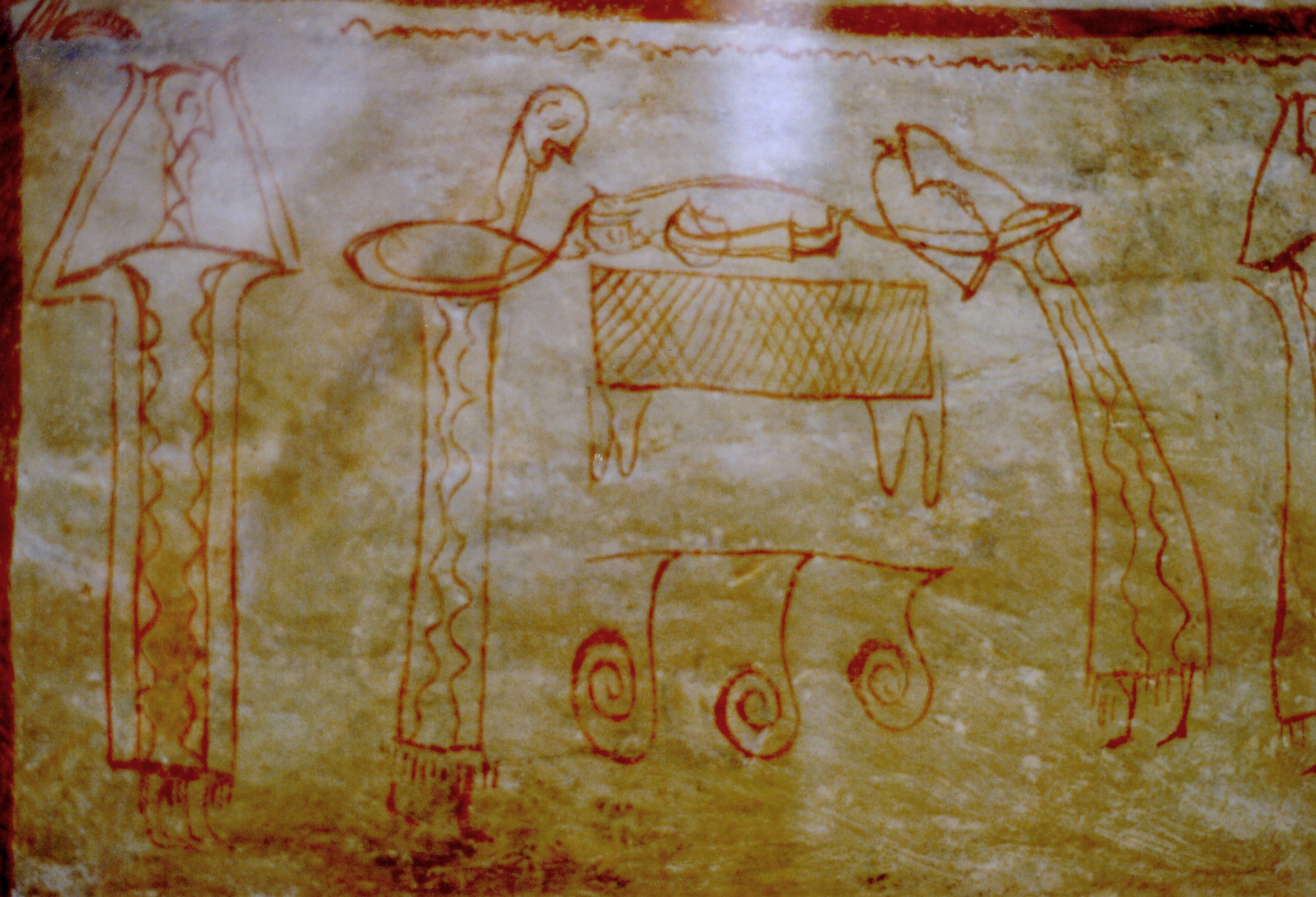
A funerary scene of lamentation over a child's body, painted on a larnax from Tanagra, LH III

Chamber tombs were generally used for multiple burial and re-used over multiple generations. Work at Ayia Sotira in the Nemea valley has highlighted the efforts made by those using the tombs to carry on re-using them, even when the tomb had partially collapsed and doing so was difficult. The tombs are often assumed to have been used for members of the same family, though solid evidence is lacking as to the precise kinship between people buried in the same tomb.

There is tentative evidence for funerary processions towards Mycenaean chamber tombs; it has therefore often been assumed that the body would be transported to the tomb on a wheeled vehicle, though the location of some cemeteries around Mycenae indicates that at least the final part of this procession must sometimes have taken part on foot.

Almost all Mycenaean burials in chamber tombs, particularly before LH IIIC, are inhumations rather than cremations, though post-Mycenaean cremation burials are sometimes found in the upper levels of the dromoi of Mycenaean tombs. In most parts of the Aegean world, bodies were laid on the floor of the thalamos, sometimes in pits dug into it or a side chamber. At Tanagra in Boeotia, however, it was common to inter the body within a larnax, a practice only otherwise attested on Minoan Crete. It was common for previous burials to be rearranged, relocated and perhaps sometimes removed when a tomb was re-opened for a later interment. The burials of children were often made in small niches in the wall of the dromos.

It was common for grave goods to be deposited in chamber tombs: these usually included ceramics, but could vary considerably based on the social status of the deceased. While most of the grave goods in the Aidonia tombs were relatively modest, for example, Tomb 2 at Prosilio in Boeotia included weaponry, gold and faience jewellery, and a signet ring. Fragments of kylikes are routinely found in the dromoi and sometimes thalamoi of tombs, suggesting that libations or drinking may have played a role in the funerary ritual, while it is also common to find animal bones and the remains of food production, either for consumption at the tomb or perhaps as an offering to the dead.

After a burial in the thalamos, the stomion would be sealed, often with a dry-stone wall: it is possible that the un-sealing of this barrier for further burials or offerings carried significant ritual significance. Tombs were generally filled with earth shortly after use, and not generally marked above ground: only a few examples of tomb markers are known, though it has been hypothesised that some may have been marked by wooden stelai. After the end of the Bronze Age, chamber tombs ceased to be constructed in most parts of the Greek world, though some continued in use for votive offerings and hero cult during the Early Iron Age.

== Gallery ==
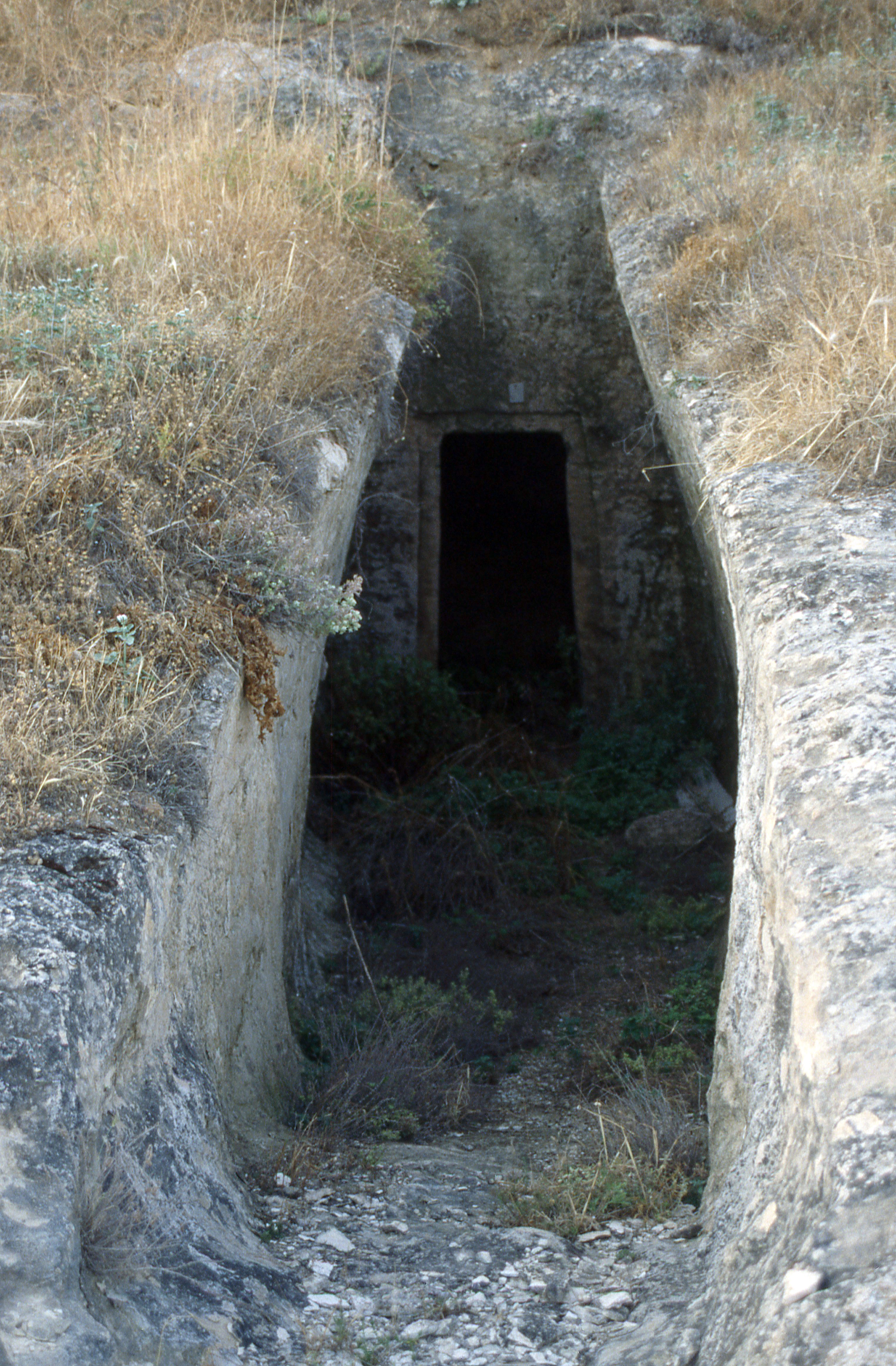
A chamber tomb at Aidonia in the Corinthia

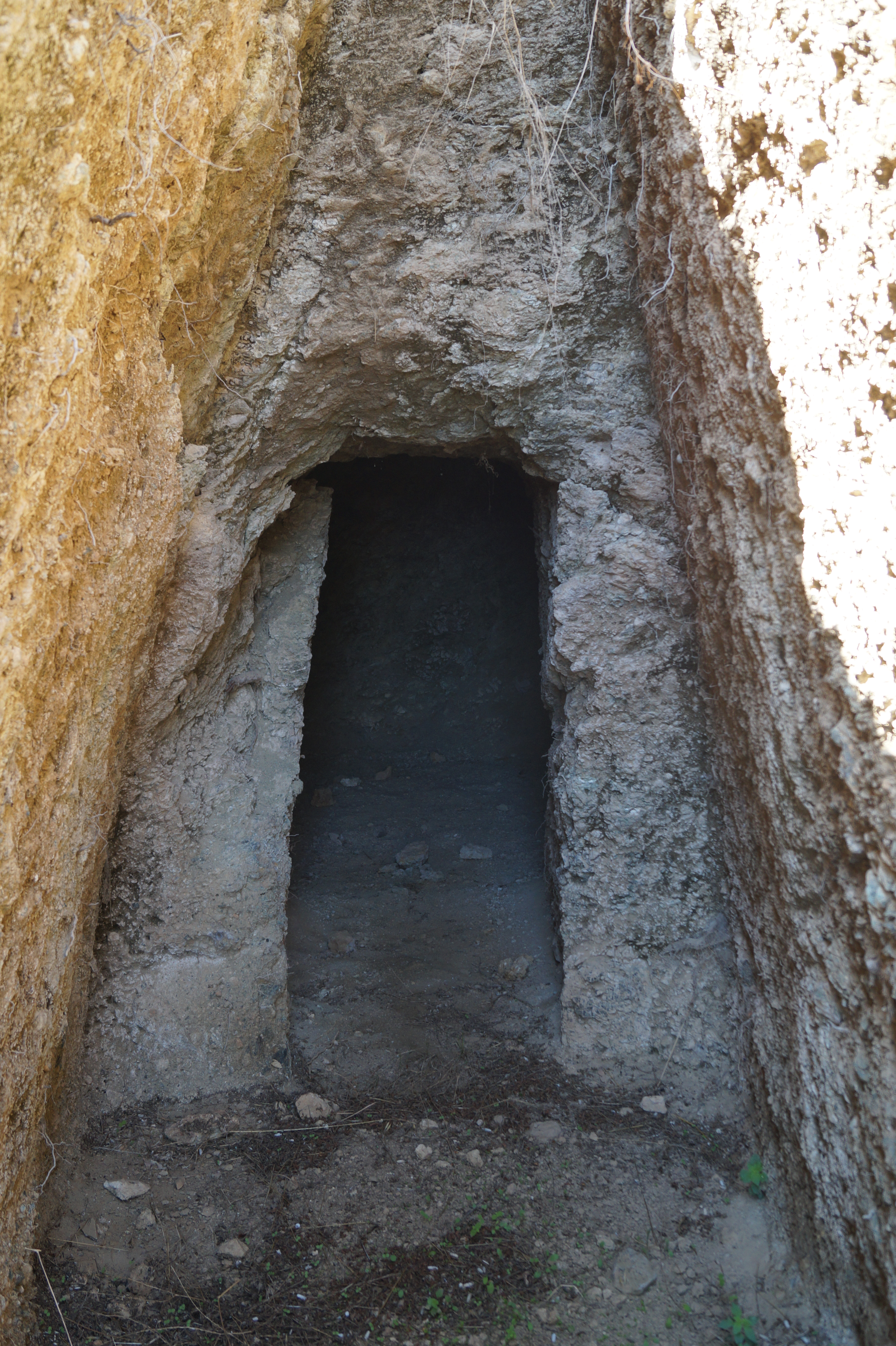
The stomion of chamber tomb A at Palaia Epidavros in the Argolid, viewed from the dromos

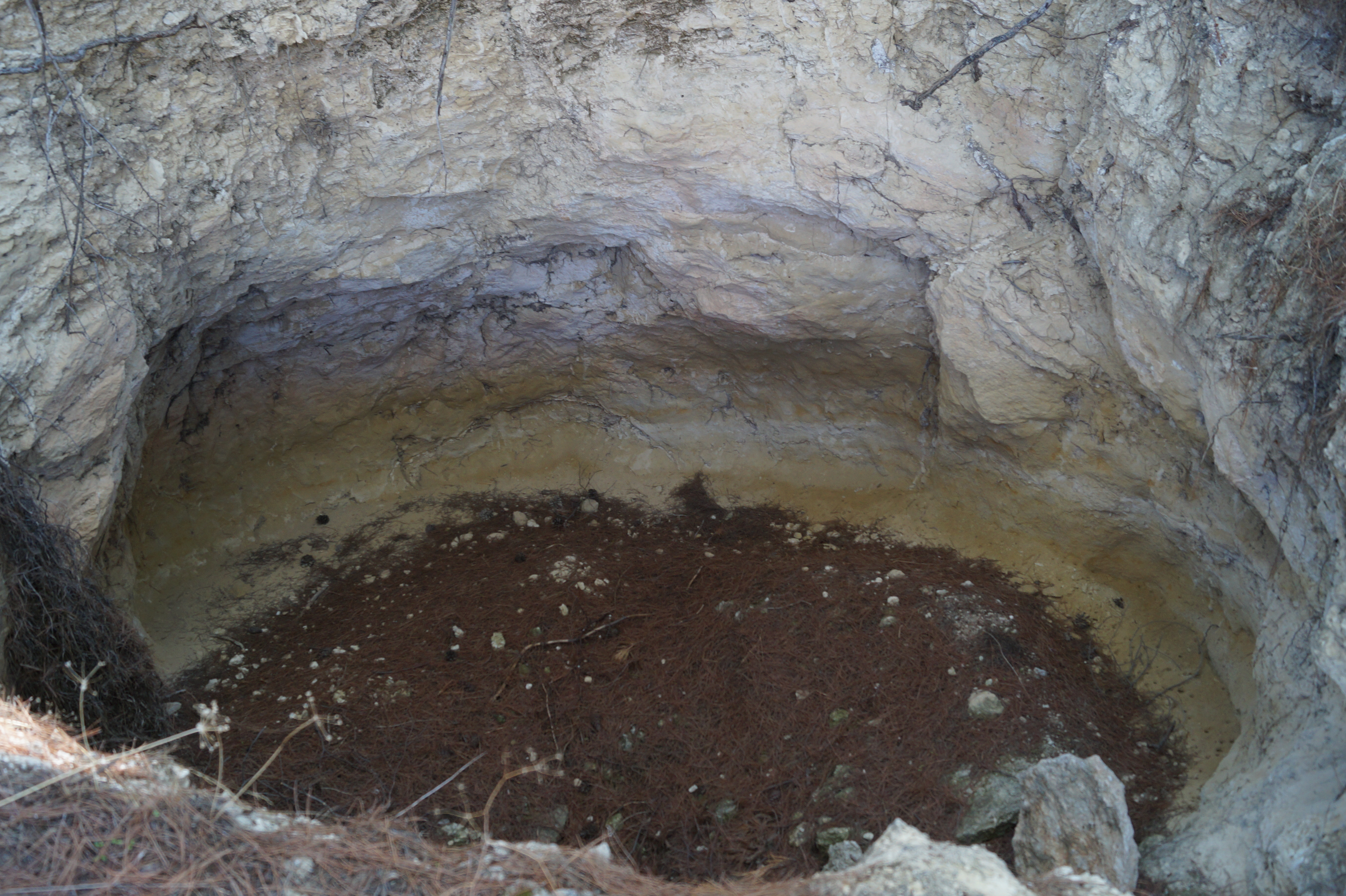
The thalamos of chamber tomb 14 at Kato Almyri, Corinthia

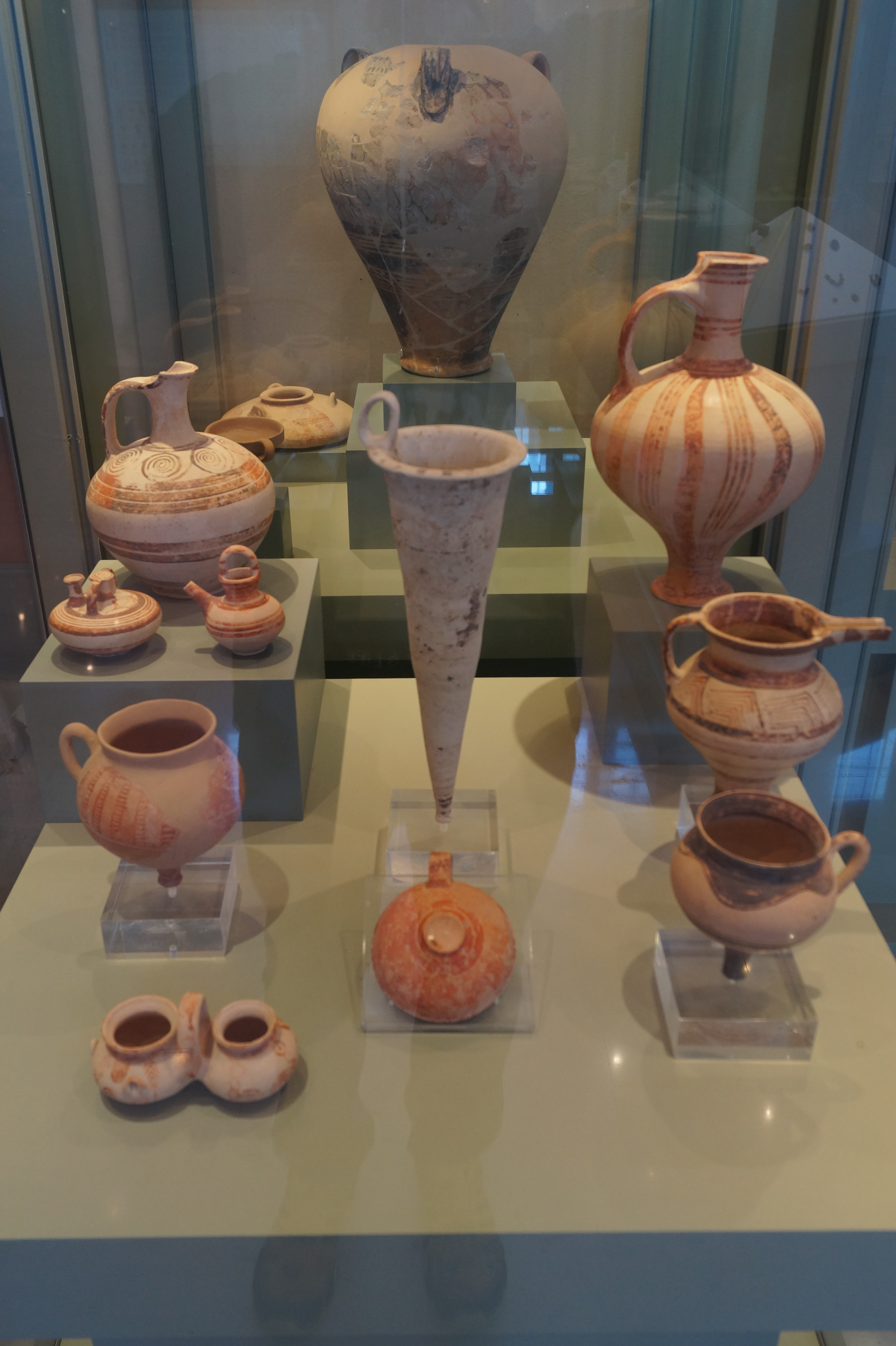
Ceramic finds from chamber tombs 10 and 11 at Aidonia

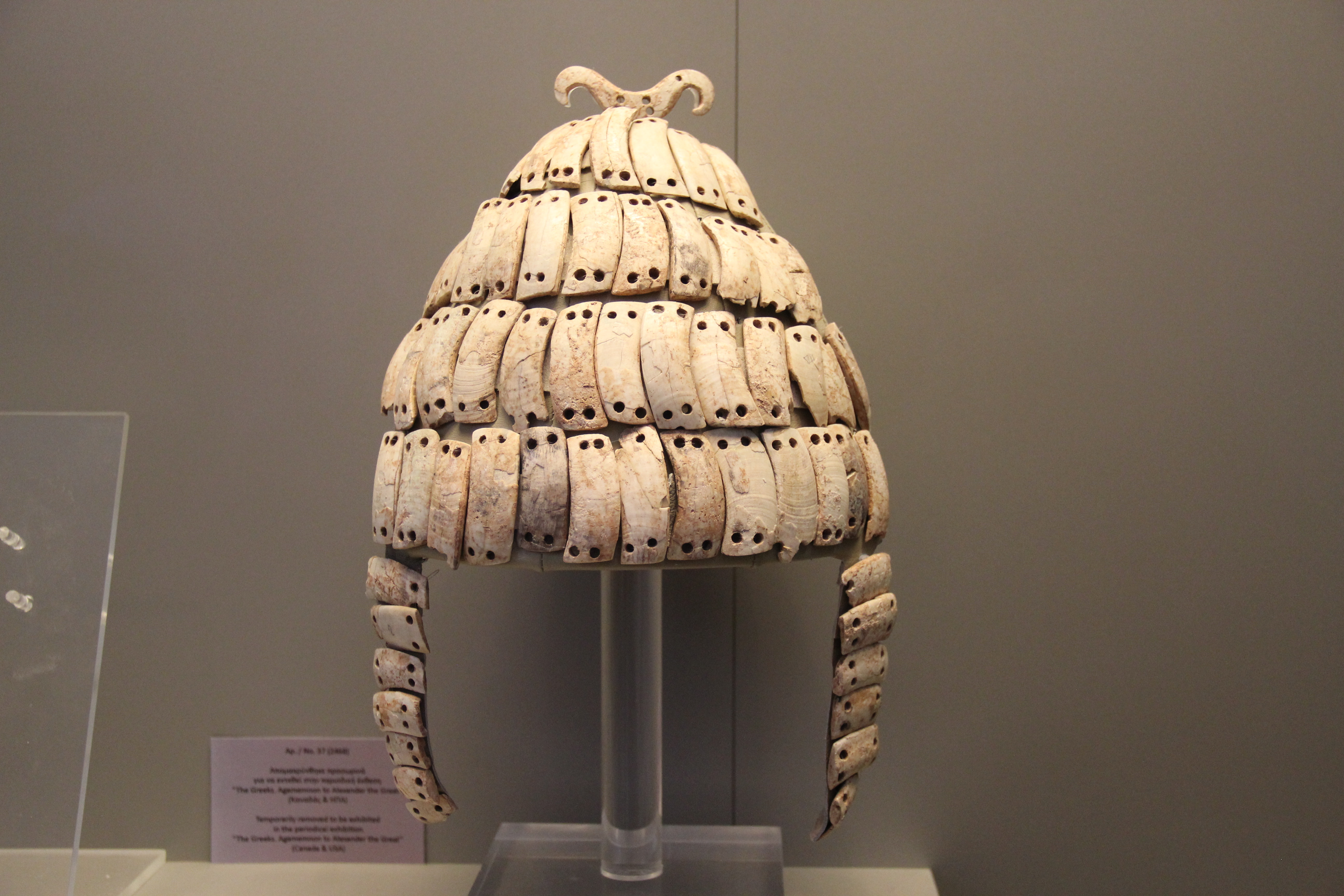
A boar's tusk helmet found in chamber tomb 515 at Mycenae

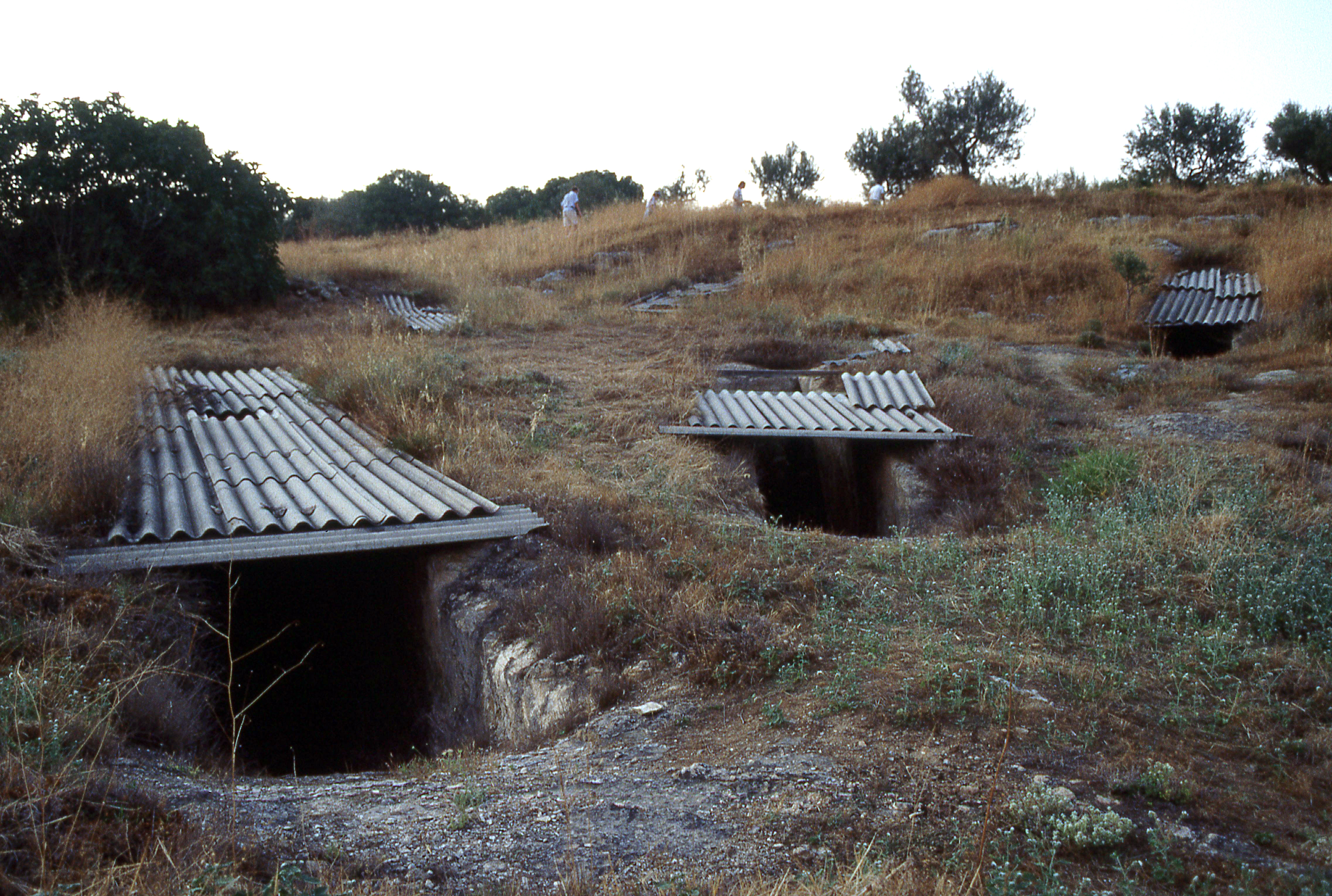
Chamber tombs at Aidonia, with corrugated iron sheets to protect the dromoi from erosion

== See also ==
- Mycenaean shaft tombs
- Tholoi

== Bibliography ==
- Antonaccio, Carla (1994). "Contesting the Past: Hero Cult, Tomb Cult, and Epic in Early Greece". American Journal of Archaeology. 98 (3): 389–410. doi:10.2307/506436. JSTOR 506436. S2CID 192969382.
- Arena, Emiliano (2015). "Mycenaean Peripheries during the Palatial Age: The Case of Achaia". Hesperia. 84 (1): 1–46. doi:10.2972/hesperia.84.1.0001. S2CID 164407730.
- Bennet, John (2017). "Prosilio – 2017". Archaeology in Greece Online. Archived from the original on 2022-11-30.
- Blegen, Carl (1937). "Post-Mycenaean Deposits in Chamber-Tombs". Αρχαιολογικὴ 'Εφηµερίς: 377–390.
- Boyd, Michael (2006). "Review: The Mycenaean Cult of the Dead. British Archaeological Reports International Series 1372". Bryn Mawr Classical Review.
- Boyd, Michael (2014). "The Development of the Bronze Age Funerary Landscape of Nichoria". In Nakassis, Dimitri; Gulizio, Joann; James, Sarah A. (eds.). KE-RA-ME-JA: Studies Presented to Cynthia W. Shelmerdine. Philadelphia: INSTAP Academic Press. pp. 191–208. ISBN 9781931534765.
- Boyd, Michael (2016). "Fields of Action in Mycenaean Funerary Practices". In Dakouri-Hild, Anastasia; Boyd, Michael (eds.). Staging Death: Funerary Performance, Architecture and Landscape in the Aegean. De Gruyter. pp. 57–87. ISBN 9783110475784.
- Castleden, Rodney (2005). The Mycenaeans. London and New York: Routledge. ISBN 0415363365 – via Google Books.
- Cavanagh, William (1987). "Cluster analysis of Mycenaean chamber tombs". In Laffineur, Robert (ed.). Thanatos: Les coutumes funéraires en Egée à l' âge du Bronze. Actes du colloque de Liège (21–23 avril 1986), Aegaeum 1. Liège. pp. 161–169.
- Cavanagh, William; Mee, Christopher (1998). A Private Place: Death in Prehistoric Greece. SIMA 125. Jonsered: Paul Aströms Forlag.
- Deger-Jalkotzy, Sigrid (2013). "Cremation Burials in the Mycenaean Cemetery of Elateia-Alonaki in Central Greece". In Lochner, Michaela; Ruppenstein, Florian (eds.). Cremation burials in the region between the Middle Danube and the Aegean, 1300–750 BC. Vienna. pp. 221–229.
- Efkleidou, Kalliopi (2019). "Walking your Way to Death: Exploring the Relation Between the Location of Mycenaean Chamber Tombs and Roads in the Argolid". Open Archaeology. 5: 484–504. doi:10.1515/opar-2019-0030. S2CID 210074181.
- Galanakis, Yannis (2018). "Review: Ayia Sotira: A Mycenaean Chamber Tomb Cemetery in the Nemea Valley, Greece Prehistory Monographs 56 ". Bryn Mawr Classical Review.
- Galanakis, Yannis (2021). "Ma(r)king Places: The Monumental Mortuary Landscapes of Early Mycenaean Greece". In Eder, Birgitta; Zavadil, Michaela (eds.). (Social) Place and Space in Early Mycenaean Greece: international Discussions in Mycenaean Archaeology, October 5–8, 2016, Athens. Vienna. pp. 595–616.
- Gallou, Chrysanthi (2003). The Cult of the Dead in Central Greece During the Mycenaean Period (PDF) (Ph.D.).
- Gallou, Chrysanthi (2005). The Mycenaean Cult of the Dead. British Archaeological Reports International Series. Vol. 1372. Oxford: Archaeopress.
- Hope Simpson, Richard; Dickinson, Oliver (1979). A Gazetteer of Aegean Civilisation in the Bronze Age 1: The Mainland and Islands. SIMA. Vol. 52. Göteborg.
- Mee, Christopher; Cavanagh, William (1984). "Mycenaean Tombs as Evidence for Social and Political Organisation". Oxford Journal of Archaeology. 3 (3): 45–64. doi:10.1111/j.1468-0092.1984.tb00121.x.
- Papadimitriou, Nikolas (2015). "The Formation and Use of Dromoi in Early Mycenaean Tombs". Annual of the British School at Athens. 110: 71–120. doi:10.1017/S0068245415000052. S2CID 193590796.
- Rutter, Jeremy (2012). "Lesson 21: Narrative: Mycenaean Public and Funerary Architecture: Fortifications, Drainage Projects, Roads and Chamber Tombs". Aegean Prehistoric Archaeology. Dartmouth College.
- Shelmerdine, Cynthia (2008). "Introduction: Background, Methods and Sources". In Shelmerdine, Cynthia (ed.). The Cambridge Companion to the Aegean Bronze Age. Cambridge University Press. pp. 1–18.
- Smith, Angus; Dabney, Mary; Pappi, Evangelia; Triantaphyllou, Sevasti; Wright, James (2017). Ayia Sotira. A Mycenaean Chamber Tomb Cemetery in the Nemea Valley, Greece. Prehistory Monographs. Vol. 56. Philadelphia: INSTAP Academic Press.
- Vlachopoulos, Andreas (2020). "Wall Paintings". In Kotsonas, Antonis; Lemnos, Irene S. (eds.). A Companion to the Archaeology of Early Greece and the Mediterranean: Volume 2. Oxford: Archaeopress. pp. 407–433.
- Wace, Alan J. (1932). Chamber Tombs at Mycenae. Oxford.
- Wright, James C. (2008). "Chamber Tombs, Family and State in Mycenaean Greece". In Gallou, Chrysanthi; Georgiadis, M.; Muskett, G. M. (eds.). DIOSKOUROI: Studies Presented to W. G. Cavanagh and C. B. Mee on the Anniversary of their 30-year Joint Contribution to Aegean Archaeology. Oxford: Archaeopress. pp. 144–153.
