= Agrionius =

Ancient Greek mythological epithet

Agrionius (Ancient Greek: Ἀγριώνιος) was an epithet of the Greek god Dionysus, under which he was worshiped at Orchomenus in Boeotia, and from which his festival, the Agrionia, in that place derived its name. The epithet itself means "fierce", and is derived from a Greek root word indicating things relating to the wild. It is thought to represent Dionysus' fondness for savagery and savage beasts.
