= 9th-century Byzantine domes =

Timber-roofed basilicas, which had been the standard form until the 6th century, would be displaced by domed churches from the 9th century onward. In the Middle Byzantine period (c. 843 – 1204), domes were normally built to emphasize separate functional spaces, rather than as the modular ceiling units they had been earlier. The cross-in-square plan, with a single dome at the crossing or five domes in a quincunx pattern, became widely popular in the Middle Byzantine period. Resting domes on circular or polygonal drums pierced with windows eventually became the standard style, with regional characteristics.

A central image of Christ begins to be used in domes from the late 9th or early 10th centuries, although it is not described as an image of Christ Pantocrator, instead being described as "he who oversees the earth, he who is governor of all, or he who is the universal king".

== Venice ==
Venice's architecture was a blend of Byzantine and northern Italian influences, although nothing from the ninth and tenth centuries has survived except the foundations of the first St. Mark's Basilica. This building was presumably similar to Justinian's Church of the Holy Apostles based on its layout, but how it was roofed is unknown.

== Turkey ==
The early 9th century church in Tirilye now called the Fatih Mosque, was a cross-in-square building.

== Greece ==
Other cross-in-square examples from the 9th century include the church of Episkopē in Evrytania, Panagia Skripou Monastery, A. Dēmētrios tou Katsourē in Arta, and the Church of Saint Andrew in Peristera, Thessaloniki. The church now called Atik Mustafa Pasha Mosque in Constantinople was built at the end of the 9th century. A number of sub-types emerged over the centuries that have been variously classified by floor plan and dome support system.

== Constantinople ==
The Nea Ekklesia of Emperor Basil I was built in Constantinople around 880 as part of a substantial building renovation and construction program during his reign. It had five domes, which are known from literary sources, but different arrangements for them have been proposed under at least four different plans. One has the domes arranged in a cruciform pattern like those of the contemporaneous Church of St. Andrew at Peristerai or the much older Church of the Holy Apostles in Constantinople. Others arrange them in a quincunx pattern, with four minor domes in the corners of a square and a larger fifth in the center, as part of a cross-domed or cross-in-square plan. That the church was dedicated to five patrons (Christ, the Theotokos, St. Nicholas, the Prophet Elijah, and the Archangel Gabriel, later changed to the Archangel Michael under Leo VI the Wise) suggests that the five domes covered separate liturgical spaces. It is often suggested that the five-domed design of St. Panteleimon at Nerezi, from 1164, is based on that of the Nea Ekklesia.

The Pentacubiculum at the Imperial Palace in Constantinople was either built by Basil I or restored by him. It was a tetraconch plan with what may have been a domed central space.

Leo VI built a church dedicated to St Demetrius on the grounds of the Great Palace. It was described by a mid-10th century court official named Gregory as having four columns, vaults decorated with mosaics of a starry sky, and a central dome depicting Christ "emerging from the sky as the sun". It may have been one of the earliest cross-in-square churches in Constantinople.

A 15th-century account of a Russian traveler to Constantinople mentions an abandoned hall from the reign of Leo VI, presumably domed, "in which the sun, the moon, and the stars succeeded each other as in heaven."

== Cyprus ==
Single and multi-domed basilicas on Cyprus proposed to date from the ninth or tenth centuries include the Church of Saint Photios of Gialousa (Karpasia), the Church of Saint George of Afentrika (Karpasia), the Monastery of Saint Barnabas (Salamis), the Church of Saint Paraskeva (Geroskipou), and the Church of Saints Hilarion and Barnabas (Peristerona).

== See also ==
- List of Roman domes
- History of architecture
