= Phylaki =

Village and ancient site in Crete

Phylaki is a modern village and the archaeological site of an ancient Minoan cemetery on Crete.

== Archaeology ==
The site, discovered in 1981, is a Late Minoan IIIA tholos tomb. At least 9 burials were made here.

Artefacts found included a gold necklace which contained 28 rosettes of gold, fifteen seal stones, amulets, bronze weapons and bronze utensils. Ivory decorations from a wooden box include: the heads of warriors in boar's tusk helmets, Plaques found are decorated with wild goats, sphinxes and "figure of eight" shields.

This area was used as a dump site for the town, which may have preserved it from damage to the smaller items that were hidden under the trash and animal bodies.
