= Eurybotadas =

Eurybotadas was the son of Tallus, from Orchomenus (Boeotia). He served as a member of Alexander's allied cavalry until the campaign reached Ecbatana in 330 BC. There he and his compatriots were discharged. On their return 329 BC, they made a dedication to Zeus Soter in Orchomenus.
