= Hagia Photia =

Archaeological site on Crete

Coordinates: 35°11′45.4″N 26°08′52.1″E

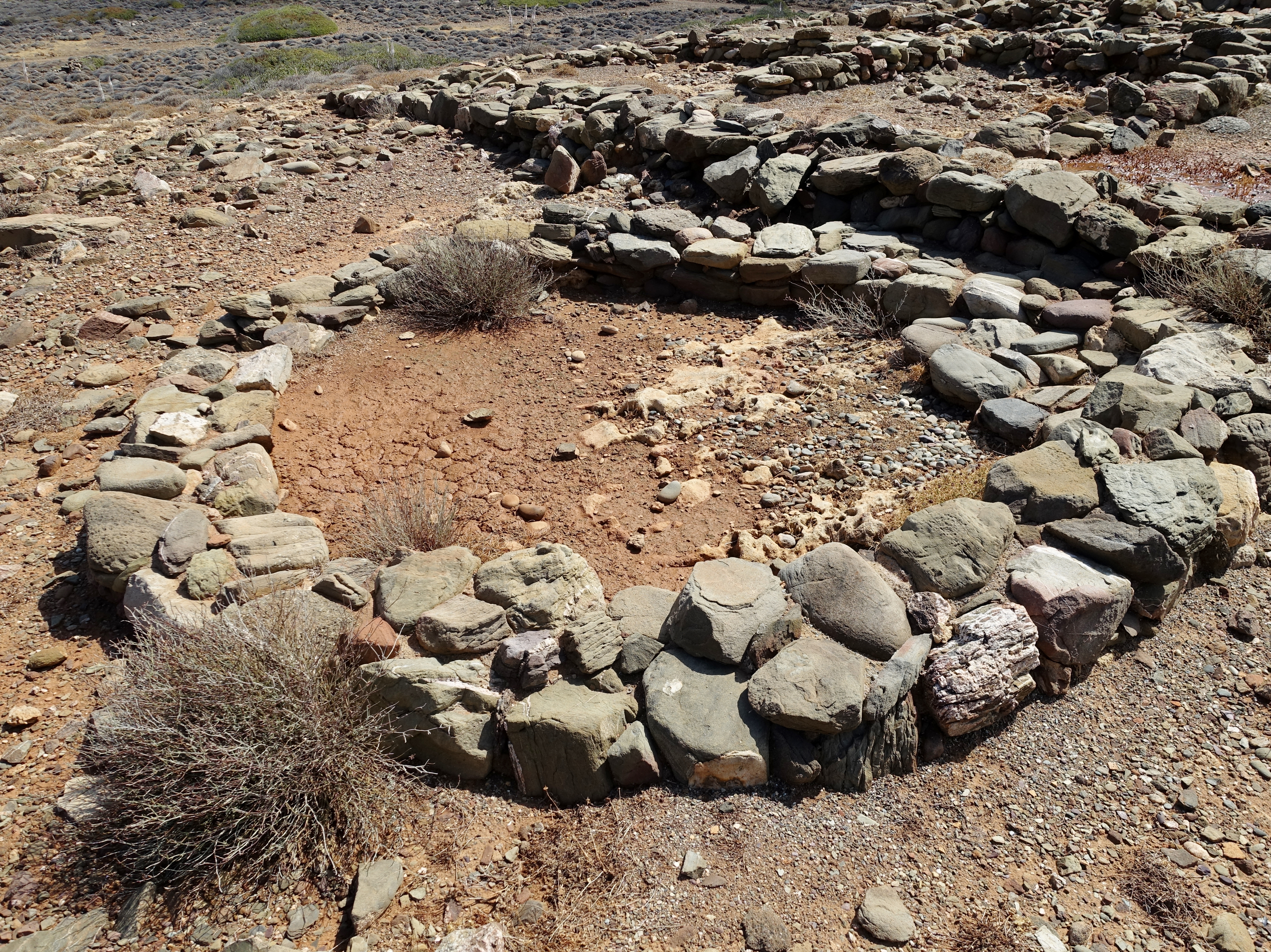
Agia Photia Archaeological Site

Hagia Photia (also Ayia Photia, Agia Photia, Greek: Αγιά Φωτιά) is an archaeological site of a fortified ancient Minoan building on eastern Crete. Sitia lies five kilometers to the west.

== Archaeology ==
The building at Hagia Photia has 37 rooms that open onto a central court, but which do not necessarily connect to adjoining rooms. It was originally built in the Middle Minoan period with a surrounding fortification wall. The fortifications are important to note, as so few Minoan settlements have evidence of city walls. Other fortified Minoan settlements are from the Pre-Palatial period, but Hagia Photia is of the Old Palatial period. Three apsidal buttresses along the north wall (which faces the sea) and a fourth at the southwest corner of the outer wall are similar to the buttresses on fortification walls at Lerna in the Argolid subregion and Chalandriani cemetery on the Island of Syros.

The site was abandoned, and circular structures were built over its ruins. The structures might be tholos tombs, and they would be the most northerly and most easterly tombs of their kind on the island. Many of the grave goods here are Cycladic, and they may indicate that Hagia Photia was a Cycladic colony.

Two Kouphota hill caves (which face the sea) contain Neolithic, Pre-Palatial, and Old Palance period remnants.

150 metres (160 yd) to the east, a Minoan cemetery, Glyphada, has been excavated with over 250 Minoan chamber tombs.

Finds excavated from Hagia Photia are at the Archaeological Museum of Sitia and the Agios Nikolaos, Crete, Museum.
