= Pyrgos, Boeotia =

Pyrgos Πύργος
- Community
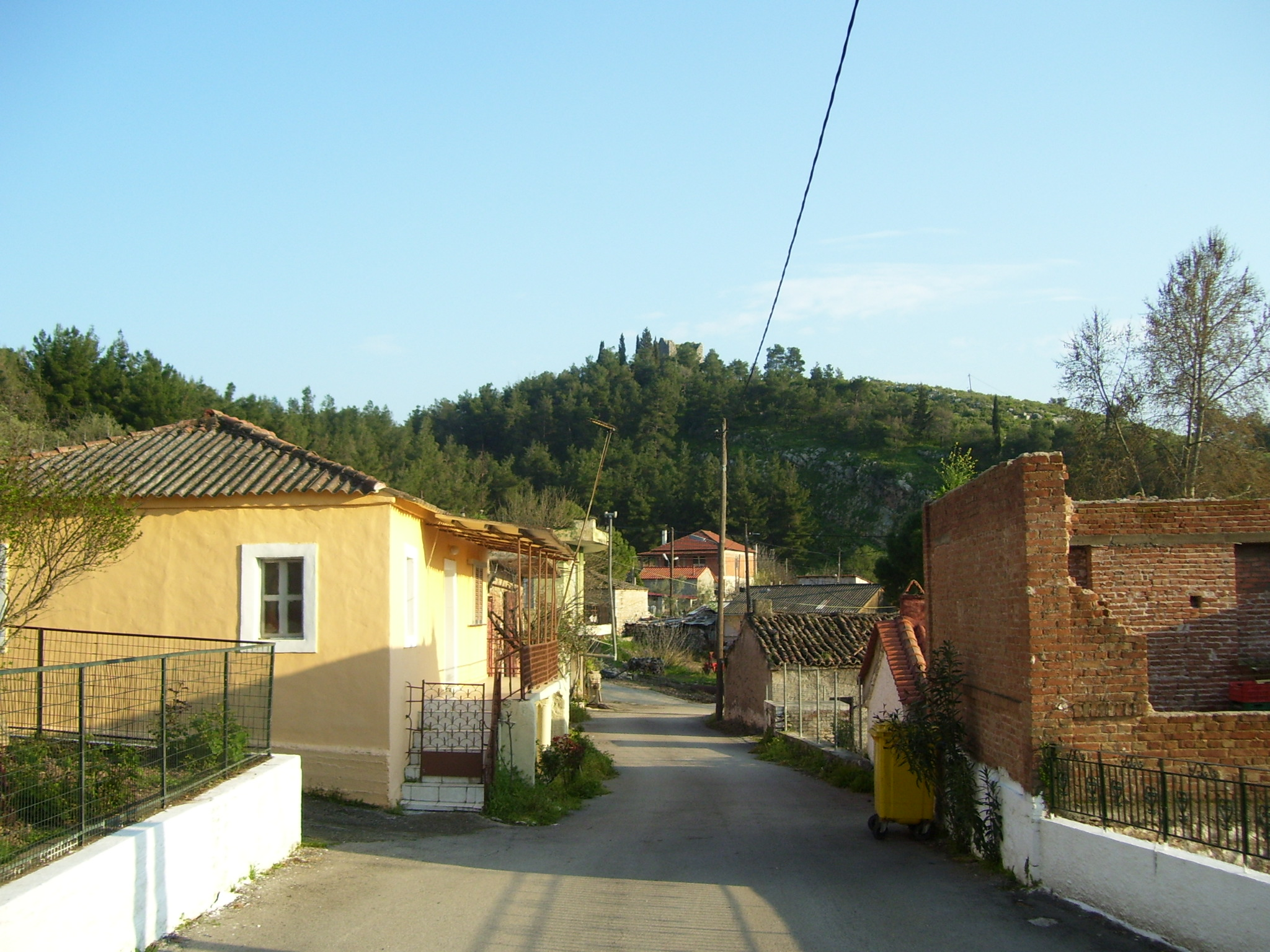
- View of the village, with the tower hill in the background

- Location within Greece
- Coordinates: 38°30′56″N 23°02′04″E
- Country: Greece
- Administrative region: Central Greece
- Regional unit: Boeotia
- Municipality: Orchomenus
- Municipal unit: Orchomenus

Population (2021)
  - Community: 53
- Time zone: UTC+2 (EET)
  - Summer (DST): UTC+3 (EEST)

Pyrgos (Greek: Πύργος Βοιωτίας) is a small village in Boeotia, possible site of Homeric Nisa (Iliad 2.508). It is named after a ruined medieval tower, with a notable Mycenaean element, that overlooks the village from a nearby hill. The hill is dedicated to Agia Marina Pyrgos, or St. Marina of Pyrgos. The town forms part of the municipality of Orchomenos.

Population
Year	1940	1951	1961	1971	1981	1991	2001
Inhabitants	317	382	292	249	210	205	221
