= Beehive tomb =

Burial structure

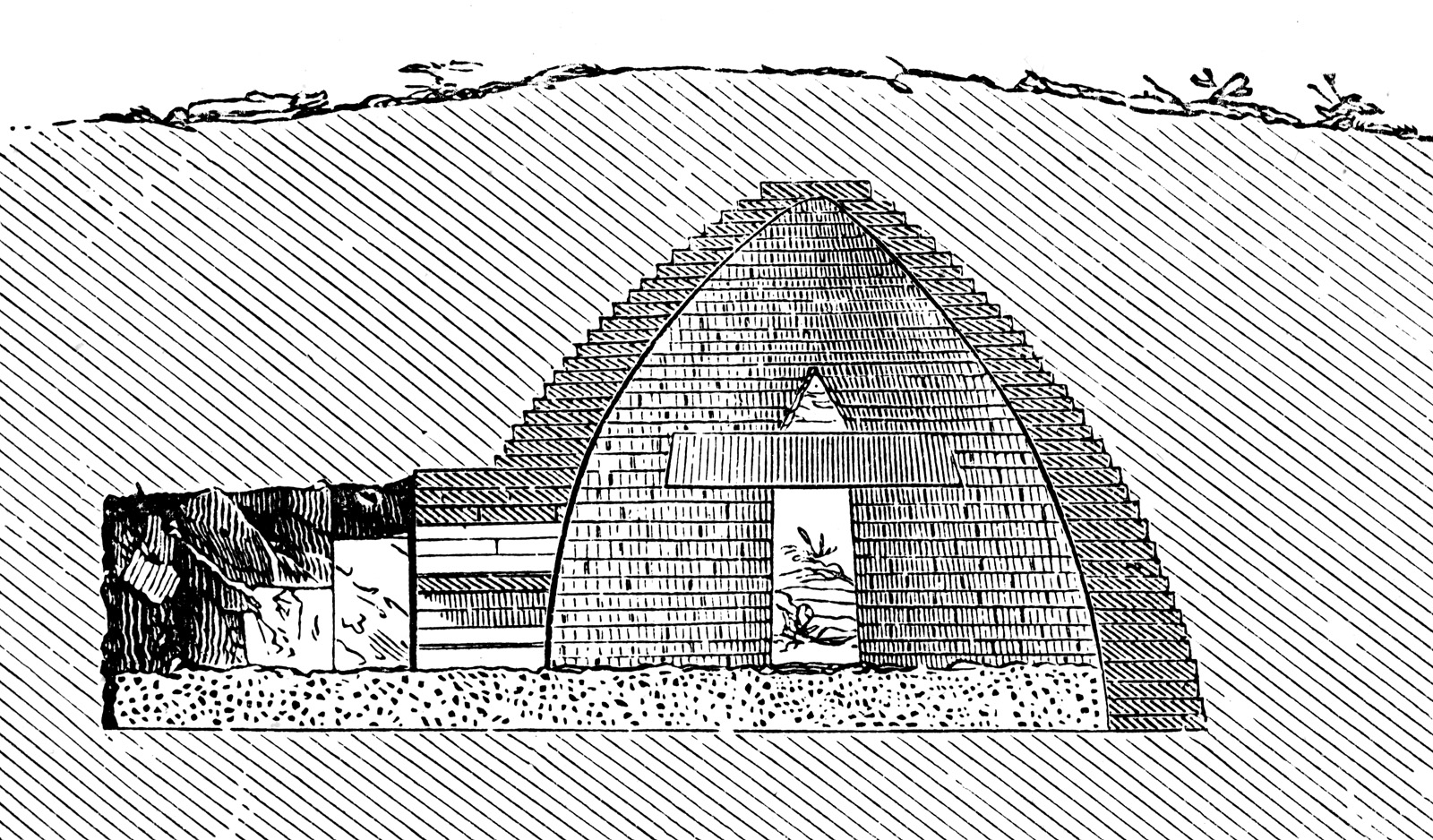
Cross section of Treasury of Atreus, a beehive tomb at Mycenae

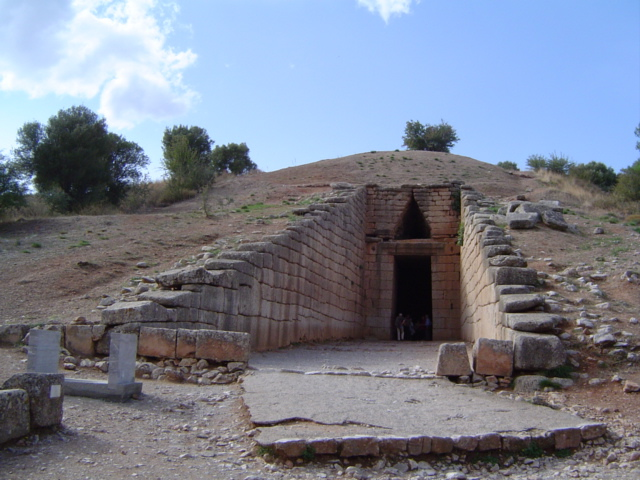
Dromos entrance to the Treasury of Atreus

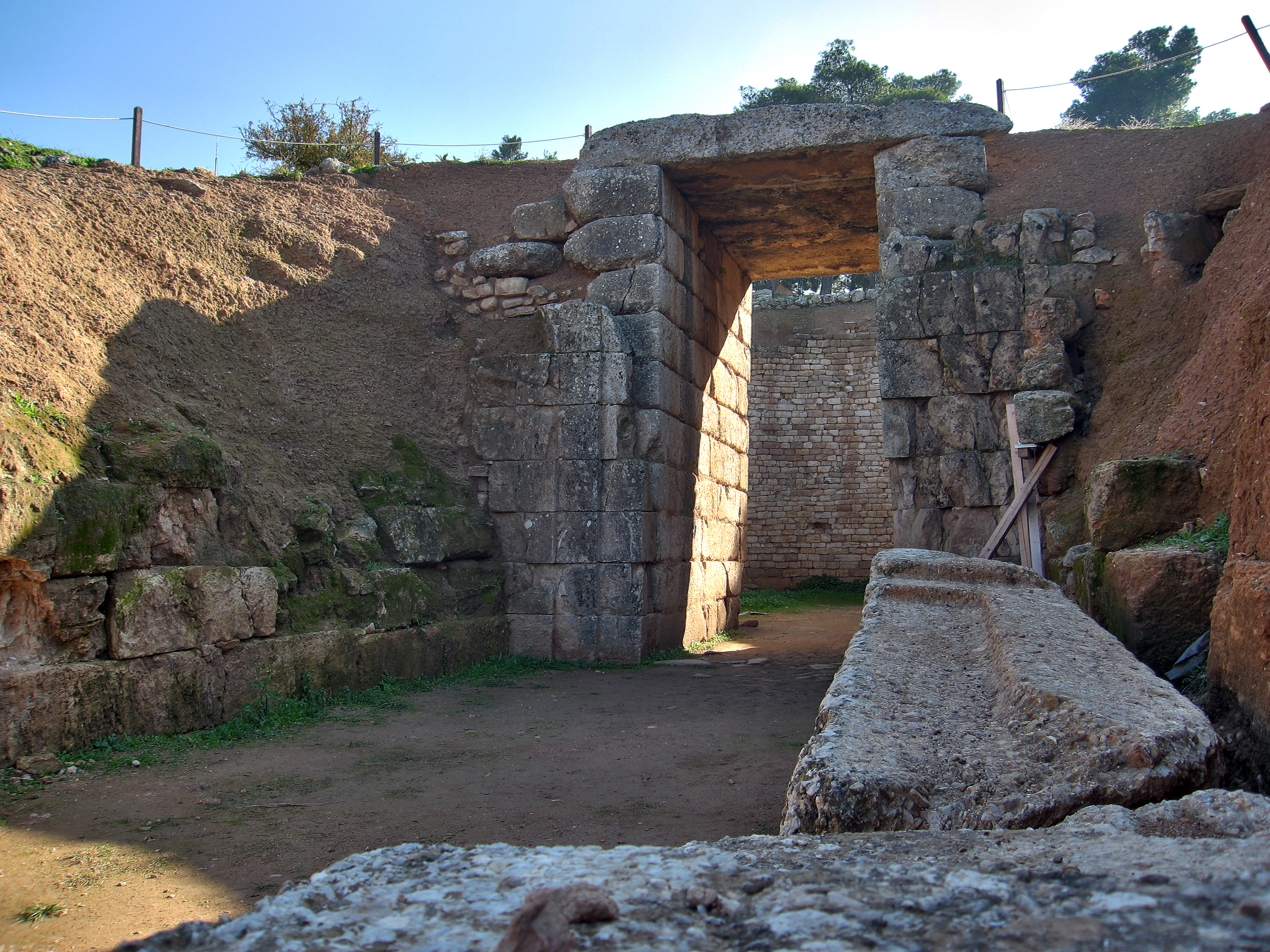
The Lion Tholos Tomb at Mycenae. Of note are the ashlar stomion (of conglomerate) and dromos while the chamber itself remains made of smaller stones, placing the tomb in Wace's second group

A beehive tomb, also known as a tholos tomb (plural tholoi; from Greek: θολωτός τάφος, romanized: tholotós táphos, θολωτοί τάφοι tholotoi táphoi, "domed tomb(s)"), is a burial structure characterized by its false dome created by corbelling, the superposition of successively smaller rings of mudbricks or, more often, stones. The resulting structure resembles a beehive, hence the traditional English name.

Tholoi were used for burial in several cultures in the Mediterranean and West Asia, but in some cases they were used for different purposes such as homes (Cyprus), rituals (Bulgaria, Syria), and even fortification (Spain, Sardinia). Although Max Mallowan used the same name for the circular houses belonging to the Neolithic culture of Tell Halaf (Iraq, Syria and Turkey), there is no relationship between them.

== Greece ==
In Greece, the vaulted tholoi are a monumental Late Bronze Age development. Their origin is a matter of considerable debate; they were either inspired by the tholoi of Crete, which were first used in the Early Minoan period, or they were a natural development of tumulus burials dating to the Middle Bronze Age. In concept, they are similar to the much more numerous Mycenaean chamber tombs which seem to have emerged at about the same time. Both have chamber, doorway stomion, and entrance passage dromos, but tholoi are largely built, while chamber tombs are rock-cut.

A few early examples of tholoi have been found in Messenia in the SW Peloponnese Greece (for example at Voidhokoilia), and recently near Troezen in the NE Peloponnese. These tholoi are built on level ground and then enclosed by a mound of earth. A pair of tumuli at Marathon, Greece indicate how a built rectangular (but without a vault) central chamber was extended with an entrance passage.

After about 1500 BCE, beehive tombs became more widespread and are found in every part of the Mycenaean heartland. In contrast, however, to the early examples these are almost always cut into the slope of a hillside so that only the upper third of the vaulted chamber was above ground level. This masonry was then concealed with a relatively small mound of earth.

The tombs usually contain more than one burial, in various places in the tomb either on the floor, in pits and cists or on stone-built or rock-cut benches, and with various grave goods. After a burial, the entrance to the tomb was filled in with soil, leaving a small mound with most of the tomb underground.

The chamber is always built in masonry, even in the earliest examples, as is the stomion or entrance-way. The dromos in early examples was usually just cut from the bedrock, as in the Panagia Tomb at Mycenae itself. In later examples such as the Treasury of Atreus and Tomb of Clytemnestra (both at Mycenae), all three parts were constructed of fine ashlar masonry.

The chambers were built as corbelled vaults, with layers of stone placed closer together as the vault tapers toward the top of the tomb. These stone layers were trimmed from inside the tomb, creating a smooth dome.

The entrances provided an opportunity for conspicuous demonstration of wealth. That of the Treasury of Atreus, for example, was decorated with columns of red and green “Lapis Lacedaimonius” brought from quarries over 100 km away.

The abundance of such tombs, often with more than one being associated with a settlement during one specific time period, may indicate that their use was not confined to the ruling monarchy only, although the sheer size and therefore the outlay required for the larger tombs (ranging 10–15 m (33–49 ft) in diameter and height) would argue in favour of royal commissions. The larger tombs contained amongst the richest finds to have come from the Late Bronze Age of Mainland Greece, despite the tombs having been pillaged both in antiquity and more recently. Although the Vapheio tholos, south of Sparta, had been robbed, two cists in the floor had escaped notice. These contained, among other valuable items, the two gold "Vapheio cups" decorated with scenes of bull taming which are among the best known of Mycenaean treasures.

== Levant and Cyprus ==
Circular structures were commonly built in the Near East, including the examples known as tholoi found in the Neolithic Halaf culture of Iraq, Syria and Turkey. They were probably used as both houses and as storage structures, but ritual use may also have occurred. Other, later examples are found in Cyprus (Khirokitia), where they were used as homes. There is no clear connection between these domestic, circular buildings and later tholos tombs.

== Southern Europe and Sardinia ==
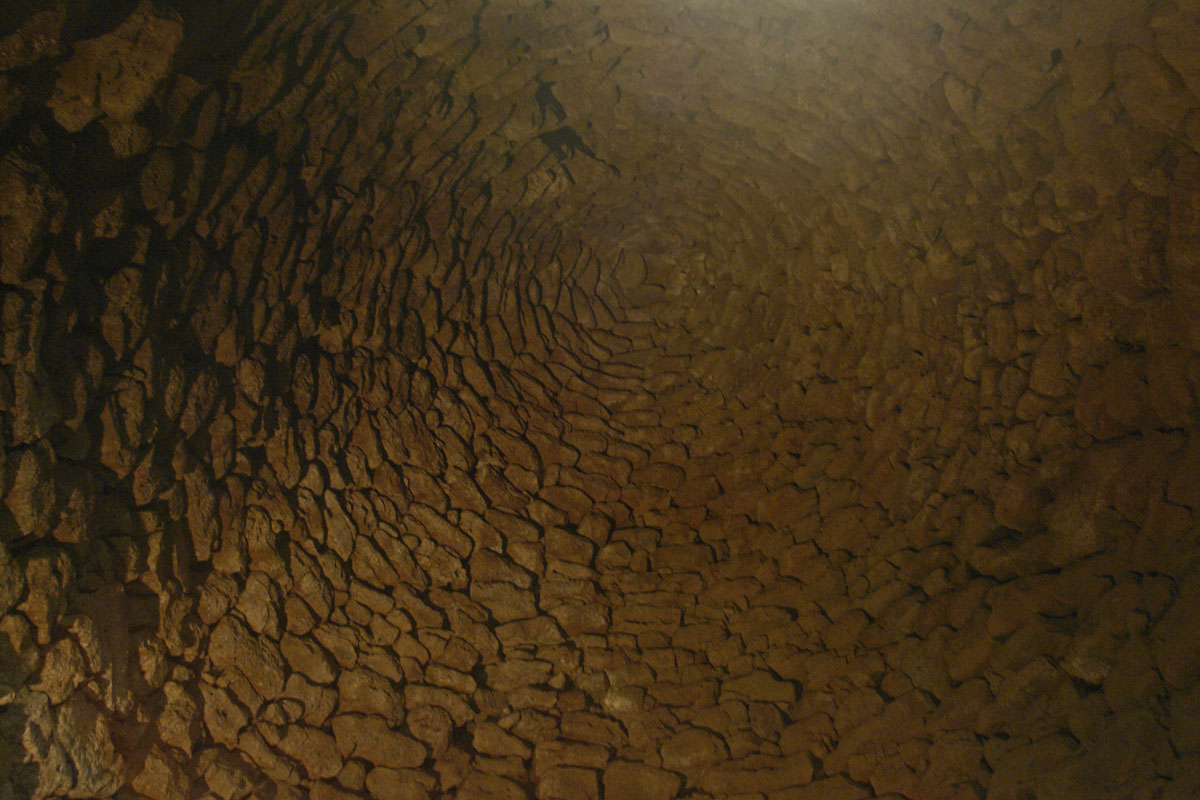
Tholos of the Nuraghe Arrubiu

In the Chalcolithic period of the Iberian Peninsula, beehive tombs appear among other innovative "megalithic" variants, from c. 3000 BCE. They are especially common in southern Spain and Portugal, while in Central Portugal and southeastern France other styles (artificial caves especially) are preferred instead. The civilization of Los Millares and its Bronze Age successor, El Argar, are particularly related to this burial style.

The Bronze Age fortifications known as motillas in La Mancha (Spain) also use the tholos building technique.

The imposing stone structures known as nuraghi, as well as the similar structures of southern Corsica, dominated the Bronze Age landscape of Sardinia (Italy). Nuraghi are truncated conical towers of dry-laid stone, about 40 feet in diameter, sloping up to a circular roof some 50 feet above the ground. The vaulted ceiling is 20 to 35 feet above the floor. Although the remains of some 7,000 nuraghi have been found, up to 30,000 may have been built.

There are also recorded Etruscan tombs at a necropolis at Banditaccia dating from the 6th and 7th centuries BCE, having an external appearance similar to a beehive. The interiors of these Etruscan tombs were furnished and decorated to resemble domestic dwellings, providing insight into the Etruscan practice of honoring the dead in a manner that reflected daily life.

== Bulgaria ==
The beehive Thracian Tomb of Kazanlak is an example of the richly decorated tholoi tombs of Thracian rulers, many of which are found in modern Bulgaria and date from the 4th–3rd century BCE. The walls of the Kazanlak tomb are covered with plaster and stucco, with ornate scenes from the life of the deceased. Other tumuli, known as mogili in Bulgarian, that feature underground chambers in the form of a beehive dome include, among others, the Thracian Tomb of Sveshtari, Thracian tomb of Aleksandrovo, Golyama Arsenalka, Tomb of Seuthes III, Thracian tomb Shushmanets, Thracian tomb Griffins, Thracian tomb Helvetia, Thracian tomb Ostrusha. There have been several significant gold and silver treasures associated with Thracian tombs currently kept at Bulgaria's Archaeological and National Historical Museum and other institutions.

== Eastern Arabia ==
The earliest stone-built tombs which can be called "beehive" are in Oman and the U.A.E., built of stacked flat stones which occur in nearby geological formations. They date to the Hafit period of the early Bronze Age, between 3,500 and 2,500 years BCE, a period when the Arabian Peninsula was subject to much more rainfall than now, and supported a flourishing civilization in what is now the Arabian Desert, to the west of the Hajar Mountains along the Gulf of Oman. No burial remains have ever been retrieved from these "tombs", though there seems no other purpose for their construction. They are only superficially similar to the Aegean tombs (circular shape) as they are built entirely above ground level and do not share the same tripartite structure – the entrances are usually an undifferentiated part of the circular walling of the tomb. Currently there are three areas where these tombs can be found: Al-Hajar Region (particularly Jebel Hafeet near Al Ain in the U.A.E., and the Archaeological Sites of Bat, Al-Khutm and Al-Ayn in Oman), Hat Region, and Hadbin area close to Barkaʾ. The Hajar tombs are very numerous and one or two have been restored, allowing one to crawl into the centre of a tall stone structure measuring 5–6 m (16–20 ft).

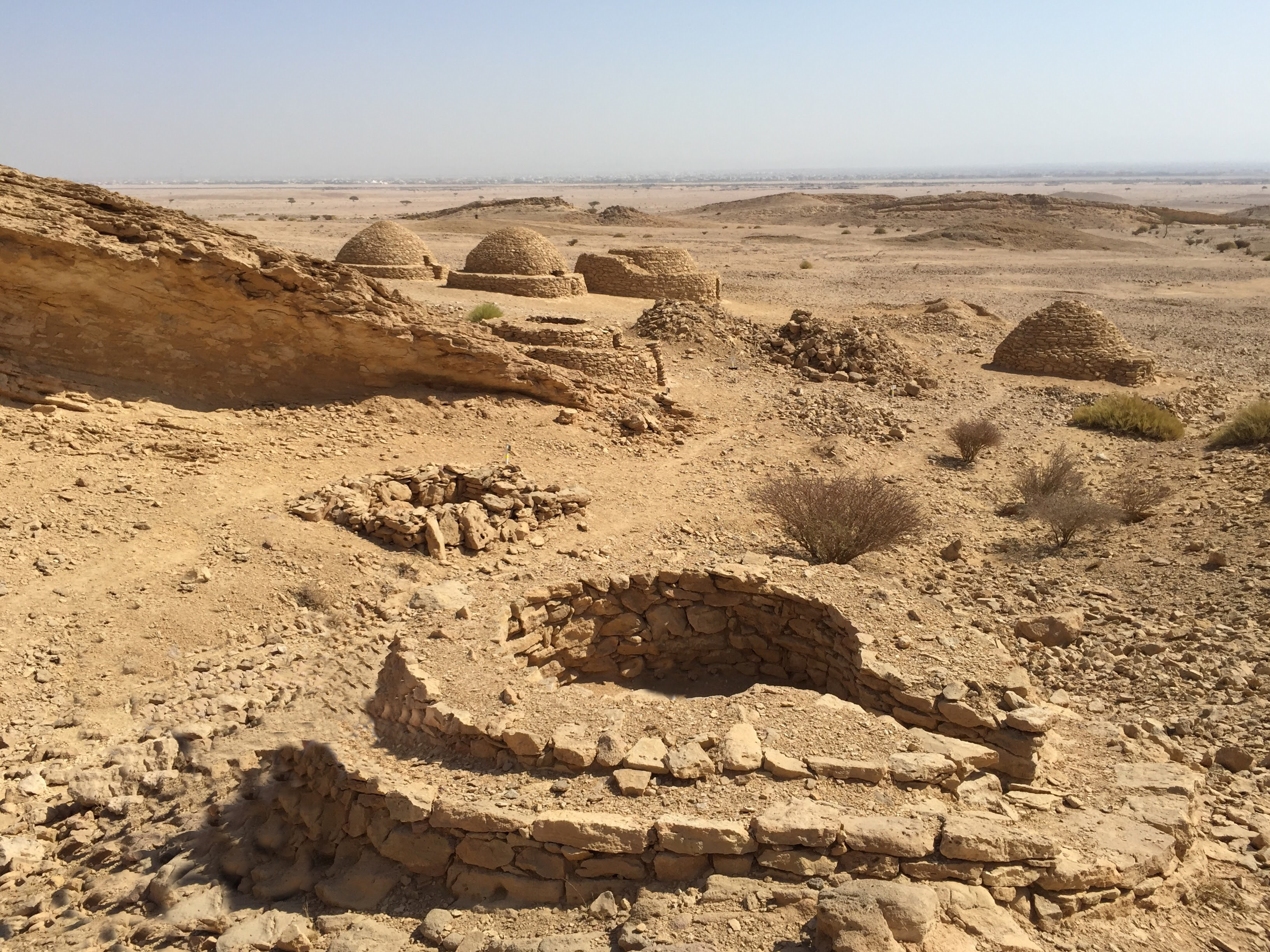
Beehive tombs dating to the Hafit period (approximately 5000 years ago), near Jebel Hafeet in Al Ain, the U.A.E.

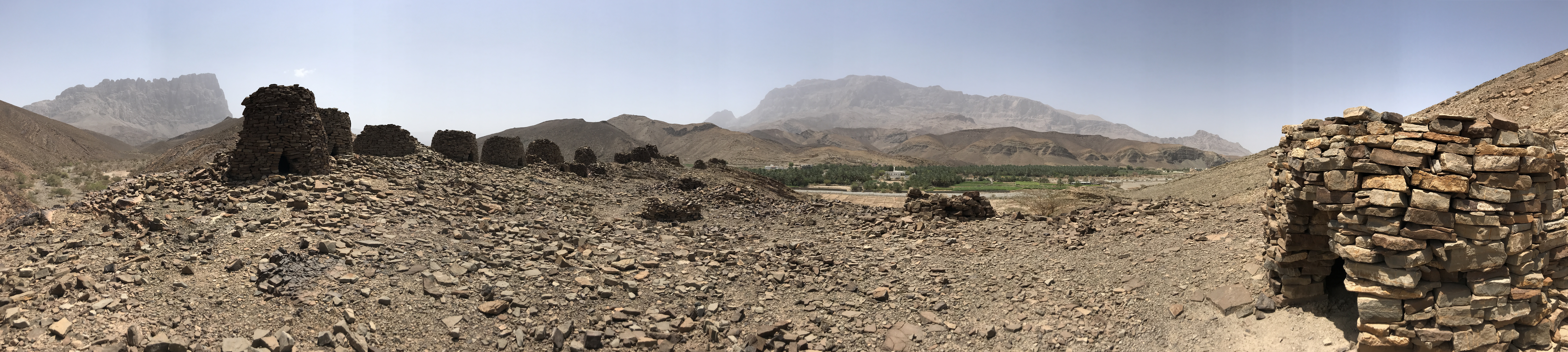
The Archaeological Sites of Bat, Al-Khutm and Al-Ayn in the Hajar Mountains of Oman

== See also ==
- Beehive house
- Mycenaean Greece
- Nuraghi
- Tholos of Delphi
- Minoan sites with tholos tombs: Armenoi, Archanes-Phourni, Hagia Photia, Kamilari, Kavousi Vronda, Nea Roumata, Papoura, Phylaki, Stilos, Yerokambos
- Early and simple domes
