= Agrionia =

Ancient religious festival in Orchomenus

Agrionia was an ancient Greek religious festival in honor of Dionysus Agrionius. It was celebrated annually, especially at Orchomenus in Boeotia.

According to Plutarch, agrionia was celebrated at night with only women accompanied by the priests of Dionysus, who often wore black garments. Women pretended to search for Dionysos and then declared that he had fled to the Muses and hidden there. After that, they feasted and began to present and solve riddles.

According to legend, the Minyades or Oleiai (Ὀλεῖαι), the daughters of king Minyas of Orchomenus, who had despised the Dionysian rites, were seized with a desire to eat human flesh of one of their children. They cast lots to decide which of their children they would eat and selected Hippasus, son of Leucippe.

Plutarch also explains that the festival included a human sacrifice. At this festival, it was originally the custom for the priest of the god to pursue a woman of the Minyan family with a drawn sword and kill her. This practice was discontinued after the occurrence of bad omens.
