= Stilos (archaeological site) =

Archaeological site in Crete

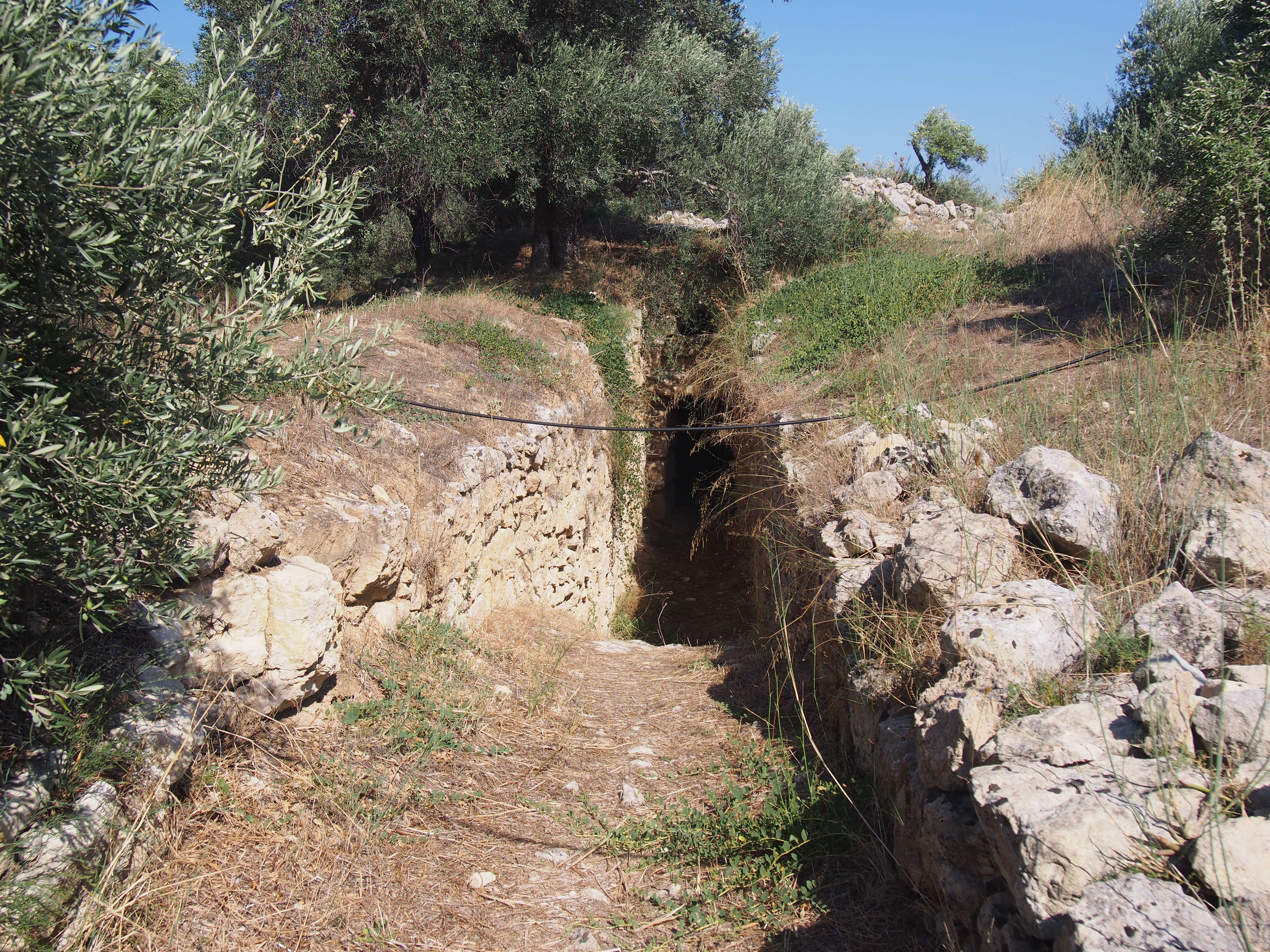
The tholos tomb of Stylos

Stylos is an archaeological site of an ancient Minoan settlement and cemetery near the modern village of Stylos on the Greek island of Crete. Stylos means "column" in Greek. Stylos is near the important archaeological site of Aptera in Chania regional unit. The site was first excavated by N. Platon and C. Davaras. A potter's kiln, a building with four rooms and a Late Minoan tholos tomb have been excavated.
