= Nea Roumata (archaeological site) =

Nea Roumata is the archaeological site of an ancient Minoan tomb near the village of Nea Roumata in Chania regional unit, Crete, Greece.

== Archaeology ==
A small Early Minoan I tholos tomb made of river bed rocks was found at Nea Roumata. A single body and two vases were excavated. The tomb is similar to contemporary Cyclades tombs.
