= Orchomenus (Boeotia) =

Town in Central Greece

Orchomenos Ορχομενός
- Municipality
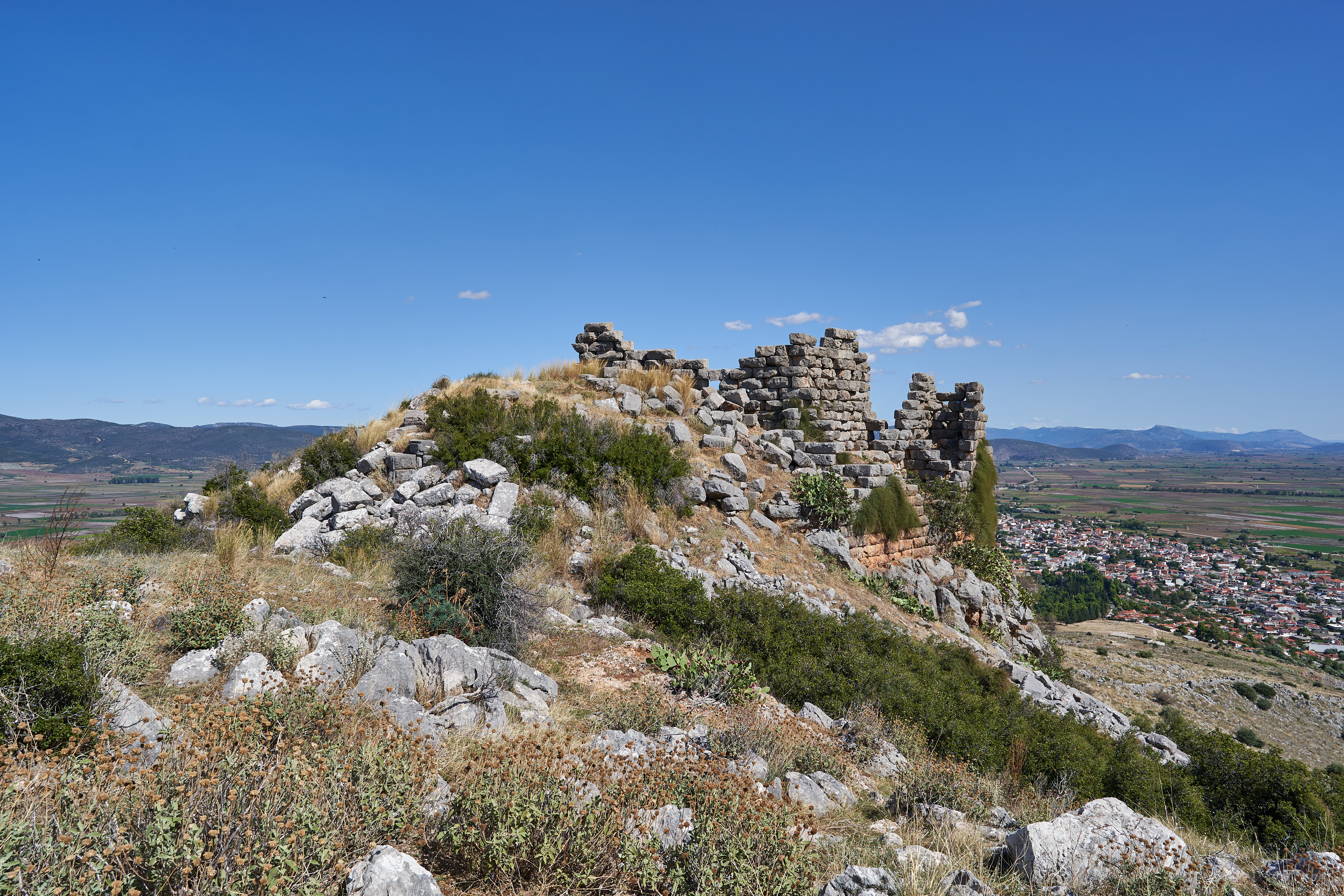
- The Acropolis of Orchomenus

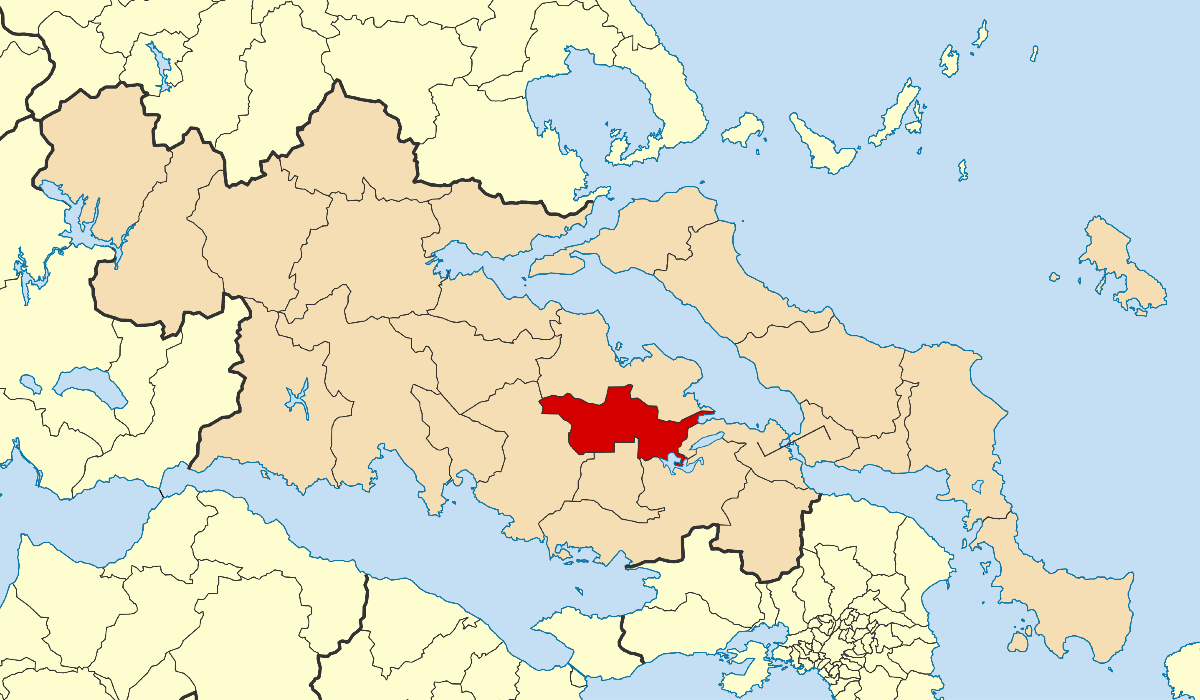

- Location within Greece
- Coordinates: 38°29′N 22°59′E
- Country: Greece
- Administrative region: Central Greece
- Regional unit: Boeotia

Area
  - Municipality: 415.9 km^{2} (160.6 sq mi)
  - Municipal unit: 230.098 km^{2} (88.841 sq mi)
  - Community: 43.431 km^{2} (16.769 sq mi)

Population (2021)
  - Municipality: 9,381
  - Density: 22.56/km^{2} (58.42/sq mi)
  - Municipal unit: 7,105
  - Municipal unit density: 30.88/km^{2} (79.97/sq mi)
  - Community: 4,285
  - Community density: 98.66/km^{2} (255.5/sq mi)
- Time zone: UTC+2 (EET)
  - Summer (DST): UTC+3 (EEST)

Orchomenus (Ancient Greek: Ὀρχομενός; Modern Greek: Ορχομενός, Orchomenos) is a town and a municipality in Boeotia, Greece. It is best known today for its rich archaeological site, that was inhabited from the Neolithic through the Hellenistic periods and is the setting for many early Greek myths. It is often referred to as "Minyan Orchomenus", to distinguish it from a later city of the same name in Arcadia. It is located at the base of Akontion near snow-capped Mount Parnassos.

== History ==
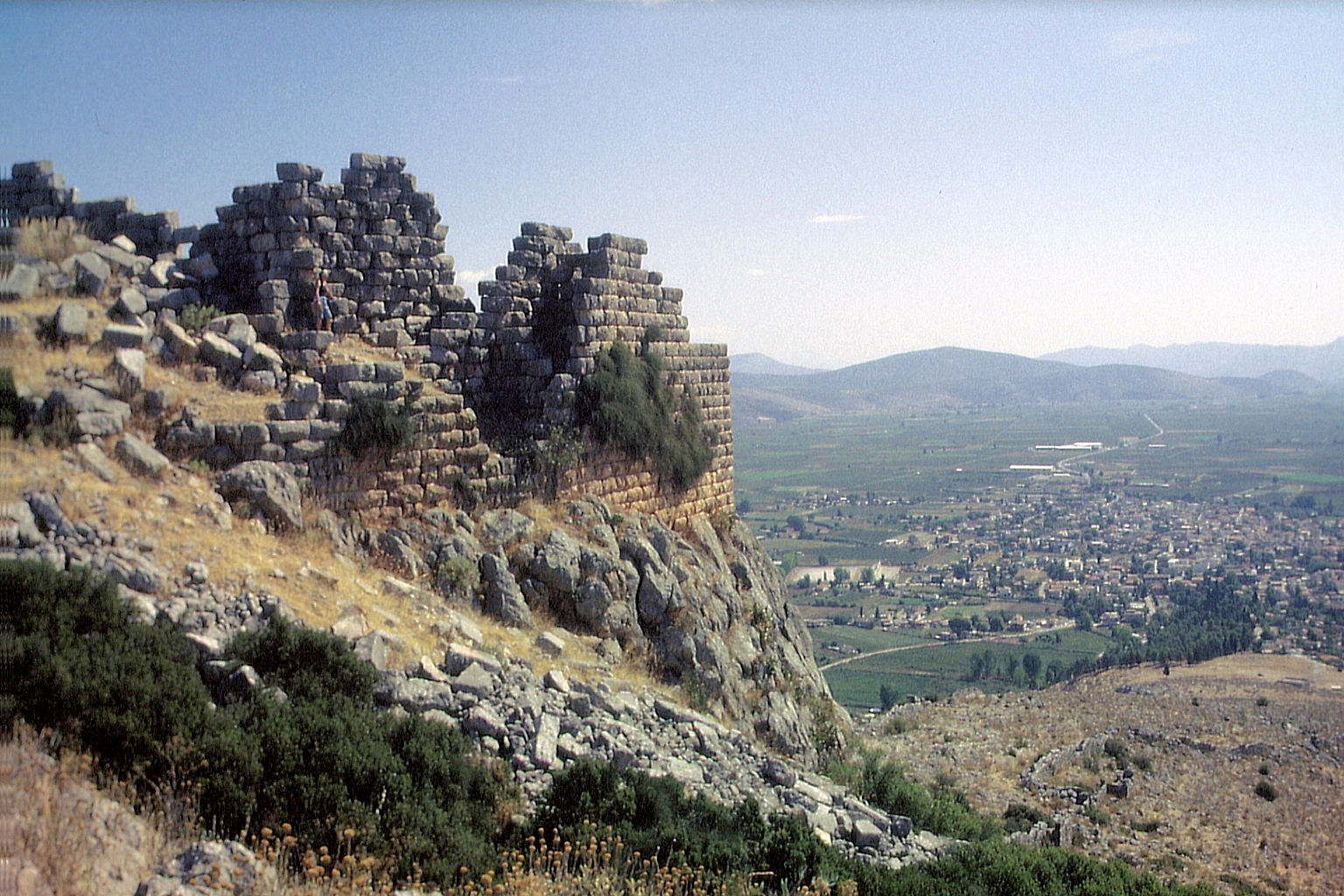
Fortification walls on the acropolis

According to the founding myth of Orchomenos, its royal dynasty was established by the Minyans, who had followed their eponymous leader Minyas from coastal Thessaly to settle the site.

=== Early Bronze Age ===
Round houses (two to six metres in diameter) from the Early Bronze Age (2800–2000 BC) were discovered.

=== Late Bronze Age ===
==== Mycenaean period ====
In the Bronze Age, during the fourteenth and thirteenth centuries BC, Orchomenos became a rich and important centre of civilisation in Mycenaean Greece and a rival to Thebes. It had a trading port at Larymna.

Trojan War. Orchomenos is mentioned among the Achaean cities sending ships to engage in the Trojan War in Homer's "Catalogue of Ships" in the Iliad: together with Aspledon, they contributed thirty ships and their complement of men. The wealth brought in via the agricultural land under its control probably explains its Homeric epithet "rich in gold" (πολύχρυσος).

Palace. The Mycenaean palace to the east of the Tholos tomb and lying partially underneath the church is only partially excavated and consists of three wings, some of which were the walls were decorated with frescoes. The palace was destroyed by fire c. 1200 BC.

Tholos Tomb. To the west of the palace was the great tholos tomb, known as the "Treasury of Minyas", is a beehive tomb that show the power of Orchomenos in Mycenaean Greece. It was most likely the royal burial site of the local wanax (king), and can be compared with the Treasury of Atreus at Mycenae.

Hydraulics. A massive hydraulic undertaking drained the marshes of Lake Kopaïs, making it a rich agricultural area. Here "highly skilled engineers drained the greatest lake in Greece, creating a vast fertile plain ringed by sophisticated fortifications and cultivated by slaves."

Many histories of Mycenaean Greece contend that Orchomenos was, like Pylos, one of the cities destroyed during the turbulent period referred to as the Bronze Age Collapse. Ancient Greek legends attribute the destruction to a war with the neighboring power of Thebes. However, Jesse Millek recently challenged this assumption, claiming it is based on misreading archeological evidence that the site was simply abandoned during the same time period. Bryan Feuer commented that archeological information on Mycenaean Orchomenos is fragmentary in part because much of its remains "have been destroyed by erosion or subsequent rebuilding".

=== Iron Age ===
Orchomenos seems to have been one of the city-states that joined the Calaurian maritime League in the seventh century BC. Although their rivals Thebes confirmed their supremacy by the end of the century reflected by inscriptions, Orchomenos joined the Theban-led Boeotian League in c. 600 BC.

Orchomenos struck its coinage from the mid-sixth century.

=== Classical Age ===
Classical Orchomenos was known for its sanctuary of the Charites or Graces, the oldest in the city (the 9th century Byzantine monastery church of Panagia Skripou probably occupies the same spot). Here the Charites had their earliest veneration, in legend instituted by Eteocles; musical and poetical agonistic games, the Charitesia, were held in their honour, in the theatre that was discovered in 1972. The Agrionia, a festival of the god Dionysus, involved the ritual pursuit of women by a man representing Dionysus.

==== Persian period ====
In 480–479 BC, the Orchomenians joined their neighbouring rivals the Thebans to turn back the invading forces of Xerxes in the Greco-Persian Wars. In mid-century, Orchomenos sheltered the oligarchic exiles who freed Boeotia from Athenian control. In the fourth century the traditional rivalry with Thebes made Orchomenos an ally of Agesilaus II and Sparta against Thebes, in 395 and again in 394 BC. The Theban revenge after their defeat of Sparta in the Battle of Leuctra (371 BC) was delayed by the tolerant policies of Epaminondas: the Boeotian League sacked Orchomenos in 364 BC. Although the Phocians rebuilt the city in 355 BC, the Thebans destroyed it again in 349.

==== Hellenistic period ====
The broad plain between Orchomenos and the acropolis of Chaeronea witnessed two battles of major importance in Classical antiquity. In 338 BC, after a whirlwind march south into central Greece, Philip II of Macedon defeated Thebes and Athens on the plain of Chaironeia during the first Battle of Chaeronea, establishing Macedonian supremacy over the city-states, and demonstrated the prowess of Philip's young son Alexander the Great. During Alexander's campaign against Thebes in 335 BC, Orchomenos took the side of the Macedonians. In recompense, Philip and Alexander rebuilt Orchomenos, when the theatre and the fortification walls, visible today, were constructed.

The fortification walls of Orchomenos were built in the 2nd half of the 4th century BC under the Macedonians and crown the east end of mount Akontion. The theatre was built around the end of the 4th century BC. The cavea, with seats for the spectators, the orchestra and part of the scena are all preserved. It was in use until late Roman times (4th century AD).

==== Roman period ====
The second Battle of Chaeronea occurred when Roman Republican forces under the later Dictator Sulla defeated those of King Mithridates VI of Pontus near Chaeronea, in 86 BC during the First Mithridatic War. This Second Battle of Chaeronea was followed by the Battle of Orchomenus, when Archelaus' forces were completely destroyed.

Orchomenos remained a small town until Late Roman times when the theatre was still in use, and continued afterwards.

=== Later history ===
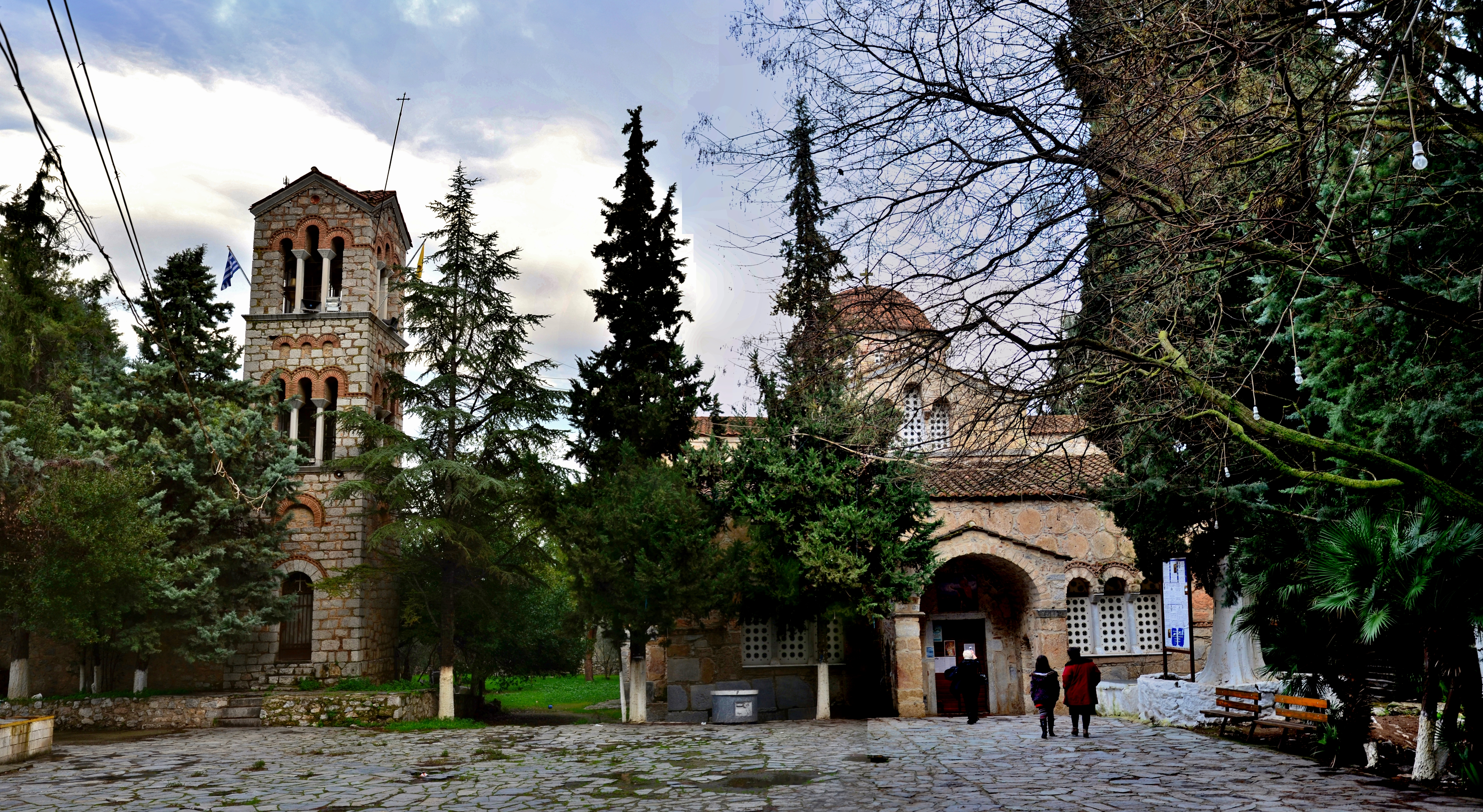
Byzantine church of the Panagia at Skripou

Opposite the ancient theatre is the 9th-century Byzantine church of the Dormition of the Virgin Mary (Panagia) of Skripou. Well-preserved inscriptions date the church securely to 873/4, naming its sponsor as the Protospatharios Leon, who served as a senior official of the emperor Basil I during the period of his joint reign with his sons Constantine and Leo.

The modern municipality of Orchomenos was formed in the local government reform of 2011 by the merger of the following two former municipalities, which became municipal units, each subdivided into local communities:

- Akraifnia (Akraifnio, Kastro, Kokkino)
- Orchomenos (Agios Dimitrios, Agios Spyridonas, Dionysos, Karya, Loutsio, Orchomenos, Pavlos, Pyrgos)

The municipality has an area of 415.914 km^{2}, the municipal unit Orchomenos 230.098 km^{2}, the community Orchomenos 43.431 km^{2}. The seat of the municipality is in the town Orchomenos.

== Archaeology ==
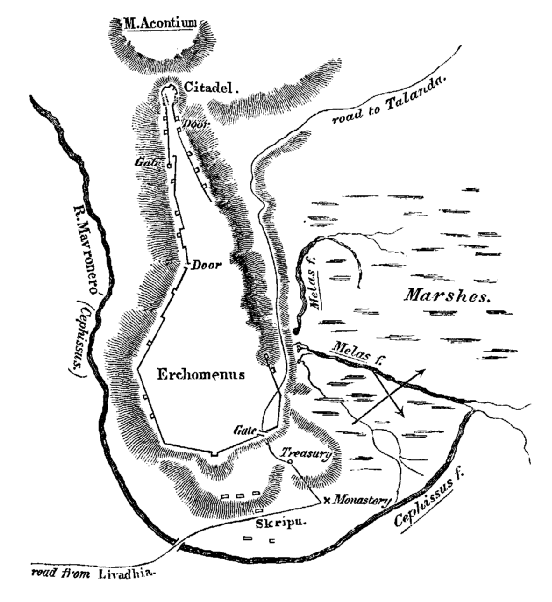
Map of Orchomenus

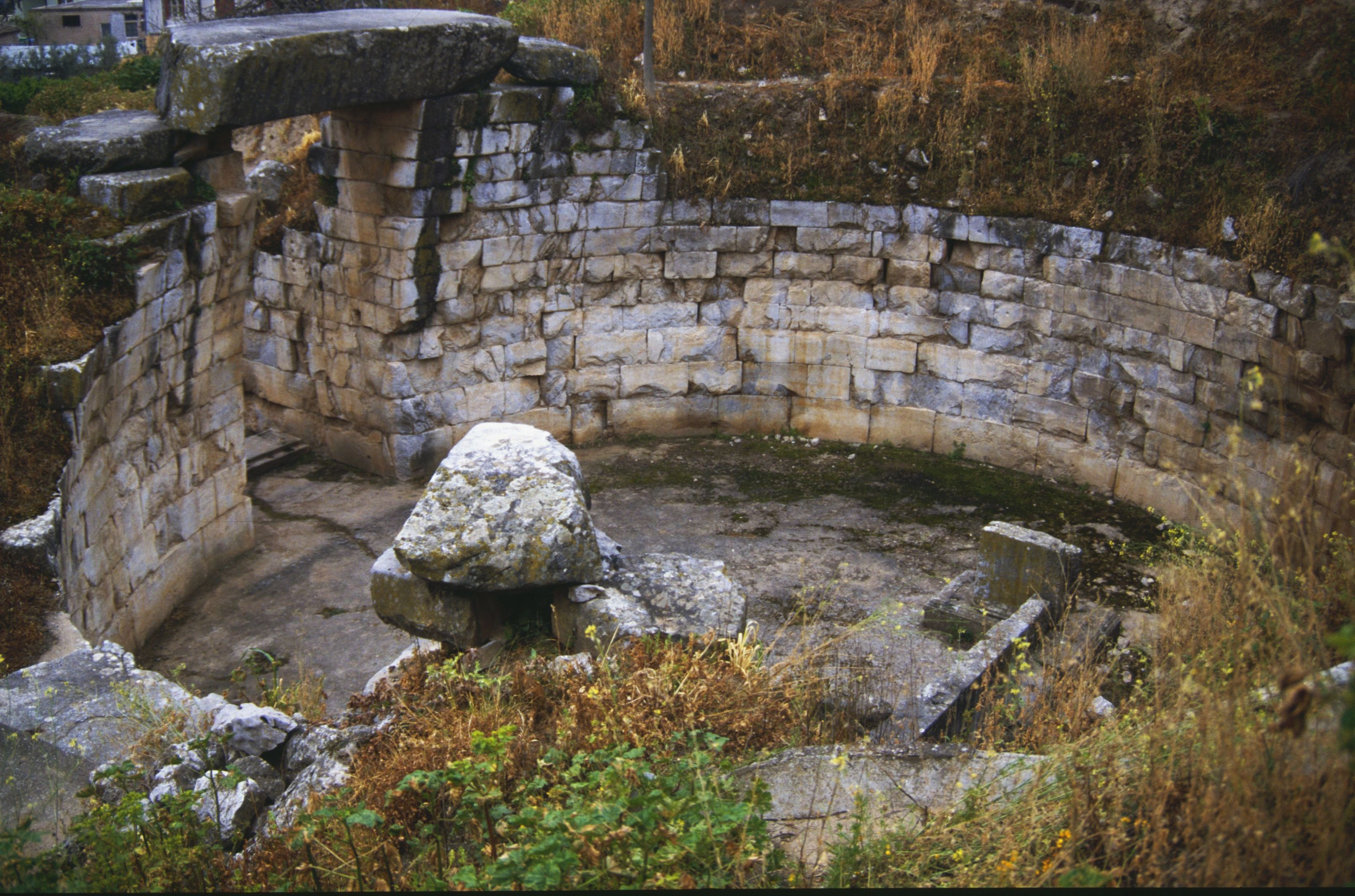
The Tomb of Minyas

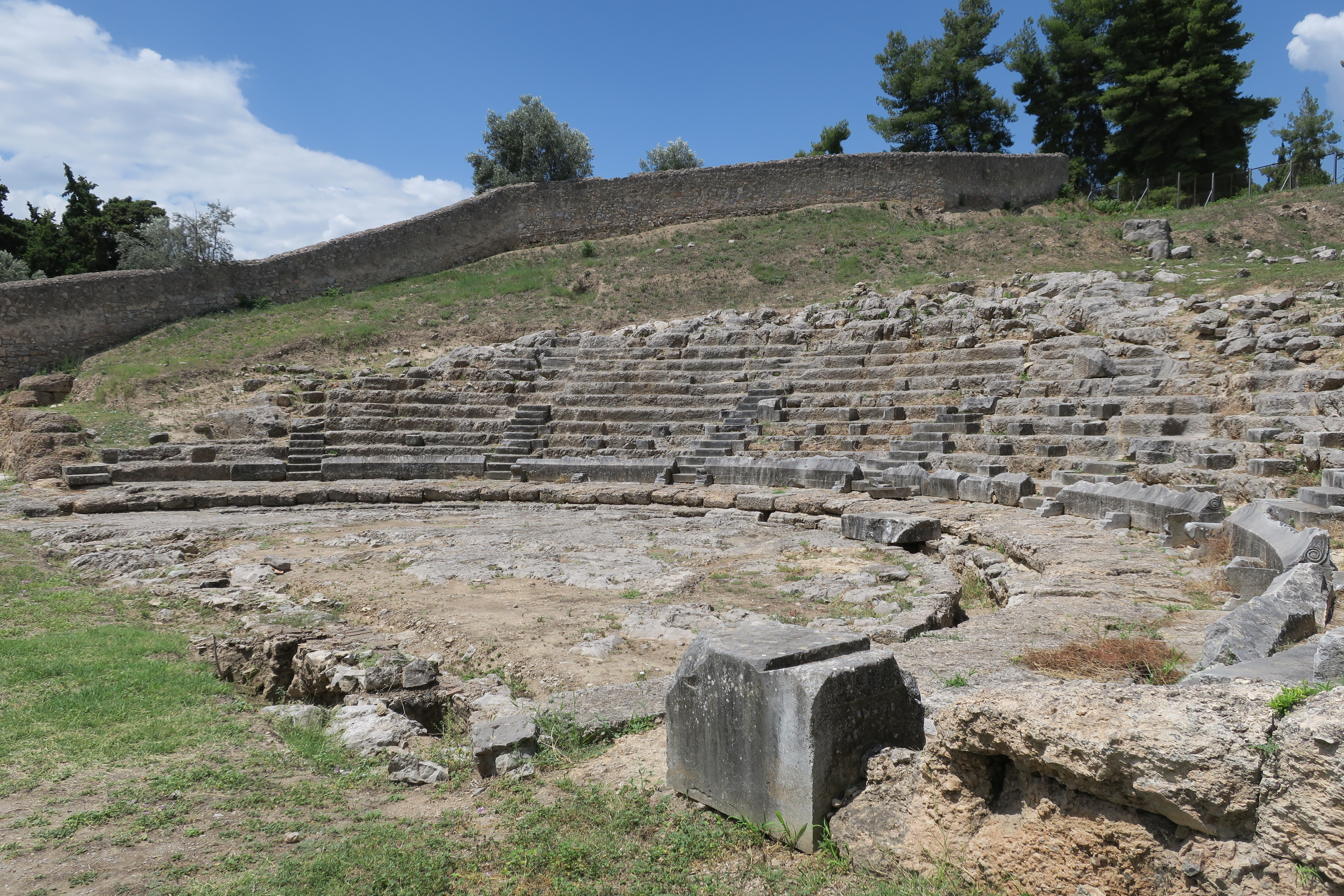
The theatre

Most excavations have focused on the early and Mycenean areas of the lower town, while the later Hellenistic city on the acropolis remains largely unexplored.

In 1880–86, Heinrich Schliemann's excavations revealed the tholos tomb he called the "Tomb of Minyas", a Mycenaean monument that equaled the "Tomb of Atreus" at Mycenae itself. In 1893, André de Ridder excavated the temple of Asklepios and some burials in the Roman necropolis. In 1903–05, a Bavarian archaeological mission under Heinrich Bulle and Adolf Furtwängler conducted successful excavations at the site. Research continued in 1970–73 by the Archaeological Service under Theodore Spyropoulos, uncovering the Mycenaean palace, a prehistoric cemetery, the theatre and other structures.

The Tomb of Minyas is one of the greatest burial monuments of the Mycenaean period. The tomb was probably built for the members of the royal family of Orchomenos in 1250 BC and was plundered in antiquity. The monument was visible for many centuries after its original use and even became a place of worship in the Hellenistic period. It was probably a famous landmark until at least the second century AD, when Pausanias visited Orchomenos and described the tholos in detail. It had a dromos thirty metres long. Its entrance was built of dark grey Levadeia marble and had a wooden door. The lintel, still in place today, is six metres long and weighs several tons. The entrance and the chamber were decorated with bronze rosettes as shown by the attachment holes on the walls and the ceiling of the side chamber is decorated with spirals and floral motifs in relief. In the centre of the Tholos, a rectangular burial monument dates to the Ηellenistic period (323–30 BC). It was partially restored by the architect-archaeologist Anastasios Orlandos. In 1994, the Hellenic Ministry of Culture undertook restoration work consisting mainly of drainage and strengthening of the walls of the side chamber.

== See also ==
- Achaean League
- Orchomenos, a king in Greek mythology.
- Erginus, king of Orchomenus.
- Elara and her son Tityos
- Eurybotadas
- Cephissus
- Panagia Skripou Monastery
- Early and simple domes
