= Yerokambos =

Minoan archeological site in Crete

Yerokambos is the archaeological site of an ancient Minoan cemetery in central Crete.

== Geography ==
The site is near the modern village of Lendas, south of the Asterousia mountains.

== Archaeology ==
The tombs were built in Early Minoan I and in use through Middle Minoan IA.
