= Panagia Skripou Monastery =

- Μοναστήρι Παναγία η Σκριπού
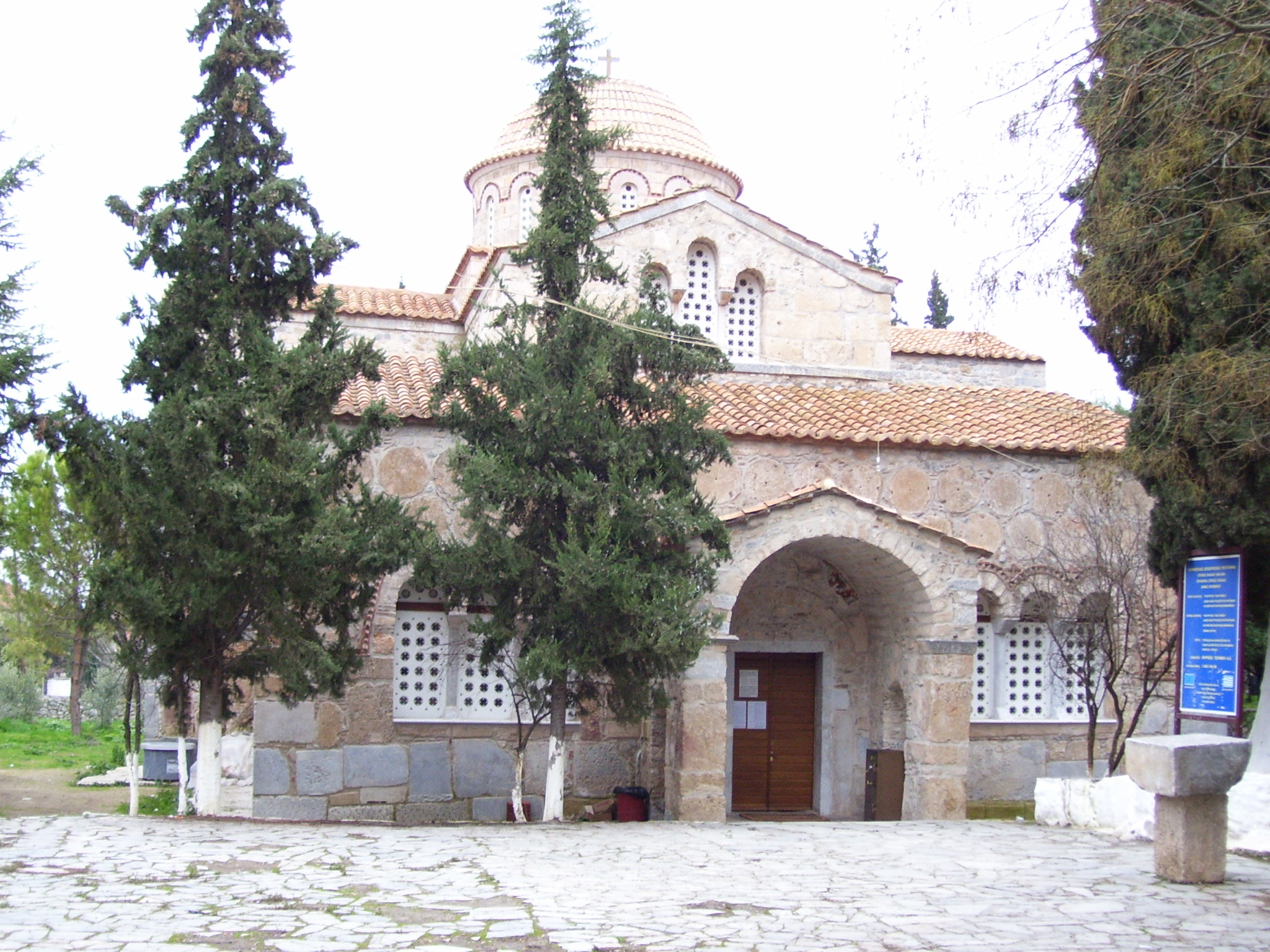

Monastery information
- Other names: Monastery of the Dormition of the Theotokos "Panagia Skripou"
- Established: 874
- Dedicated to: Dormition of Theotokos
- Celebration date: August 15; August 23; September 10
- Diocese: Metropolis of Thebes and Livadeia

Site
- Location: Orchomenus, Boeotia
- Country: Greece
- Coordinates: 38°29′38″N 22°58′35″E

The Panagia Skripou Monastery (Greek: Μοναστήρι Παναγία η Σκριπού) is located in Orchomenus, Boeotia, Greece. From the monastery today, only its katholikon (church) functions, which is the most important monument from the series of temples of the "transitional cruciform" type, in the Greek area.

Most probably the temple was designed as a funerary monument for its sponsor, Leo, the Protospatharios of the palace guard of the Byzantine Emperor (873/874 AD).

A vertical sundial adorns the church of the Dormition of Theotokos (Catholic) of the monastery.

== The Monastery and the temple ==
The Monastery of the Dormition of Theotokos or Monastery of Panagia Skripou is located in the area of the same name - today's Athamas - in Orchomenus in Boeotia, opposite the archaeological site of the city and the ancient Acropolis of Orchomenus. In the wider area, the traveler Pausanias mentions two sanctuaries of Harita and Dionysus, which have not been found to date, but must in all probability have been on the site where the Monastery of Panagia Skripou was built in 874. After all, this is evidenced by the excavation work that revealed a building from the Mycenaean period on the outside – in the precincts of the temple. Also inside the church they discovered the existence of an early Christian mosaic.

The Monastery of Panagia Skripous is a building of the 9th century and from the original overall complex today only the Catholic, dedicated to the Dormition of Theotokos, but also to the apostles Peter and Paul, as evidenced by the three-fold Holy Vima, is preserved. In fact, the two eastern side aisles do not function as a purpose and deacon, but according to the inscriptions as chapels of Saints Peter and Paul "of Rome volax hierin konin amfikalypte" (ων Ρώμης βώλαξ ιερήν κόνιν αμφικαλύπτει), according to the excellent epigram engraved there.

The church of Panagia Skripou of Boeotia is the most important monument from the series of churches of the transitional cruciform type in the Greek area and is the largest and most luxurious known monument of the time, outside of Constantinople. This monastic church stands out for its size (22.30 × 18.60 meters), without the narthex, for its rich marble decoration and finally for the historical information provided by 4 inscriptions with a monumental expression. From them we learn that the founder of the temple is Leo "royal Protospatharios, and over the household", i.e. leader of the spatharios — the palace guard — in the Holy Palace in Constantinople. Leo was the owner of the ancient Orchomenus area and built the church in 873/874. Indeed, regarding the date of construction we are absolutely certain, because a written inscription, which is embedded on the outside of the sanctuary's arch, records both the date of construction of the catholicon, 874, and the sponsor-owner of the Monastery, Leo.

We do not know for sure where the strange name Skripou comes from for the Monastery, which is the oldest Byzantine monument in Boeotia and one of the most important in Greece. However, the outside of the church is full of inscriptions and it is likely that the name Skripou is due to these walled-in inscriptions, from the Latin scriptus, which means inscription.

The church of the Dormition is inscribed cruciform with a dome, with protruding cross antennae and a narrow narthex to the west. In its masonry, plenty of ready-made ancient material has been used (as is the case in many Christian temples of the time) which comes from the nearby archaeological site of the historical city of Orchomenus. Thus, column vertebrae, carved elbows and even tombstones have been used which create unexpected ornaments and nuances on the large flat walls.

This monument is an attempt to transition from the early Christian Basilica to the Byzantine style. The temple preserves wonderful early Christian sculptures, rare inscriptions from the Christian, but also the pre-Christian period, which were used as building material. It is likely that the temple was designed as a funerary monument to its sponsor (although this was not common in Byzantine Greece) and perhaps the vertical sundial that adorns the temple is a kind of reference to eternal life. In any case, the founder of the temple wanted this building to have a "resplendent, polished surround everywhere".

The sculptural decoration of the katholikon of the Monastery is rich on its internal and external surfaces, however, many sculpted members (from ancient temples or even from an early Christian cemetery) are also incorporated in the later cells, south of the katholikon and in the propylon to the west, while others are in the storerooms. The oldest cells of the Monastery are located to the west of the newest, in a building consisting of five consecutive tile-roofed spaces.

According to archaeological research, the oldest of the frescoes that adorn the temple are from the 12th century. Since 1930, restoration work has been carried out, as well as work for the maintenance and cleaning of the frescoes, while in 1939 the bell tower of the church, located to the northwest of the monastery site, was also built (on the plans of the Ministry of Culture).

This historic monument was included in the Community Support Framework 1994–1999, in the Regional Operational Program of Central Greece. And while the unveiling and preservation of the sanctuaries' frescoes, as well as the fixing and cleaning of the sculptures of the narthex, were being completed, the temple was set on fire. The fire caused serious damage, however, in a first phase, the inner temple was cleaned of smoke by sandblasting, while now the start of the second phase is expected for the restoration of the burned window shutters and the frescoes of the narthex.

Panagia Skripou for many years functioned as a monastery, while in recent years it functions as a parish church. It is celebrated on August 15, the feast of the Dormition of Theotokos, on August 23, the feast of Apodosis of the Dormition of Theotokos, but also on September 10, the day on which, in the year 1943, Orchomenus and its inhabitants were saved, (by a miracle of Panagia, according to tradition) by the German occupation troops who wanted to burn the city and kill its inhabitants.

== Sources ==
- E. Theodossiou & V.N. Manimanis: «The vertical sundial of the monastery of Panaghia Skripou», Proceedings of the 7th Hellenic Astronomy Conference, AIP Conference Proceedings, τόμ. 848, σσ. 934-938 (2006)
