= Kavousi Project =

Archeological project in Crete, Greece (1978–1992)

The Kavousi Project (also known as the Kavousi Excavations) was a multidisciplinary program of archaeological investigations (active seasons of fieldwork: 1978–1984, 1987–1992) in the area of Kavousi, a historic village at the eastern end of the Gulf of Mirabello in East Crete, Greece. The objective of the project was to restudy a number of archaeological sites originally investigated by the pioneering American archaeologist Harriet Boyd [Hawes] in the early years of the 20th century, focusing on the Greek Dark Age sites of Kavousi Vronda and Kavousi Kastro, but also including tombs at nearby Aloni, Plaï tou Kastrou, and Skouriasmenos, all located in the northern foothills of the Thripti Mountains of eastern Crete.

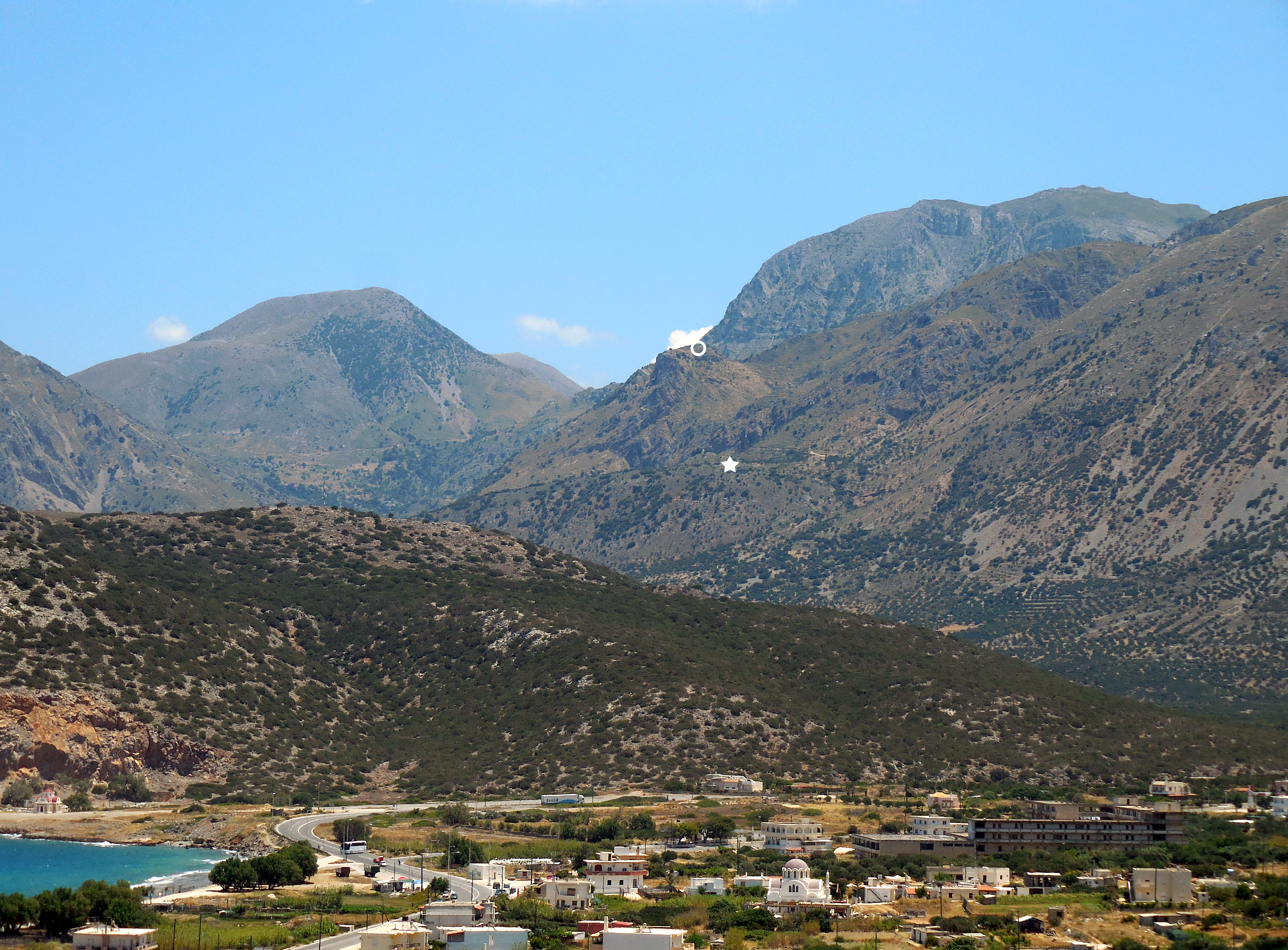
View of the archaeological sites of Kavousi Kastro (indicated by a circle) and Kavousi Vronda (indicated by a star), looking east from the (Institute for Aegean Prehistory Study Center for East Crete in Pacheia Ammos) (2014).

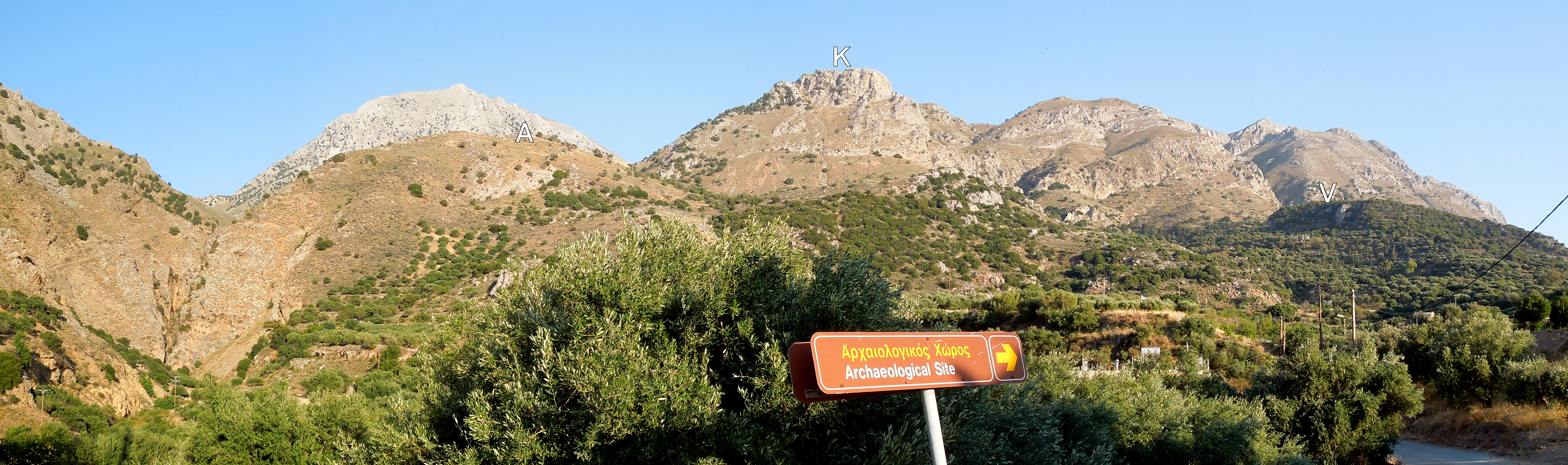
Panoramic view of the main archaeological sites above Kavousi village, looking south from the modern road (2012). From left to right: Azoria (A), Kastro (K), and Vronda (V).

The Kavousi Project was directed by Geraldine C. Gesell (University of Tennessee), Leslie Preston Day (College of Wooster; later, Wabash College), and William D.E. Coulson (University of Minnesota; later, American School of Classical Studies at Athens). The research and fieldwork were conducted with permission from the Greek Ministry of Culture, under the auspices of the American School of Classical Studies at Athens and the 24th Ephorate of Prehistoric and Classical Antiquities of the Greek Archaeological Service. Major financial supporters of the Kavousi Project included the University of Tennessee, the Institute for Aegean Prehistory, the National Endowment for the Humanities, the National Geographic Society, the American Philosophical Society, the American Council of Learned Societies, the David A. Packard Foundation, the David and Lucile Packard Foundation, the Samuel H. Kress Foundation, the Joullian Foundation, Mr. Richard L. Sias and Mrs. Jeannette F. Sias, and many others.

== History of Research ==
In 1974, Geraldine C. Gesell and Leslie Preston Day initiated a project to locate a number of ancient sites previously investigated by early American archaeologists in the Isthmus of Ierapetra, many of which were not marked accurately on maps of the time. By 1978, this informal survey was narrowed to sites in the area of Kavousi. In the same year (1978), Gesell and Day were joined by William D.E. Coulson to establish the Kavousi Project. When formal excavations at the sites of Vronda and Kastro began in 1987, the Kavousi Project became known as the Kavousi Excavations. A brief chronological outline of the work is as follows:

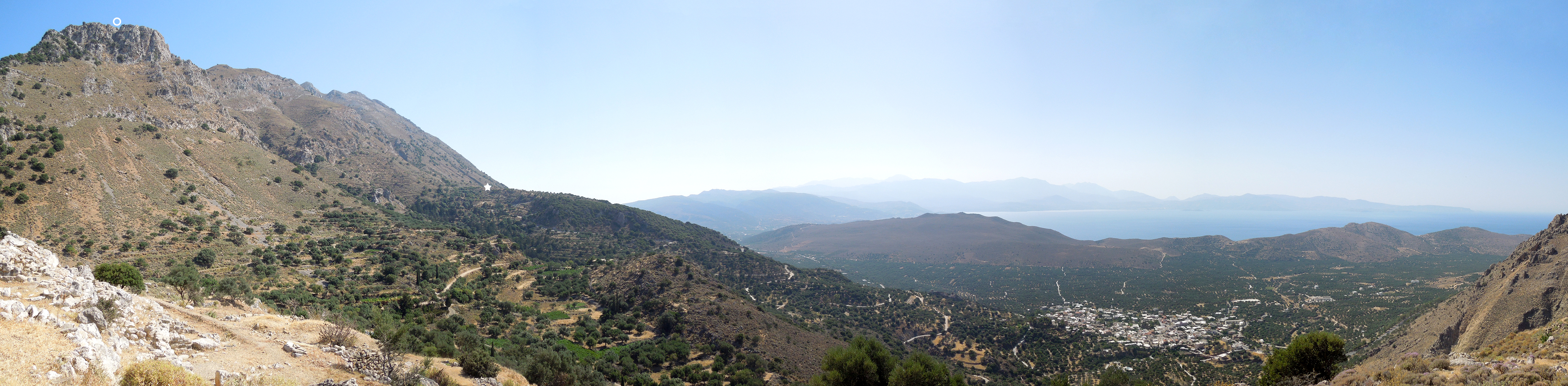
Panoramic view of the Kavousi area, looking west from the archaeological site of Azoria (2012). The location of Kavousi Kastro is indicated by a circle (at left); the location of Kavousi Vronda is indicated by a star. The modern village of Kavousi is visible in the plain below (at right).

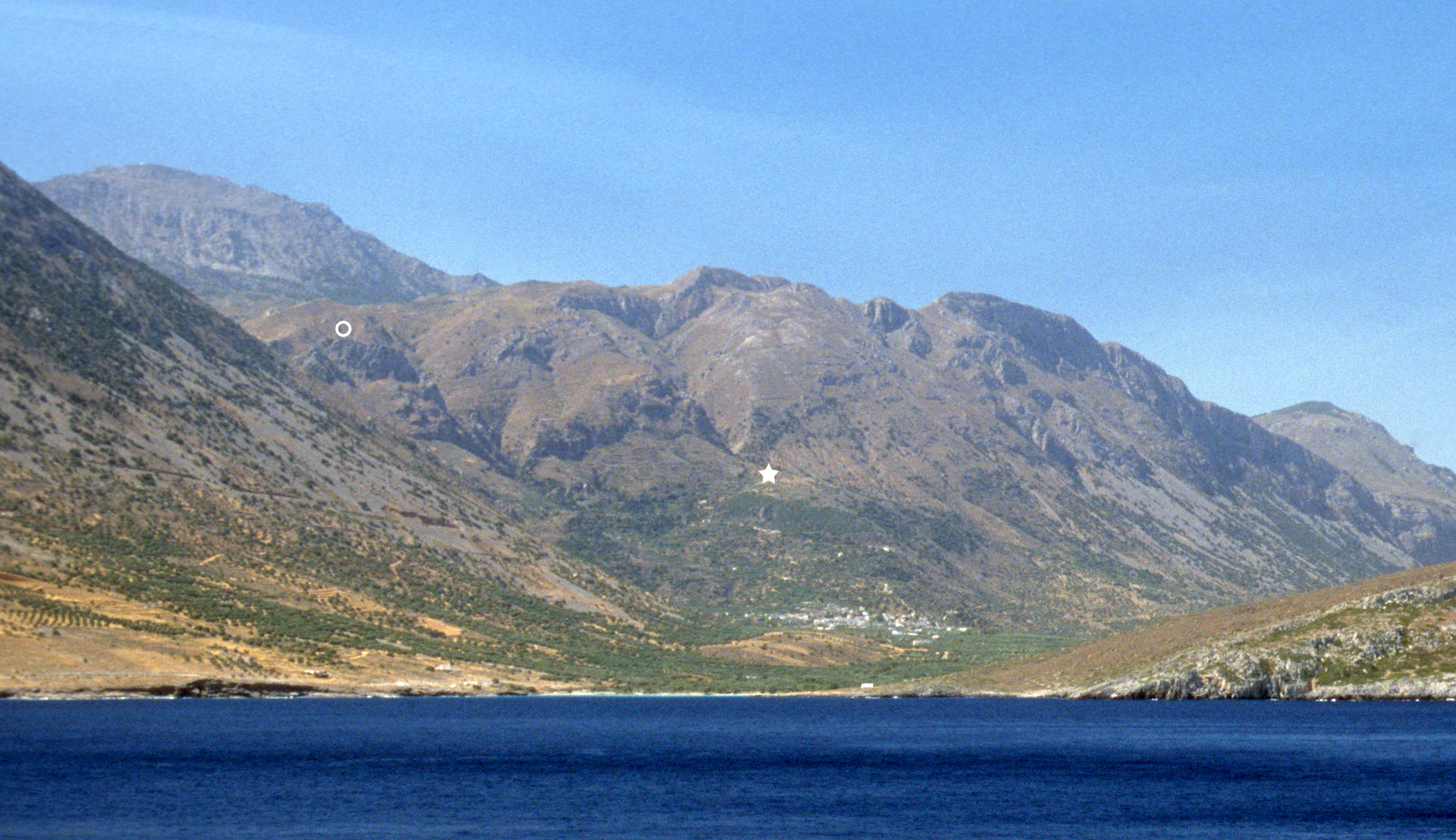
Kavousi as seen from the harbor of the Minoan settlement on Pseira island (from north). The location of Kavousi Vronda is indicated by a star; the location of Kavousi Kastro is indicated by a circle (2000).

- 1978: mapping of sites in the Kavousi area.
- 1979: study of material from a tholos tomb (now designated Vronda IX) discovered at Vronda by local landowner George Sekadakis in 1951 and housed in the archaeological collection of Ierapetra; study of material housed in the Herakleion Museum from tombs at Plaï tou Kastrou (pottery and metal object purchased by British archaeologist Arthur Evans in the late 19th century), Vronda, Chondrovolakes, Aloni, and Skouriasmenos (all excavated by American archaeologist Harriet Boyd [Hawes] in 1900–1901).
- 1981: cleaning of tholos tombs at Vronda, tombs at Aloni (southwest of the Kastro) and Ridopoulia (east of Kavousi village).
- 1982–1983: cleaning of Kastro in preparation for balloon photography for The Aerial Atlas of Ancient Crete; drawing of architectural remains and additional surveying on Kastro.
- 1983–1984: cleaning and mapping of architectural remains on Vronda.
- 1985: conference held in Ierapetra and Kavousi to present the current findings and develop interest in future excavations.
- 1986: study season.
- 1987–1990: large-scale, scientific excavations at both Vronda and Kastro.
- 1988–1990: diachronic archaeological survey (Kavousi-Thriphti Survey) of the Kavousi region conducted as a component of the Kavousi Project.
- 1991: study season.
- 1992: final season of excavation and cleaning at Vronda and Kastro.
- 1987–1992: pedological and geomorphological investigations in the Kavousi region conducted as a component of the Kavousi Project.
- 1993–1996: site conservation and consolidation at Vronda and Kastro.
- 1993–2003: study seasons.
- 2005–present: publication of the Kavousi Excavation Series by INSTAP Academic Press.

Today, select antiquities discovered by the Kavousi Project and Kavousi Excavations are on display in the Archaeological Museum of Agios Nikolaos and in the Archaeological Collection of Ierapetra. Other artifacts, notebooks, original drawings and plans, and photographic contact sheets are housed in the Institute for Aegean Prehistory Study Center for East Crete (INSTAP-SCEC) in Pacheia Ammos in eastern Crete, Greece. The primary photographic archives (black-and-white film negatives) are curated by the Department of Classics at the University of Tennessee (Knoxville); copies of color slides and some other materials are also preserved in the W.D.E. Coulson Archives and Library in the Department of History, Archaeology and Social Anthropology at the University of Thessaly (Volos, Greece).

== Archaeological Sites Investigated ==
=== Kavousi Vronda ===
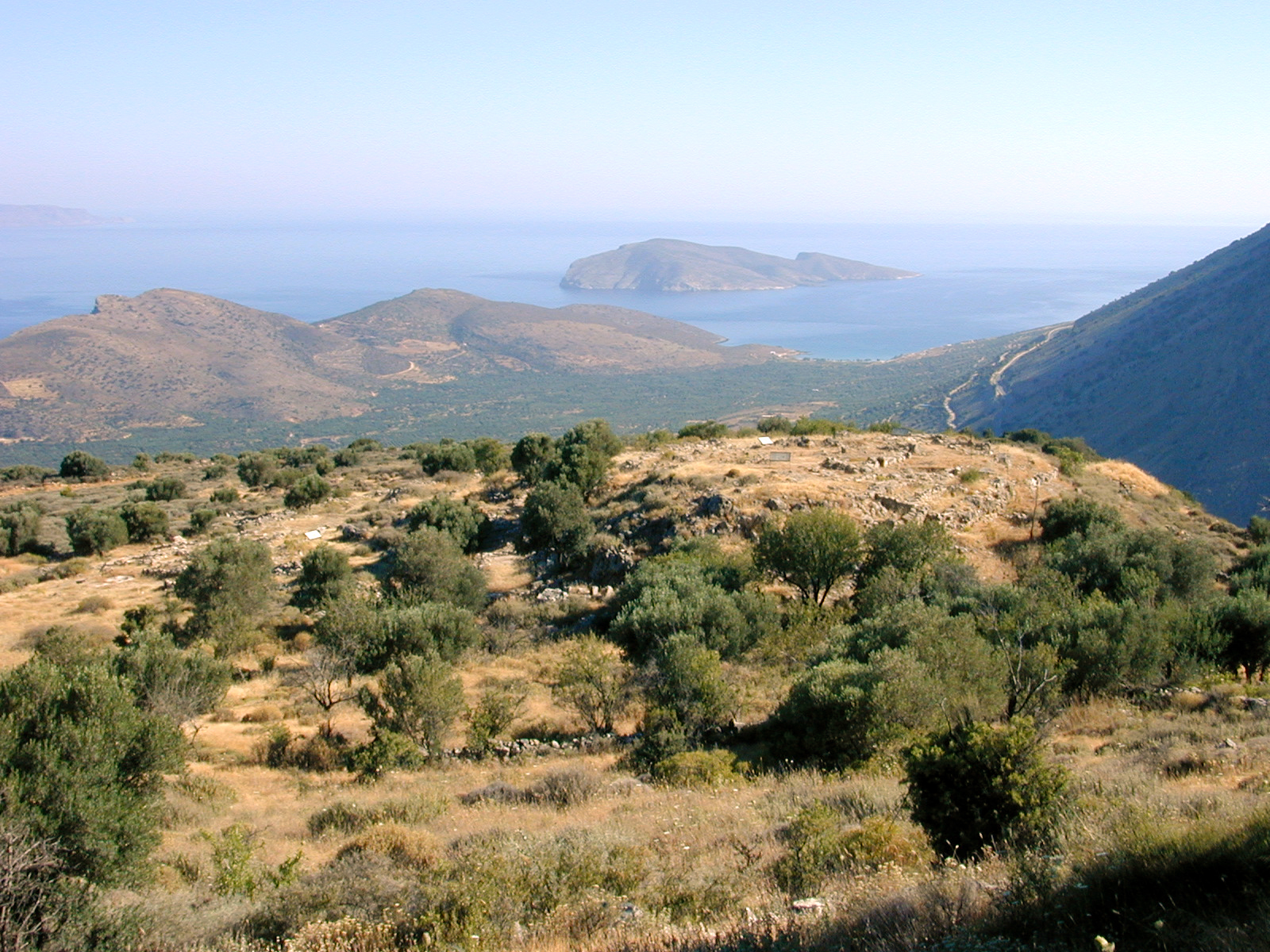
View of Kavousi Vronda from the south (2001), with the island of Pseira in the distance.

Settlement site, c. 427 meters above sea level, established slightly later than Kavousi Kastro and inhabited for up to four generations (around 120 years) before being abandoned at the very end of the Late Minoan IIIC period (c. 1050 BCE). Vronda ("Thunder Hill"; Greek: Βροντάς or Βρόντας) was briefly explored by Harriet Boyd [Hawes] in 1900 and extensively excavated by the Kavousi Project from 1987 to 1992. At its greatest extent, the Vronda settlement covered an area of at least 0.50 hectares and consisted of about 20 houses, a large "special status" building on the summit that may have been the home of the community leader and a place for ritual feasting and drinking ceremonies (Building A-B), a freestanding temple or shrine of the "Goddess with Upraised Arms" (Greek: θεά μεθ’ υψωμένων χειρών) (Building G), and a kiln. In the Subminoan–Protogeometric periods (late 11th and 10th centuries BCE) — and continuing until the early Geometric period (9th century BCE) — Vronda was used as a cemetery for inhumation burials in at least 11 small, stone-built and corbeled tholos tombs. Located at the northern and northwestern edges of the Late Minoan IIIC settlement, these tholos tombs may have been constructed by the descendants of the original villagers, some of whom most likely had moved to the higher settlement at Kavousi Kastro. In the Late Geometric–Orientalizing periods (8th to 7th centuries BCE), numerous stone-built enclosures (cists) for cremation burials were constructed within and around the long-abandoned and partially collapsed Late Minoan IIIC houses and shrine. As an extensively excavated settlement from a single period of occupation, Kavousi Vronda provides insights into domestic activities, architecture, religion, and social organization of a community at the very beginning of the Greek Dark Ages (Late Minoan IIIC, or 12th to 11 centuries BCE). Its later cemeteries, used by the inhabitants of Kavousi Kastro and/or nearby Azoria until the late-7th century BCE, attest to regional mortuary practices, rituals, and ideological concerns throughout the Early Iron Age.

=== Kavousi Kastro ===
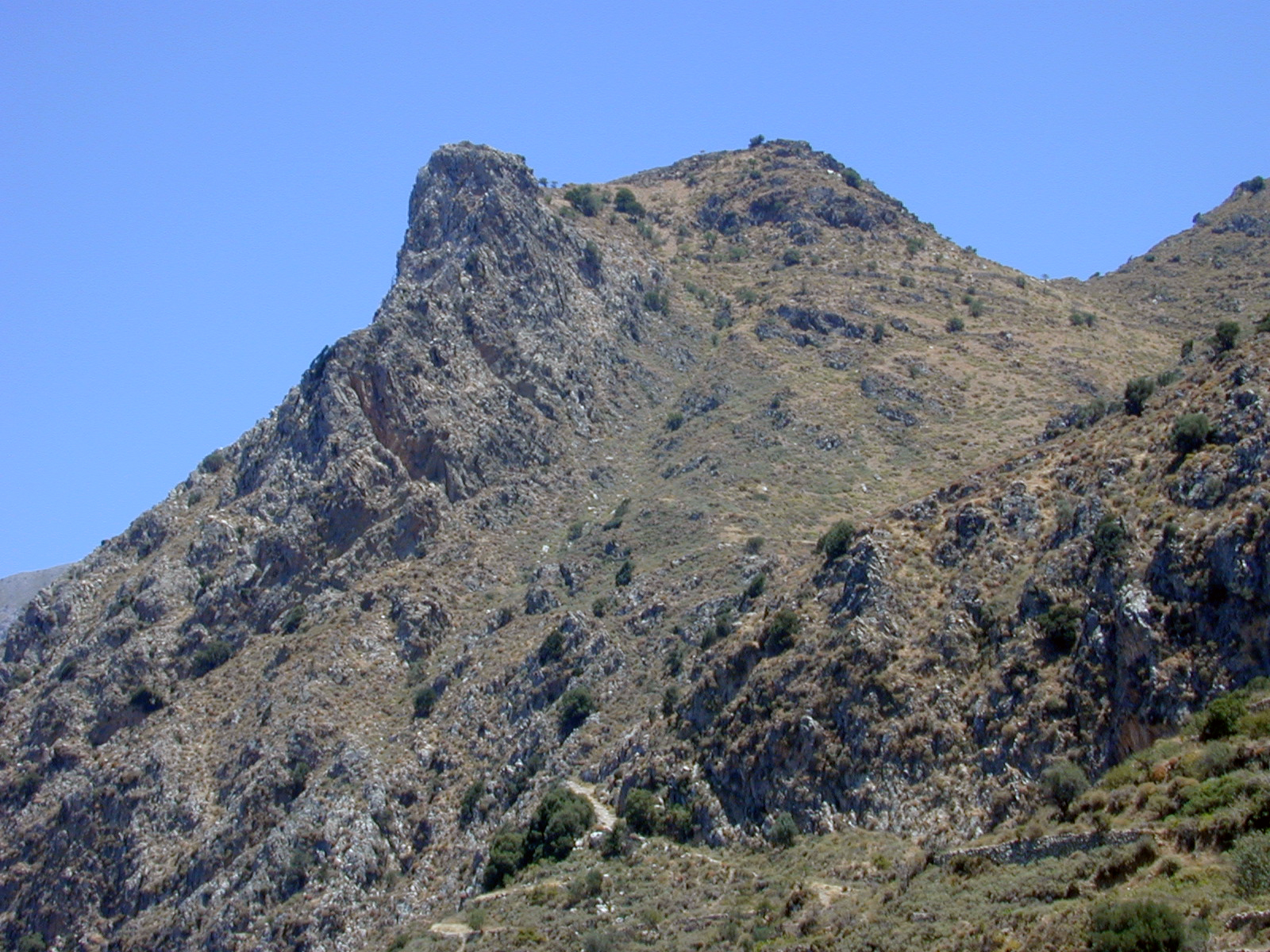
View of Kavousi Kastro, looking east from the summit of Kavousi Vronda (2002).

Settlement site, c. 713 meters above sea level, founded early in the Late Minoan IIIC period (12th century BCE) and continuously inhabited down to the Orientalizing period (late 7th century BCE), after which the site was abandoned. The Kastro ("Citadel" or "Castle"; Greek: Κάστρο) was briefly explored by Harriet Boyd [Hawes] in 1900 and extensively excavated by the Kavousi Project from 1987 to 1992. At its greatest extent, the settlement on the Kastro covered an area of at least 0.84 hectares. While most of the preserved architectural remains belong to the Late Geometric–Early Orientalizing phases (8th to 7th centuries BCE), there is ample evidence for the construction of walls, rooms, and houses in the Late Minoan IIIC and Protogeometric periods (12th to 10th centuries BCE), with renovations and additions over time. In particular, the Kastro settlement seems to have grown significantly at the end of the Late Minoan IIIC period. Since this is precisely the same time that the settlement at Kavousi Vronda was abandoned, it is likely that at least some of the population of Vronda was absorbed into the community at the Kastro. The Kastro may have become the dominant site in the Kavousi region from the 11th through the 8th centuries BCE. In the Late Geometric period (second half of the 8th century BCE), the excavated portion of the settlement included at least 21 houses, one of which (Building H) may have been a "special status" structure distinguished by its size and highly visible location on the western slope. Kavousi Kastro thus reveals a long sequence of occupation that provides insights into domestic activities, architecture, and social organization of a community throughout the entire Early Iron Age. Its well-preserved Late Geometric–Early Orientalizing (8th to 7th centuries BCE) settlement enhances our understanding of ancient society in a key period of Cretan history immediately before the transition to larger urban centers in the Archaic period (6th century BCE), such as at nearby Azoria.

=== Aloni (Skala) ===
Location of four tholos tombs, c. 300 meters southwest of Kavousi Kastro, originally excavated by Harriet Boyd [Hawes] and Blanche Wheeler in 1901 and reinvestigated by the Kavousi Project in 1981. The tombs at Aloni ("Threshing Floor"; Greek: Αλώνι), also known locally as Skala ("Stairway" or "Ladder"; Greek: Σκάλα) are now designated Aloni I–IV. Only three tombs (Aloni I, II, and IV) were still preserved in 1981. Ceramic remains suggest periods of use in the Subminoan–Protogeometric, Geometric, and Late Geometric–Early Orientalizing periods. Based on their location and period of use, it is likely that these tombs formed part of a cemetery used by inhabitants of Kavousi Kastro.

=== Plaï tou Kastrou ===
Location of at least one stone-built tholos tomb on a slope c. 200 meters south of Kavousi Kastro, from which the British archaeologist Arthur Evans had obtained antiquities in 1896 and 1899. The artifacts from the tomb at Plaï tou Kastrou ("Slope of the Kastro"; Greek: Πλάι του Κάστρου or Πλαγί του Κάστρου) date to the Subminoan–Early Protogeometric and Late Geometric–Early Orientalizing periods. Based on its location and period of use, it is likely that the tomb at Plaï tou Kastrou was used by inhabitants of Kavousi Kastro.

=== Skouriasmenos ===
Location of a well-built, stone tholos tomb, c. 500 meters southeast of Kavousi Kastro. Although the tomb at Skouriasmenos ("Rusty Ridge"; Greek: Σκουριασμένος) had been systematically robbed prior to 1900, the architecture of the tomb is particularly well-preserved. When Harriet Boyd [Hawes] visited the site in 1900, she found several vessels dating to the Late Geometric–Early Orientalizing period. Based on its architectural sophistication, location, period of use, and contents, it is likely that the Skouriasmenos tomb was used by an important family or individual from the settlement at Kavousi Kastro.

=== Ridopoulia ===
Three small rock-shelters containing burials east of the modern village of Kavousi, on a terrace known locally as Ridopoulia (Greek: Ριδοπουλιά). One rock-shelter (now designated Ridopoulia I), excavated by the Kavousi Project in 1981, had been previously robbed but contained fragments of Late Minoan III ceramics. Another rock shelter (Ridopoulia II) is said to have been cleared by a local landowner in the mid-20th century; a third tomb (Ridopoulia I) is said to have been excavated by a local landowner and American archaeologist Richard Seager in the early 20th century. Based on their location and period of use, it is likely that these tombs formed part of a cemetery used by a Late Minoan III settlement on the site of the modern Kavousi village.

== Kavousi Excavation Series ==
In addition to numerous preliminary reports and thematic studies in academic journals and edited books, the comprehensive results of the Kavousi Project appear in the specialized volumes of the Kavousi Excavation Series, all published by INSTAP Academic Press.

=== Published ===
- Kavousi I: The Archaeological Survey of the Kavousi Region (Prehistory Monographs 16), by Donald C. Haggis, with contributions by J.T. Ammons, P.M. Day, J.E. Foss, L. Joyner, E. Kiriatzi, M.S. Mook, M.W. Morris, M. Relaki, M.E. Timpson. Philadelphia, PA: INSTAP Academic Press 2005. ISBN 1931534187.
- Kavousi IIA: The Late Minoan IIIC Settlement at Vronda. The Buildings on the Summit (Prehistory Monographs 26), by Leslie Preston Day, Nancy L. Klein and Lee Ann Turner, with contributions by Heidi Dierckx, Kimberly Flint-Hamilton, Geraldine C. Gesell, David S. Reese, and Lynn M. Snyder. Philadelphia, PA: INSTAP Academic Press 2009. ISBN 9781931534512.
- Kavousi IIB: The Late Minoan IIIC Settlement at Vronda: The Buildings on the Periphery (Prehistory Monographs 39), by Leslie Preston Day and Kevin T. Glowacki, with contributions by Heidi Dierckx, Michael E. Evans, Kimberly Flint-Hamilton, Geraldine C. Gesell, David S. Reese, and Lynn M. Snyder. Philadelphia, PA: INSTAP Academic Press 2012. ISBN 9781931534697.
- Kavousi IIC: The Late Minoan IIIC Settlement at Vronda. The Specialist Reports and Analyses (Prehistory Monographs 52), by Leslie Preston Day, Heidi Dierckx, Kimberly Flint-Hamilton, Geraldine C. Gesell, Kevin T. Glowacki, Nancy L. Klein, David S. Reese, and Lynn M. Snyder, with contributions by Greg Hodgins. Philadelphia, PA: INSTAP Academic Press 2016. ISBN 9781931534840.
- Kavousi IV: The Cemetery at Vronda (Prehistory Monographs 71), by L.P. Day and M.A. Liston, with contributions by Kimberly Flint-Hamilton, Kevin T. Glowacki, Eleni Nodarou, Effie Photos-Jones, David S. Reese, Lynn M. Snyder, and Julie Unruh. Philadelphia: INSTAP Academic Press. ISBN 9789609439053.

=== In preparation ===
- Kavousi III. The Late Minoan IIIC Shrine at Vronda.
- Kavousi V. The Cemeteries on and around the Kastro.
- Kavousi VI. The Settlement on the Kastro (Northwest Building; Buildings on the North and East Slopes; Buildings on the West Slope; Specialists Reports).

== Select Bibliography ==
- Boyd, Harriet A. 1901. "Excavations at Kavousi, Crete, in 1900," American Journal of Archaeology Vol. 5, No. 2. (Apr.-Jun., 1901), pp. 125–157.
- Coulson, William D.E. 1998. "The Early Iron Age on the Kastro at Kavousi in East Crete," in Post-Minoan Crete: Proceedings of the First Colloquium on Post-Minoan Crete (British School at Athens Studies 2), pp. 40–44. Athens: British School at Athens. ISBN 0904887294
- Coulson, William D.E., Donald C. Haggis, Margaret S. Mook, and Jennifer L. Tobin. 1997. "Excavations on the Kastro at Kavousi: An Architectural Overview," Hesperia Vol. 66, No. 3 (Jul., 1997), pp. 315–390.
- Day, Leslie P. 2011. "Appropriating the Past: Early Iron Age Mortuary Practices at Kavousi, Crete," in The ‘Dark Ages’ Revisited: Proceedings of the International Conference in Memory of William D.E. Coulson at the University of Thessaly, Volos, Greece, June 14–17, 2007, edited by A. Mazarakis Ainian, pp. 745–757. Volos, Greece: University of Thessaly Press. ISBN 9789609439053
- Day, Leslie P., William D.E. Coulson, and Geraldine C. Gesell. 1986. "Kavousi 1983–84: The Settlement at Vronda." Hesperia Vol. 55, No. 4 (Oct., 1986), pp. 335–387.
- Day, Leslie P., Heidi Dierckx, Kimberly Flint-Hamilton, Geraldine C. Gesell, Kevin T. Glowacki, Nancy L. Klein, David S. Reese, and Lynn M. Snyder. 2016. Kavousi IIC: The LM IIIC Settlement at Vronda. The Specialist Reports. (Prehistory Monographs 52). Philadelphia, PA: INSTAP Academic Press, 2016. ISBN 9781931534840.
- Day, Leslie P., and Kevin T. Glowacki. 2012. Kavousi IIB: The Late Minoan IIIC Settlement at Vronda. The Buildings on the Summit (Prehistory Monographs 26). Philadelphia, PA: INSTAP Academic Press, 2012.
- Day, L.P., and M.A. Liston. 2023. Kavousi IV: The Cemetery at Vronda (Prehistory Monographs 71). Philadelphia: INSTAP Academic Press. ISBN 978-1-931534-36-9
- Day, Leslie P., Nancy L. Klein, and Lee Ann Turner. 2009. Kavousi IIA: The Late Minoan IIIC Settlement at Vronda. The Buildings on the Periphery (Prehistory Monographs 39). Philadelphia, PA: INSTAP Academic Press, 2009.
- Gesell, Geraldine C., William D.E. Coulson, and Leslie P. Day. 1991. "Excavations at Kavousi, Crete, 1988," Hesperia Vol. 60, No. 2 (Apr., 1991), pp. 145–177.
- Gesell, Geraldine C., Leslie P. Day, and William D.E. Coulson. 1983. "Excavations and Survey at Kavousi, 1978-1981," Hesperia Vol. 52, No. 4 (Oct., 1983), pp. 389–420.
- Gesell, Geraldine C., Leslie P. Day, and William D.E. Coulson. 1988. "Excavations at Kavousi, Crete, 1987," Hesperia Vol. 57, No. 4 (Oct., 1988), pp. 279–301.
- Gesell, Geraldine C., Leslie P. Day, and William D.E. Coulson. 1985. "Kavousi, 1982-83: The Kastro," Hesperia Vol. 54, No. 4 (Oct., 1985), pp. 327–355.
- Gesell, Geraldine C., Leslie P. Day, and William D.E. Coulson. 1992. "Kavousi," in The Aerial Atlas of Ancient Crete, edited by J.W. Myers, E.E. Myers, and G. Cadogan 1992, pp. 120–123. Los Angeles, CA: University of California Press. ISBN 0520073827.
- Gesell, Geraldine C., Leslie P. Day, and William D.E. Coulson. 1995. "Excavations at Kavousi, Crete, 1989 and 1990," Hesperia Vol. 64, No. 1 (Jan., 1995), pp. 67–120.
- Haggis, Donald C. 2005. Kavousi I: The Archaeological Survey of the Kavousi Region (Prehistory Monographs 16). Philadelphia, PA: INSTAP Academic Press, 2005. ISBN 1931534187
- Haggis, Donald C., and Margaret S. Mook. 1993. "The Kavousi Coarse Wares: A Bronze Age Chronology for Survey in the Mirabello Area, East Crete," American Journal of Archaeology Vol. 97, No. 2 (1993), pp. 265–293.
- Morris, Michael W. 2002. Soil Science and Archaeology: Three Test Cases from Minoan Crete (Prehistory Monographs 4). Philadelphia, PA: INSTAP Academic Press, 2002. ISBN 9781931534031
