= Kavousi Kastro =

Archaeological site in Crete, Greece

Coordinates: 35.111076°N 25.867885°E

Kavousi Kastro (also Kastro; Greek: Κάστρο) is an archaeological site in eastern Crete, Greece, about 1.4 km southeast of the modern village of Kavousi, a historic village in the municipality of Ierapetra in the prefecture of Lasithi.

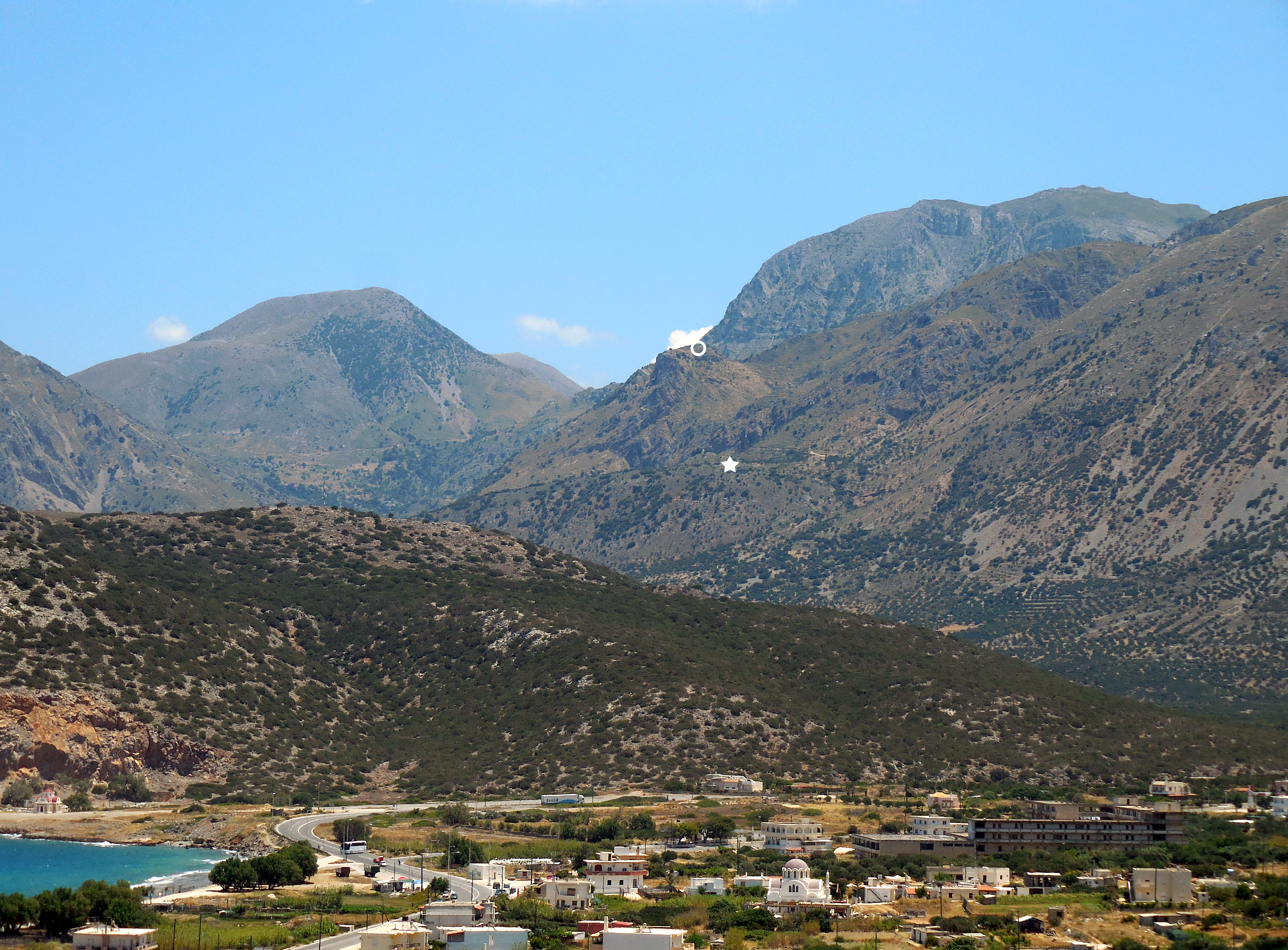
View of Kavousi Kastro looking east from the Institute for Aegean Prehistory Study Center for East Crete in Pacheia Ammos (2014). The location of the archaeological site is indicated by a circle; the location of Kavousi Vronda is indicated by a star.

Situated on a steep and rocky peak at an elevation of 713 m above sea level in the northern foothills of the Thripti Mountains, the site overlooks the Gulf of Mirabello and the northern Isthmus of Ierapetra. “Kastro” (“Citadel“ or “Castle”) is a local toponym; the ancient name of the site is unknown. The Kastro is best known as a defensible “refuge” settlement of the “Greek Dark Ages”, inhabited from the early 12th to the mid-7th centuries BCE. Most of the visible architectural remains on the site belong to the Late Geometric–Early Orientalizing phases of occupation (8th to 7th centuries BCE).

== History of the site ==
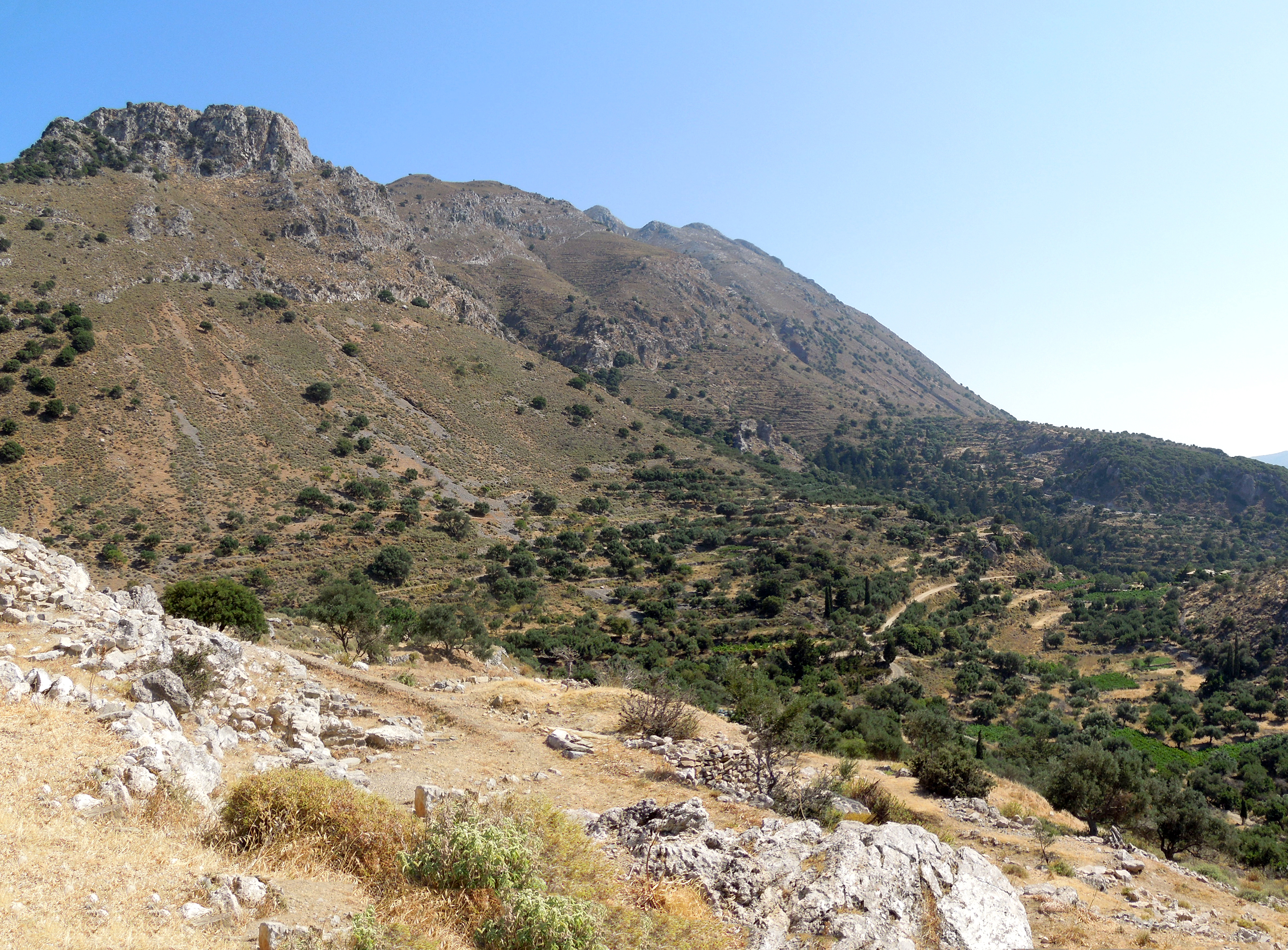
View of Kavousi Kastro and Kavousi Vronda, looking south-southwest from the archaeological site of Azoria (2012).

Investigations by the Kavousi Project have demonstrated that a settlement on the Kastro was occupied continuously from its foundation early in the Late Minoan IIIC period (12th century BCE), through the Protogeometric (10th century BCE), Geometric (9th-8th centuries BCE) and Orientalizing (7th century BCE) periods, after which the site was abandoned. Its long sequence of continuous occupation and stratified remains of architecture, floor surfaces, fills, and ceramic deposits provide important insights into domestic activities, architecture, and social organization of a community throughout the entire Early Iron Age, but before the transition to larger urban centers in the Archaic period (6th century BCE), such as at nearby Azoria.

== Archaeological research ==
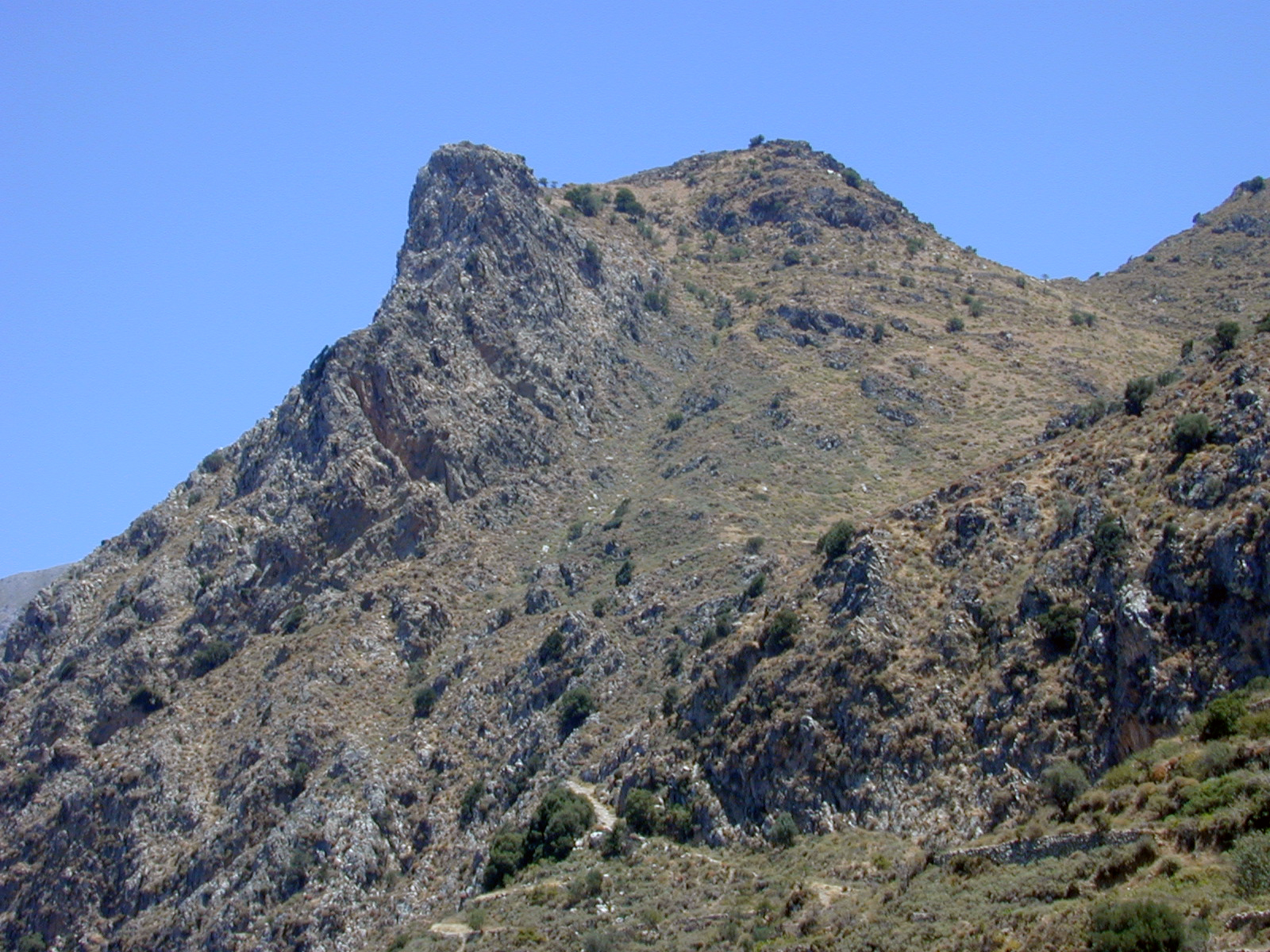
View of Kavousi Kastro, looking east from the summit of Kavousi Vronda (2002).

The site was briefly explored in 1900 by the American archaeologist Harriet Boyd [Hawes], who discovered 13 rooms of what she thought was the house of “an early chieftain”, but now interpreted as multiple, separate house complexes spread across several terraces. The Kavousi Project, directed by Geraldine C. Gesell (University of Tennessee), Leslie Preston Day (College of Wooster; later, Wabash College), and William D.E. Coulson (University of Minnesota; later, American School of Classical Studies at Athens), cleaned the site in 1982 in preparation for balloon photography for The Aerial Atlas of Ancient Crete. Additional surveying of the site in 1983 provided positive indications that the settlement was much more extensive than previously thought. Full-scale excavations under the auspices of the American School of Classical Studies at Athens and the 24th Ephorate of Prehistoric and Classical Antiquities of the Greek Archaeological Service, and with permission from the Greek Ministry of Culture, were conducted at both Kavousi Kastro and Kavousi Vronda from 1987–1990 and in 1992, followed by site conservation from 1993 to 1996, and study from 1990 to 2003.

Today, select antiquities discovered by the Kavousi Project at Kastro are on display in the Archaeological Museum of Agios Nikolaos and in the Archaeological Collection of Ierapetra. Other artifacts, excavation notebooks, and original drawings and plans, are housed in the Institute for Aegean Prehistory Study Center for East Crete (INSTAP-SCEC) in Pacheia Ammos in eastern Crete.

== Bibliography ==
- Boyd, Harriet A. 1901. “Excavations at Kavousi, Crete, in 1900,” American Journal of Archaeology Vol. 5, No. 2. (Apr. - Jun., 1901), pp. 125–157.]
- Coulson, William D.E. 1998. “The Early Iron Age on the Kastro at Kavousi in East Crete,” in Post-Minoan Crete: Proceedings of the First Colloquium on Post-Minoan Crete (British School at Athens Studies 2), pp. 40–44. Athens: British School at Athens. ISBN 0904887294.
- Coulson, William D.E., Donald C. Haggis, Margaret S. Mook, and Jennifer L. Tobin. 1997. “Excavations on the Kastro at Kavousi: An Architectural Overview,” Hesperia Vol. 66, No. 3 (Jul.-Sep., 1997), pp. 315–390.
- Day, Leslie P. 2011. “Appropriating the Past: Early Iron Age Mortuary Practices at Kavousi, Crete,” in The ‘Dark Ages’ Revisited: Proceedings of the International Conference in Memory of William D.E. Coulson at the University of Thessaly, Volos, Greece, June 14–17, 2007, edited by A. Mazarakis Ainian, pp. 745–757. Volos, Greece: University of Thessaly Press. ISBN 9789609439053.
- Gesell, Geraldine C., William D.E. Coulson, and Leslie P. Day. 1991. “Excavations at Kavousi, Crete, 1988,” Hesperia Vol. 60, No. 2 (Apr., 1991), pp. 145–177.
- Gesell, Geraldine C., Leslie P. Day, and William D.E. Coulson. 1985. “Kavousi 1982–1983: The Kastro,” Hesperia Vol. 54, No. 4 (Oct.-Dec., 1985) pp. 327–355.
- Gesell, Geraldine C., Leslie P. Day, and William D.E. Coulson. 1988. “Excavations at Kavousi, Crete, 1987.” Hesperia Vol. 57, No. 4 (Oct., 1988), pp. 279–301.
- Gesell, Geraldine C., Leslie P. Day, and William D.E. Coulson. 1992. “Kavousi,” in The Aerial Atlas of Ancient Crete, edited by J.W. Myers, E.E. Myers, and G. Cadogan 1992, pp. 120–123. Los Angeles, CA: University of California Press. ISBN 0520073827.
- Gesell, Geraldine C., Leslie P. Day, and William D.E. Coulson. 1995. “Excavations at Kavousi, Crete, 1989 and 1990.” Hesperia Vol. 64, No. 1 (Jan., 1995), pp. 67–120.
- Haggis, Donald C. 2005. Kavousi I: The Archaeological Survey of the Kavousi Region (Prehistory Monographs 16), Philadelphia, PA: INSTAP Academic Press, 2005. ISBN 9781931534017.
- Mook, Margaret S. 1998. “Early Iron Age domestic architecture: the Northwest Building on the Kastro at Kavousi,” in Post-Minoan Crete: Proceedings of the First Colloquium on Post-Minoan Crete (British School at Athens Studies 2), pp. 45–57. Athens: British School at Athens. ISBN 0904887294.
- Mook, Margaret S. 2011. “The Settlement on the Kastro at Kavousi in the Late Geometric Period,” in The ‘Dark Ages’ Revisited: Proceedings of the International Conference in Memory of William D.E. Coulson at the University of Thessaly, Volos, Greece, June 14–17, 2007, edited by A. Mazarakis Ainian, pp. 477–488. Volos, Greece: University of Thessaly Press. ISBN 9789609439053.
- Mook, Margaret S., and William D.E. Coulson. 1997. "Late Minoan IIIC Pottery from the Kastro at Kavousi,” in Late Minoan III Pottery: Chronology and Terminology (Monographs of the Danish Institute at Athens 1), edited by E. Hallager and B.P. Hallager, pp. 337–370. Athens: Danish Institute at Athens. ISBN 9788772887319.
