= Azoria =

Archaeological site in Crete, Greece

Coordinates: 35.1178°N 25.8667°E

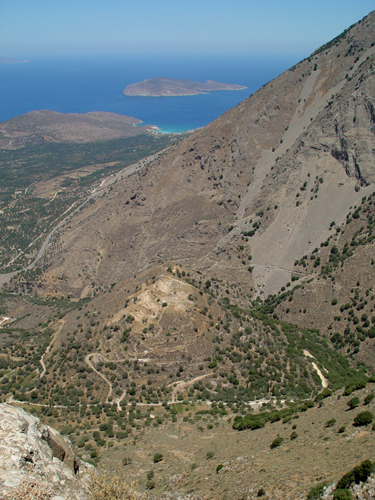
View of Azoria from the Kastro with the Kavousi plain and Bay of Mirabello, with the island of Pseira, in the background

Azoria is an archaeological site on a double-peaked hill overlooking the Gulf of Mirabello in eastern Crete in the Greek Aegean. "Azoria" (o Αζοριάς or (c. 1900) Μουρί τ' Αζωργιά) is a local toponym, not apparently an ancient place name or epigraphically-attested Greek city. Located about 1 km southeast of the modern village of Kavousi, and 3 km from the sea, the site occupies a topographically strategic position (c. 365 m above sea level) between the north Isthmus of Ierapetra and the Siteia Mountains.

== History ==
The Azoria Project excavations have recovered evidence of an Archaic Greek city, established c. 600 BC, following a long period of continuous occupation throughout the Early Iron Age or Greek Dark Age (1200–700 BC) and Early Archaic (700–600 BC) (or Orientalizing) periods. The city was destroyed by fire early in the 5th century BC, to be subsequently reoccupied on a limited scale c. 200 BC—probably a single tower constructed on the peak of the South Acropolis.

== Excavation ==
The location was originally explored by the American archaeologist, Harriet Boyd-Hawes, in 1900, as part of an extensive campaign of excavations conducted in eastern Crete by the American School of Classical Studies at Athens, including work at the sites of Vronda, Kastro, Tholos, Kephalolimnos (Khordakia), Avgo, Skala, and Skouriasmenos. At Azoria, Boyd excavated a single trench on the summit of the southernmost peak, finding a puzzling series of circular structures superimposed on a large rectangular building. In her 1901 article, she reported finding "latest Mycenaean" and "early Geometric" pottery associated with the earliest levels of the trench, as well as material she attributed to Orientalizing and Hellenistic periods.

=== Azoria Project ===
Work of the American School of Classical Studies resumed at the site in 2002, beginning an initial five-year excavation campaign, called the Azoria Project. Tracing the growth of the Azoria settlement from the Bronze Age until its establishment as a regional centre in the Early Iron Age, the focus of the project has been the study of the 6th-century BC urban centre.

Two aims of recent excavations at Azoria have been to understand the early history of the site and to explore stratigraphically the changes in the form of the settlement in the transition from the Early Iron Age (or Greek Dark Age) (Late Minoan IIIC-Late Geometric; c. 1200–700 BC) and Orientalizing (c. 700–600 BC) to Archaic periods (c. 600–500 BC). Excavation has identified stratification (archaeology) showing a distinct phase of architectural renovation involving significant changes in the way that the settlement was used and how public and private space was organized. This transition appears to have occurred sometime in the early 6th century BC. In foundation deposits of buildings it is difficult to identify material later than 600 BC, suggesting that changes to the settlement had occurred by the end of Late Orientalizing (c. 640–600 BC). In this phase transition, there is evidence for broad-sweeping alterations to the landscape of the site, the construction of monumental buildings, and the reorganization of both civic and domestic space, suggesting aspects of town planning.

The current work at the site is conducted by the Department of Classics of the University of North Carolina at Chapel Hill and the Program in Classical Studies at Iowa State University in collaboration with the Institute for Aegean Prehistory Study Center for East Crete, under the auspices of the American School of Classical Studies at Athens and the Ephorate of Prehistoric and Classical Antiquities of the Greek Archaeological Service (General Directorate of Antiquities of the Greek Ministry of Culture).

The Azoria Project excavations have been funded with grants from the National Endowment for the Humanities, National Science Foundation, National Geographic Society, Loeb Classical Library Foundation, American Philosophical Society, Institute for Aegean Prehistory, and the Wenner-Gren Foundation for Anthropological Research.

== Remains ==
Although the site has a long history of use—occupied in the Final Neolithic, Bronze Age, and Early Iron Age—the most visible remains are the houses and communal buildings of Archaic date (600–500 BC). The public buildings of Archaic date cluster close to the peak on the west and south sides of the South Acropolis and cover a total area of over 0.60 hectares. Each produced evidence of destruction and abandonment in the early 5th century BC. This destruction marks the end of the city's life and a long period of occupation. The Archaic rebuilding expanded the settlement to its maximum size (c. 15 hectares), created a zone of communal buildings on the upper west slope of the South Acropolis, and formalized what can be called civic architecture—generally supra-household communal spaces accommodating a variety of possible activities and configurations of groups.

Among the Archaic remains is a multi-room structure called the Communal Dining Building, which the excavators have interpreted as a possible andreion—a dining hall used for corporate syssitia, the communal mess of the city's male citizenry organized in hetairiai; and the Monumental Civic Building, a large hall, about 200 square metres in internal area, with a stepped bench built against the walls on the interior, and an adjoining two-room shrine.

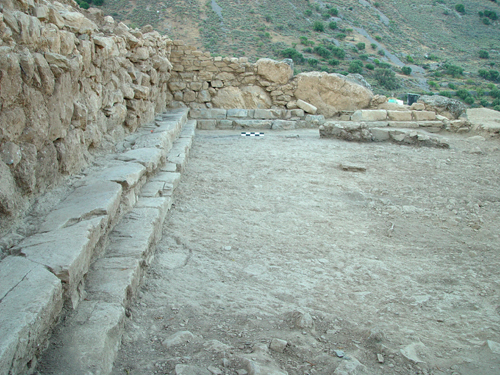
Monumental Civic Building at Azoria

Both the Communal Dining Building and Monumental Civic Building were supplied by adjacent service complexes, comprising multiple store rooms (with food provisions stored in decorated pithoi) and kitchens equipped with large stone-lined hearths. The Service Building of the Monumental Civic Building also contained a well-preserved olive press facility—the earliest documented lever-and-weights press, or beam press, in the post-Bronze Age Aegean. Although an Archaic beam press has been reported from excavations at the Greek city of Klazomenai, the evidence for olive pressing at Azoria includes a press bench, press beds, sockets for wooden beams, a press weight, roller-crusher and mortar block, a collection basin, a small trapetum mortarium, a hearth and cooking stand, oil-separation vessels, and quantities of press cake (crushed olive pits, collected after grinding and pressing for use as fuel for hearths).

Pots inscribed in Greek (both inscriptions and graffiti) are found within the building. An interesting find from the olive-press room is a reused pithos rim with its handles inscribed with the Eteocretan inscription ΞΡΤΑΚ.

The Communal Dining Building had at least three store rooms (with remains of grapes, olives and grains), three kitchens, and three dining rooms (extant). The floor of the building is littered with food debris, drinking and dining wares, and large decorated krater stands, and bronze armor. A separate room had a ground altar with burned food debris, evidently used for regular chthonic sacrifices. It has been argued that in Cretan cities, the activities of the domestic or private symposium, typical of Archaic Athenian contexts, were transferred to supra-household communal but segregated feasting venues such as the andreion.

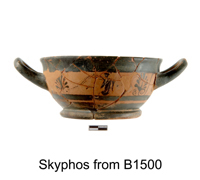
Black-figure skyphos (drinking cup) from a kitchen in the Service Building

The shrine of the Monumental Civic Building is equipped with a curbed hearth and altar on which were found a variety of terracotta votive female figurines (stylistically dated to 8th and 7th centuries BC), votive stands and vessels, and food offerings. The finds from the main hall of the Monumental Civic Building—roasted leg joints of sheep and goat; chick peas and legumes (found preserved in pots on the floor); drinking and dining wares; stone kernoi (offering tables) carved into the top step of the bench, and a Minoan-style kernos lying face down on top of the bench—indicate that it was used for public banquets and formal cult activities; it may have had ceremonial functions similar to those associated with magistrates' buildings (prytaneion) commonly identified in Greek city-states such as the neighboring poleis of Lato and Dreros.

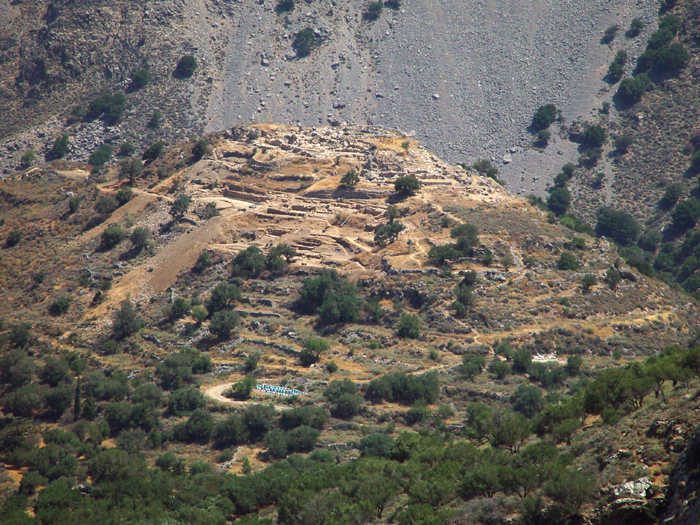
View of Azoria from Southwest

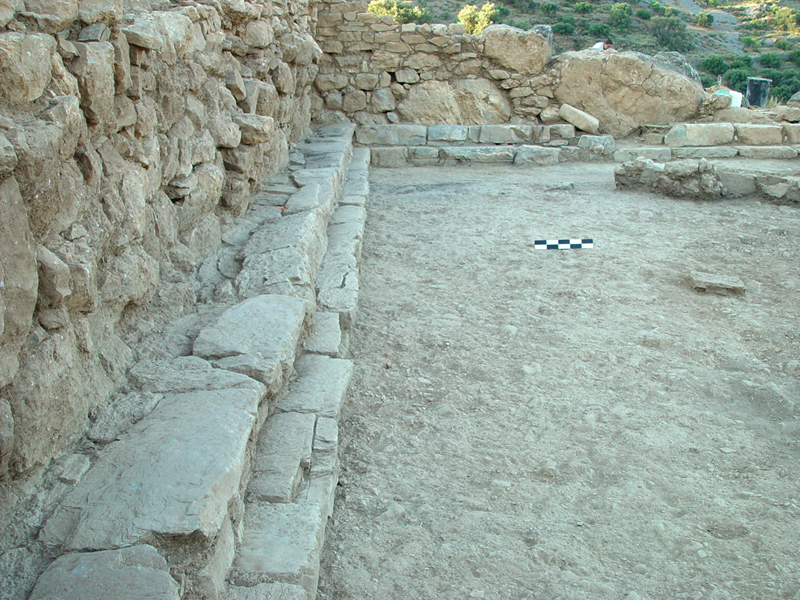
Interior of Monumental Civic Building from north

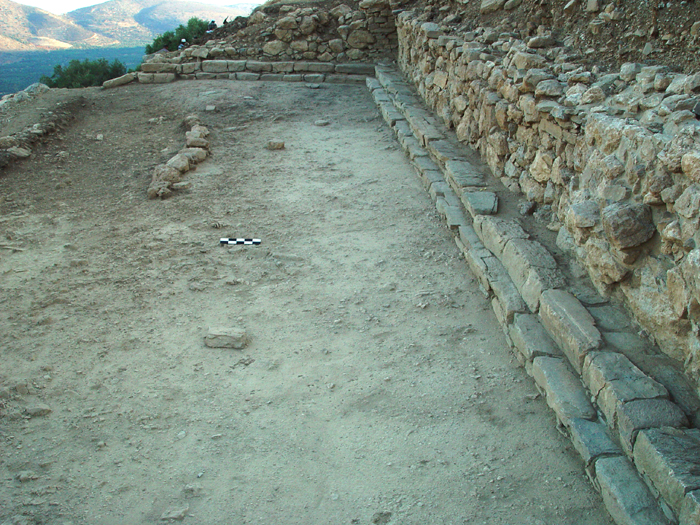
Interior of Monumental Civic Building from south

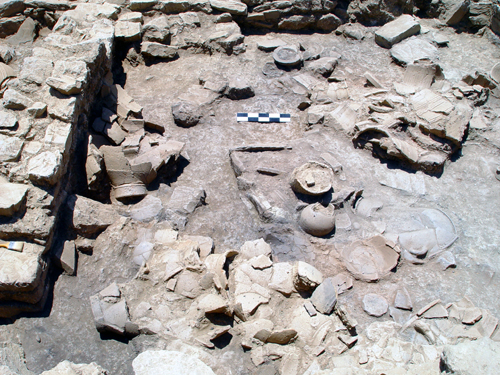
Destruction (early 5th century BC) deposit in a kitchen (B1500) of the Service Building

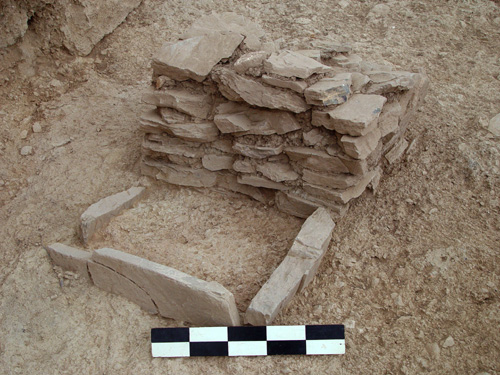
Altar in the Archaic Shrine of the Monumental Civic Building

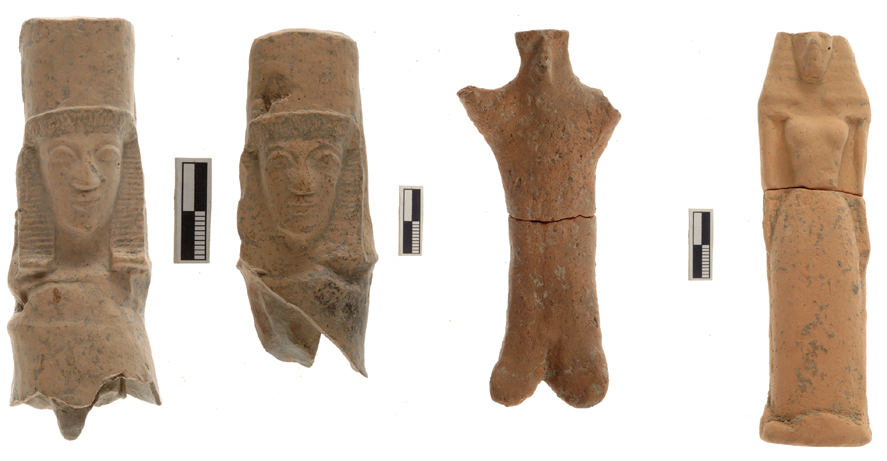
Terracotta Votive figurines from the altar of Archaic Shrine

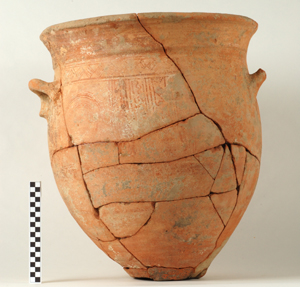
Protogeometric krater from the kitchen of the Archaic Shrine

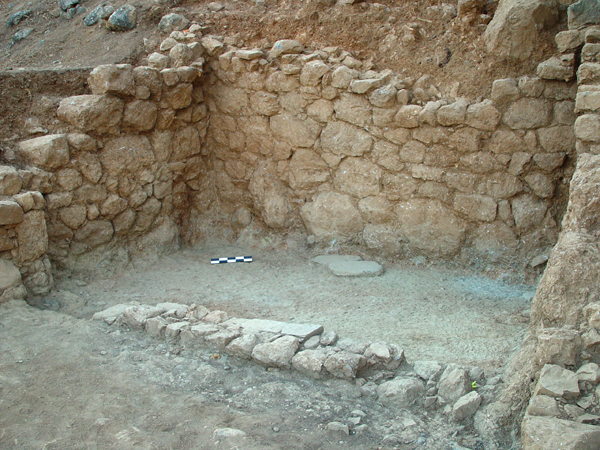
Interior of a storeroom of a house (Northwest Building)

== Bibliography ==
- Azoria Project Bibliography
- Boyd, H.A. 1901. "Excavations at Kavousi, Crete, in 1900", American Journal of Archaeology 5, 125–157.
- Boyd, H.A. 1904. "Gournia. Report of the American Exploration Society's Excavations at Gournia, Crete, 1902-1905", in Transactions of the Department of Archaeology: Free Museum of Science and Art University of Pennsylvania I, Philadelphia, 7–44.
- Haggis, D.C., M.S. Mook, R.D. Fitzsimons, C.M. Scarry, L.M.Snyder, and W.C. West, "Excavations in the Archaic Civic Buildings at Azoria in 2005-2006", Hesperia 80 (2011) 1–70.
- Haggis, D.C., M.S. Mook, C.M. Scarry, L.M. Snyder, and W.C. West. 2004. "Excavations at Azoria, 2002", Hesperia 73, 339–400.
- Haggis, D.C., M.S. Mook, and Μανόλης Ι. Στεφανάκης. 2007. "Τρώτε και πίνετε άρχοντες: Καταναλωτικές ανάγκες, πολιτική δύναμη και κοινωνική ταυτότητα στον αρχαϊκό οικισμό του Αζοριά", Kritiko Panorama (Κρητικό Πανόραμα) 19 (January–February 2007), 78–9.
- Haggis, D.C., M.S. Mook, L.M. Snyder, and T. Carter. 2007. "Excavations at Azoria 2003-2004, Part 2, The Early Iron Age, Late Prepalatial and Final Neolithic Occupation", Hesperia 76, 665–716.
- Haggis, D.C., M.S. Mook, C.M. Scarry, L.M. Snyder, R.D. Fitzsimons, E. Stephanakis, and W.C. West. 2007. "Excavations at Azoria 2003-2004, Part 1, The Archaic Civic Complex", Hesperia 76, 243–321.
- Small, D.B. 2010. "The Archaic Polis of Azoria: A Window into Cretan 'Polital' Social Structure", Journal of Mediterranean Archaeology 23.2, 197–217.
- Wallace, S. 2010. Ancient Crete: From Successful Collapse to Democracy's Alternatives, Twelfth to Fifth Centuries BC (Cambridge: Cambridge University Press 2010).
- Whitley, J. 2009. "Crete", in A Companion to Archaic Greece, ed. K. A. Raaflaub and H. van Wees, West Sussex, 273–293.
- Whitley, J. 2009. "Archaeology", in The Oxford Handbook of Hellenic Studies, ed. G. Boys-Stones, B. Graziosi, and P. Vasunia, Oxford, 720–733.
