= Kavousi Vronda =

Archaeological site in Ierapetra Municipality, Greece

Coordinates: 35.110021°N 25.858300°E

Kavousi Vronda (also Vronda; Greek: Βροντάς or Βρόντας) is an archaeological site in eastern Crete, Greece, located about 1.25 km south of the modern village of Kavousi, a historic village in the municipality of Ierapetra in the prefecture of Lasithi.

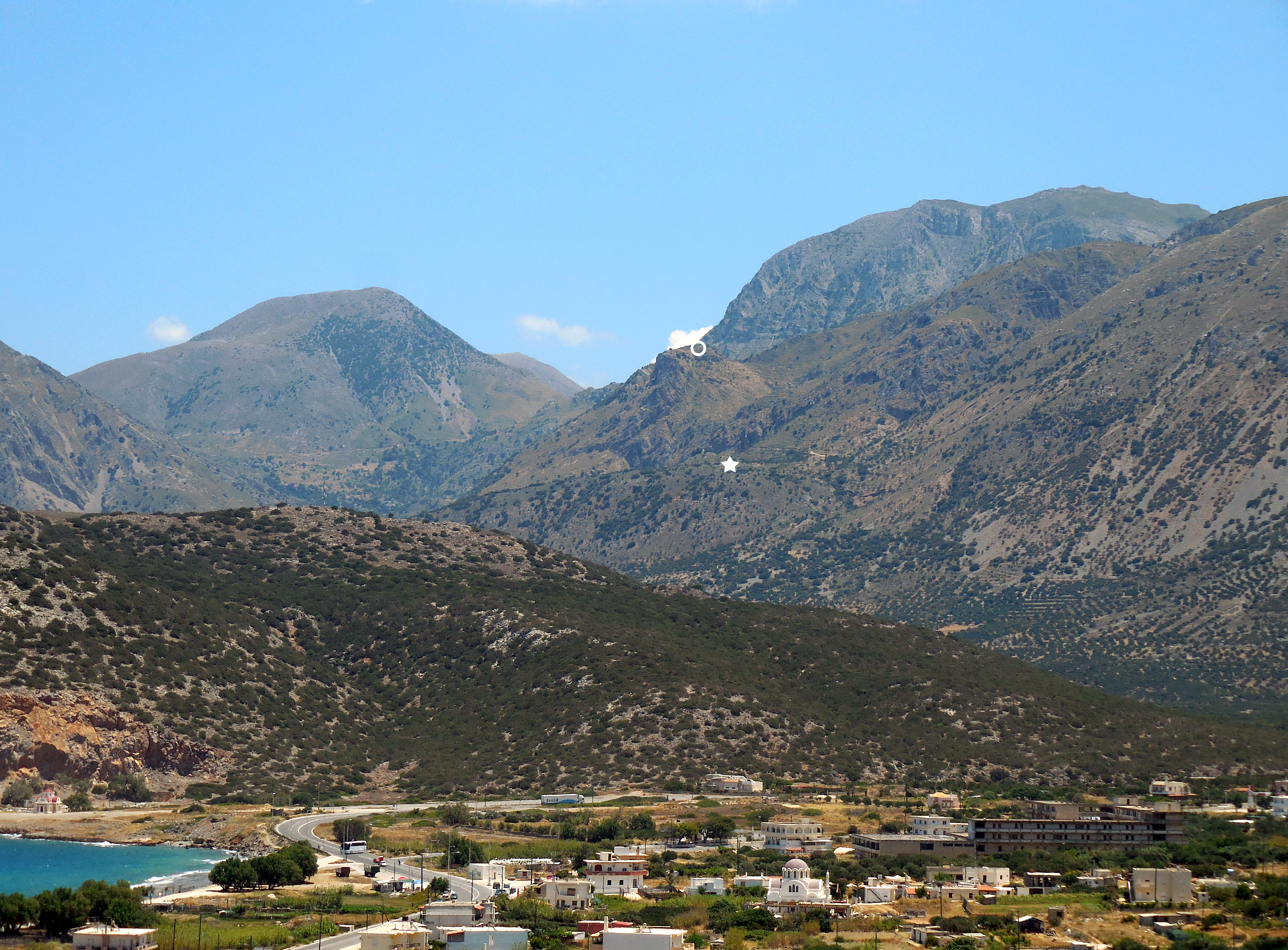
View of Kavousi Vronda looking east from the Institute for Aegean Prehistory Study Center for East Crete in Pacheia Ammos (2014). The location of the archaeological site is indicated by a star; the location of Kavousi Kastro is indicated by a circle.

It is situated in the northern foothills of the Thripti Mountains overlooking the Gulf of Mirabello, at an elevation of 427 m above sea level. The ancient name of the site is unknown. "Vronda" ("Thunder Hill"), as it was called by the pioneering archaeologist Harriet Boyd [Hawes] at the beginning of the 20th century, is a local toponym; the entire ridge and surrounding area are also referred to as "Xerambela" ("Dry Vineyards"; Greek: Ξεράμπελα). Most of the visible remains on the site belong to a "Dark Age" settlement dating to the Late Minoan IIIC period (c. 1170–1050 BCE) and a slightly later, Early Iron Age cemetery (c. 1050–600 BCE).

== History of the site ==
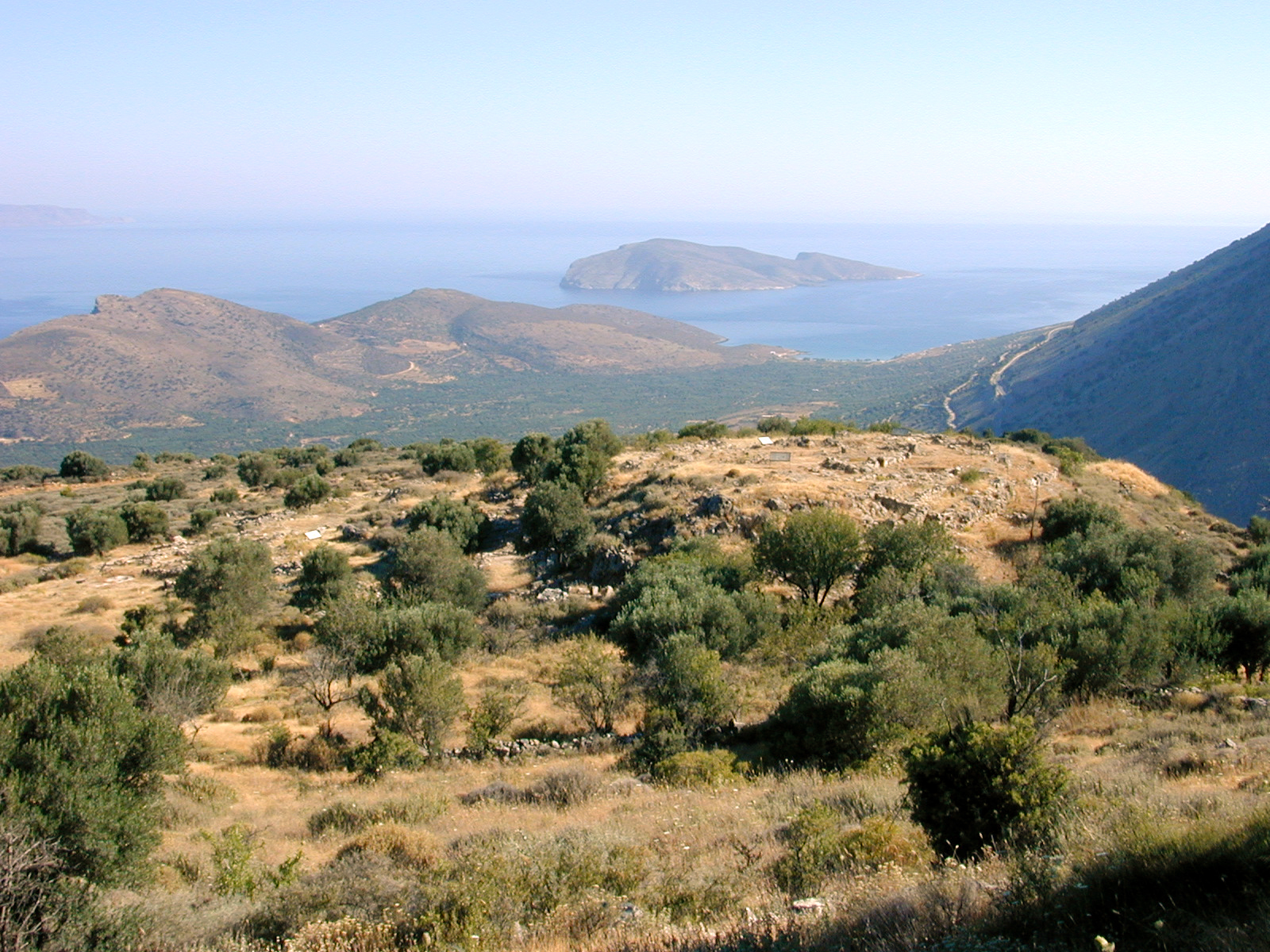
View of Kavousi Vronda from the south (2001), with the island of Pseira in the distance.

Investigations by the Kavousi Project have recovered evidence of human activity on the Vronda ridge as early as the Final Neolithic period (4th millennium BCE) and continuing, with interruptions, through the end of the Bronze Age (3rd and 2nd millennia BCE) and transition to the Iron Age (1st millennium BCE). Later remains attest to limited occupation and use of the site during the Venetian (13th–17th centuries C.E.), Ottoman (17th–19th centuries C.E.) and even Modern (early 20th century C.E) periods.

- The earliest traces of human activity at the site date to the Final Neolithic period, and consist of two stone celts and several fragments of pottery. Although not found in primary contexts or undisturbed strata, the amount of pottery suggests some type of small-scale habitation (e.g., a farmhouse, 1-2 isolated dwellings, etc.) at Vronda during this period.
- Occupation of the site during the Prepalatial (Early Minoan I-II) and Late Prepalatial (Early Minoan III–Middle Minoan IA) periods is attested primarily by substantial amounts of ceramic material deposited as fill during the construction of later buildings. Although no architectural remains are preserved from the Prepalatial period, the types and quantities of ceramic vessels suggest that feasting and drinking rituals may have taken place at the site in Early Minoan II. Petrographic analysis indicates that some of the pottery was not produced locally, but may have come from the western Isthmus of Ierapetra, demonstrating that the Prepalatial inhabitants of Vronda participated in a wide network of exchange with other sites in eastern Crete. Far less diagnostic material that could be assigned to the Early Minoan III–Middle Minoan IA period was recovered; this may indicate a major change in the size and nature of the settlement, perhaps related to a restructuring of settlements and a disbursement of population to smaller sites in the area.
- The earliest preserved architectural remains date to the Protopalatial period (Middle Minoan IB–Middle Minoan IIB), when a substantial building (Building P) was constructed on the eastern side of the summit; a Minoan kernos (or cupule stone - a flat slab with multiple small, round depressions arranged in a circular or oval pattern) found in a partially paved courtyard nearby to the south may date from the same era. Ceramic remains associated with Building P suggest elite feasting and drinking activities, while a clay nodulus (a token made from a small lump of clay with a decorative impression on one side) implies some type of administrative function. Evidence for other Protopalatial structures consists of a fragmentary wall on the eastern slope and several deposits of pottery used in later fills on the summit, the southeast slope, and the west slope.
- Evidence for occupation during the Neopalatial period (Middle Minoan III–Late Minoan I) consists of only a few walls and a pit on the summit, and substantial deposits of Neopalatial pottery used in later leveling fills. The site apparently went out of use at the end of the Neopalatial period (Late Minoan IB); most of the architecture may have been dismantled or destroyed when the site was re-inhabited in the Late Minoan IIIC period.
- In the Late Minoan IIIC period, the site was occupied by a small settlement covering an area of at least 0.50 hectares. Established only slightly later in time than either the Late Minoan IIIC habitation at nearby Kavousi Kastro or the much larger settlement at Karphi above the Lasithi Plateau, the Vronda settlement eventually consisted of about 20 houses, a large building on the summit that may have been the home of the community leader and a place for ritual feasting and drinking ceremonies (Building A-B), a freestanding temple or shrine of the "Goddess with Upraised Arms" (Greek: θεά μεθ’ υψωμένων χειρών) (Building G), and a kiln. The settlement may have been used for four generations (or around 120 years) before it was abandoned at the very end of the Late Minoan IIIC period. Although it is unknown why the inhabitants left or where they went, it is likely that at least some of them moved up to the higher settlement at Kavousi Kastro, which seems to have become the dominant site in the Kavousi region from the 11th through the 8th centuries BCE.
- The abandoned settlement was subsequently used as a burial ground, possibly by the descendants of the original villagers in an attempt to maintain group identity or legitimize territorial claims based on ancestry. During the Subminoan (11th century BCE), Protogeometric (10th century BCE), and early Geometric periods (9th century BCE), inhumation burials were placed in small, stone-built, corbelled tholos tombs, generally located at the northern and northwestern edges of the former settlement. Eleven tholos tombs (designated Vronda I–XI) are known, but only two (Vronda IV and IX) were found unrobbed. In the Late Geometric (8th century BCE) and Orientalizing (7th century BCE) periods, cremation burials were placed in stone-built enclosures (cist graves), often within the rooms of the long-abandoned and partially collapsed houses of the Late Minoan IIIC settlement. Approximately 30 cist graves were discovered by the Kavousi Project. Evidence suggests that the cremations took place on a pyre built within each enclosure and the cremated remains were left in situ. Since the graves were used on multiple occasions for men, women, and children (including infants and fetuses), they most likely represent family burial spaces. The cemetery at Vronda went out of use completely in the Late Orientalizing period.
- The site seems to have been largely uninhabited from the late 7th century BCE until the Venetian period (13th–17th century CE), when small buildings were constructed on the summit (Building R) and southern slope (Building F). From the same period is a partially excavated building ("Xerambela farmstead") with associated alonia (circular threshing floors) some 200 meters to the north of the Vronda summit. Later periods are represented only by few ceramic remains or miscellaneous artifacts.

== Archaeological research ==
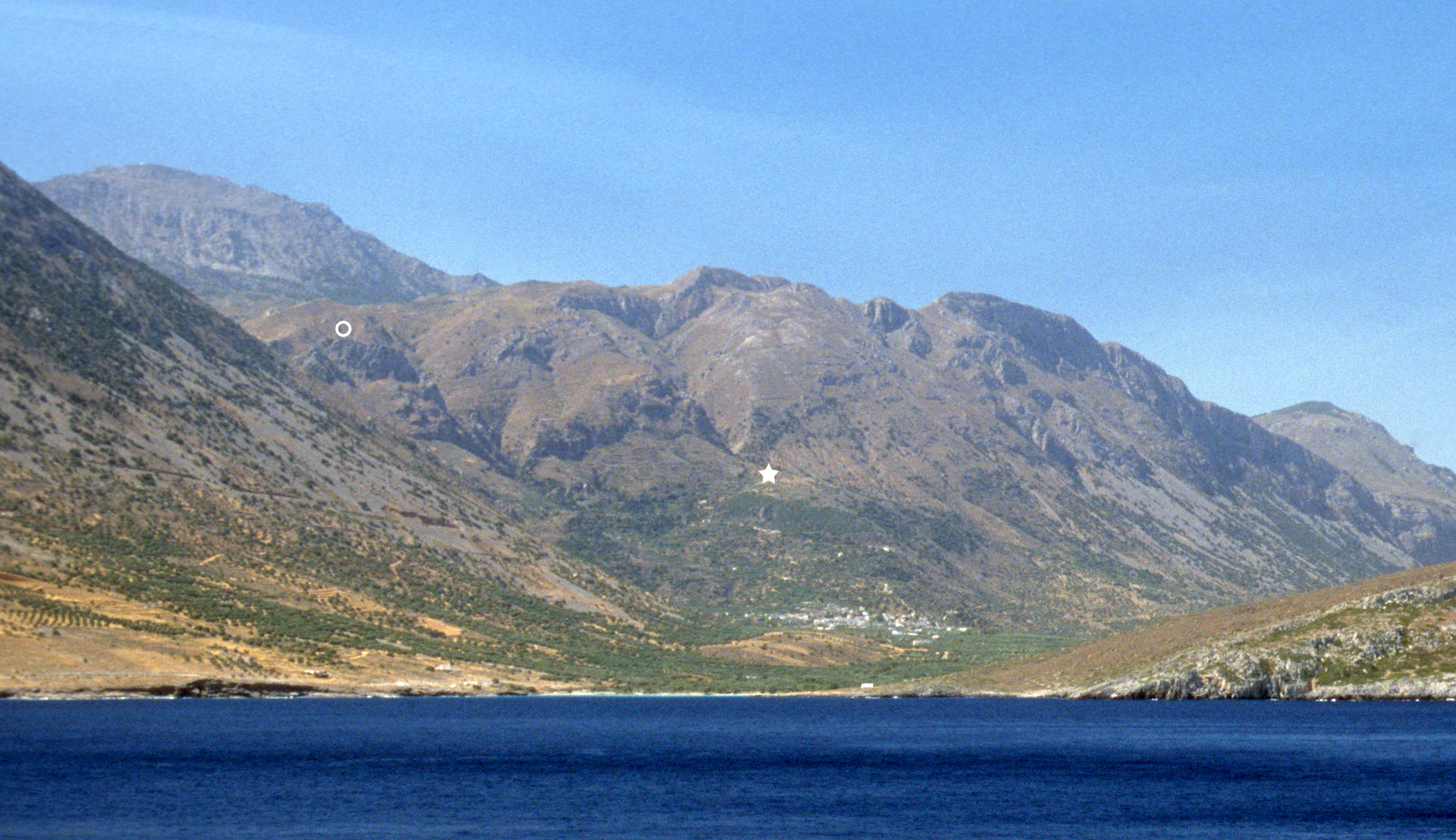
The Kavousi area as seen from the harbor of the Minoan settlement on Pseira island (from north). The location of Kavousi Vronda is indicated by a star; the location of Kavousi Kastro is indicated by a circle (2000).

The site was initially explored by the American archaeologist Harriet Boyd [Hawes] in 1900, "as representative of the American School of Classical Studies at Athens to excavate in the name of the Cretan Government." Boyd uncovered a large "house" with storerooms (now designated Building A-B) on the summit, an "excellent stretch of wall" (now called the East Terrace Wall), and eight small tholos tombs (now labeled Vronda I–VIII) on the north and northwest sides of the ridges. Another tholos tomb (now designated Vronda IX) was discovered in 1951 by a local landowner, George Sekadakis, who deposited the antiquities with the local authorities. Archaeological investigations were resumed in 1974 by Geraldine C. Gesell (University of Tennessee) and Leslie Preston Day (College of Wooster; later, Wabash College), who visited Vronda as part of an informal survey of sites in the area. In 1978, Gesell and Day were joined by William D.E. Coulson (University of Minnesota; later, American School of Classical Studies at Athens) to establish the Kavousi Project, which began with mapping of the site, a study of material found by Boyd and Sekadakis and housed in the Herakleion Archaeological Museum and the Archaeological Collection of Ierapetra (1979), cleaning of the tholos tombs (1981), a topographical plan, cleaning and drawing of architectural remains on the Vronda ridge (1983–1984), and two study seasons (1985–1986). Full-scale excavations under the auspices of the American School of Classical Studies at Athens and the 24th Ephorate of Prehistoric and Classical Antiquities of the Greek Archaeological Service, and with permission from the Greek Ministry of Culture, were conducted from 1987 to 1990 and in 1992, followed by site conservation from 1993 to 1996, and study from 1990 to 2003. Today, select antiquities discovered by the Kavousi Project at Vronda are on display in the Archaeological Museum of Agios Nikolaos and in the Archaeological Collection of Ierapetra. Other artifacts, excavation notebooks, and original drawings and plans, are housed in the Institute for Aegean Prehistory Study Center for East Crete (INSTAP-SCEC) in Pacheia Ammos in eastern Crete, Greece.

== Bibliography ==
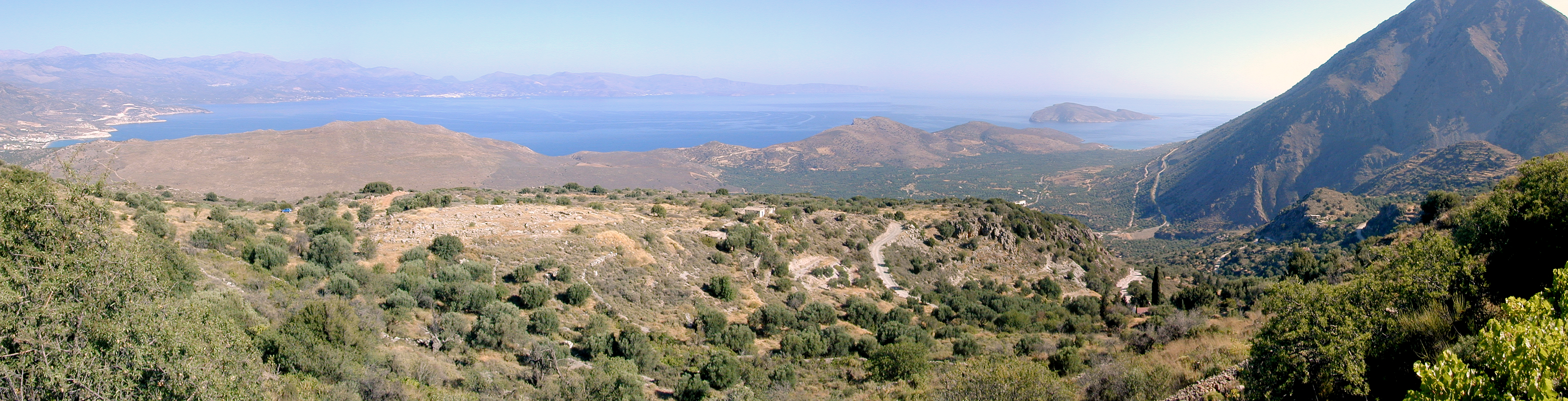
Panoramic view of the Vronda ridge, the Kavousi valley, and the Gulf of Mirabello from the southeast (2001).

- Boyd, Harriet A. (1901), 'Excavations at Kavousi, Crete, in 1900', American Journal of Archaeology, Vol. 5, No. 2. (Apr. - Jun., 1901), pp. 125-157.
- Day, Leslie P. (2011), "Appropriating the Past: Early Iron Age Mortuary Practices at Kavousi, Crete," in The ‘Dark Ages’ Revisited: Proceedings of the International Conference in Memory of William D.E. Coulson at the University of Thessaly, Volos, Greece, June 14–17, 2007, edited by A. Mazarakis Ainian, pp. 745–757. Volos, Greece: University of Thessaly Press. ISBN 9789609439053.
- Day, Leslie P., William D.E. Coulson, and Geraldine C. Gesell (1986), 'Kavousi 1983-84: The Settlement at Vronda', Hesperia Vol. 55, No. 4 (Oct. 1986), pp. 335-387
- Day, Leslie P., Heidi Dierckx, Kimberly Flint-Hamilton, Geraldine C. Gesell, Kevin T. Glowacki, Nancy L. Klein, David S. Reese, and Lynn M. Snyder (2016), Kavousi IIC: The LM IIIC Settlement at Vronda. The Specialist Reports (Prehistory Monographs 52). Philadelphia, PA: INSTAP Academic Press, 2016. ISBN 9781931534840.
- Day, Leslie P., and Kevin T. Glowacki (2012), Kavousi IIB: The Late Minoan IIIC Settlement at Vronda. The Buildings on the Periphery (Prehistory Monographs 39), Philadelphia, PA: INSTAP Academic Press, 2012.
- Day, Leslie P., Nancy L. Klein, and Lee Ann Turner (2009), Kavousi IIA: The Late Minoan IIIC Settlement at Vronda. The Houses on the Summit (Prehistory Monographs 26), Philadelphia, PA: INSTAP Academic Press, 2009.
- Day, L.P., and M.A. Liston. (2023), Kavousi IV: The Cemetery at Vronda (Prehistory Monographs 71). Philadelphia: INSTAP Academic Press. ISBN 9781931534369.
- Day, Leslie P., and Lynn M. Snyder (2004), "The ‘Big House’ at Vronda and the ‘Great House’ at Karphi: Evidence for Social Structure in LM IIIC Crete," in Crete Beyond the Palaces. Proceedings of the Crete 2000 Conference (Prehistory Monographs 10), edited by Leslie P. Day, Margaret S. Mook, and James P. Muhly, pp. 63–80. Philadelphia, PA: INSTAP Academic Press. ISBN 1931534098.
- Day, Peter M., Louise Joyner, Vassilis Kilikoglou, and Geraldine C. Gesell (2006), 'Goddesses, Snake Tubes, and Plaques: Analysis of Ceramic Ritual Objects from the LM IIIC Shrine at Kavousi,' Hesperia, Vol. 75, No. 2 (Apr. - Jun., 2006), pp. 137-175.
- Gaignerot-Driessen, Florence. (2016), De l'occupation postpalatiale à la cité-état grecque: le cas du Mirambello (Crète) (Aegaeum 40). Leuven-Liège, 2016.
- Gesell, Geraldine C. (1999), "Ritual Kalathoi in the Shrine at Kavousi," in MELETEMATA: Studies in Aegean Archaeology Presented to Malcolm H. Wiener as He Enters His 65th Year I–III (Aegaeum 20), edited by P.P Betancourt, V. Karageorghis, R. Laffineur, and W-D Niemeier, pp. 283–287. Liège and Austin, 1999
- Gesell, Geraldine.C. (2004), "From Knossos to Kavousi: The Popularizing of the Minoan Palace Goddess," in ΧΑΡΙΣ: Essays in Honor of Sara A. Immerwahr (Hesperia Suppl. 33), edited by Anne P. Chapin, pp. 131–150. Princeton, PA: American School of Classical Studies at Athens.
- Gesell, Geraldine C. (2012) "The Kavousi Goddesses with Up-raised Hands: New Information on Technology," in PHILISTOR: Studies in Honor of Costis Davaras (Prehistory Monographs 36), edited by E. Mantzourani and P. Betancourt, pp. 43–49. Philadelphia, PA: INSTAP Academic Press, 2012.
- Gesell, Geraldine C., William D.E. Coulson, and Leslie P. Day (1991), 'Excavations at Kavousi, Crete, 1988', Hesperia Vol. 60, No. 2 (Apr. 1991), pp. 145-177.
- Gesell, Geraldine C., Leslie P. Day, and William D.E. Coulson (1983), 'Excavations and Survey at Kavousi, 1978-1981', Hesperia Vol. 52, No. 4 (Oct. 1983), pp. 389-420.
- Gesell, Geraldine C., Leslie P. Day, and William D.E. Coulson (1988), 'Excavations at Kavousi, Crete, 1987', Hesperia Vol. 57, No. 4 (Oct. 1988), pp. 279-301.
- Gesell, Geraldine C., Leslie P. Day, and William D.E. Coulson (1995), 'Excavations at Kavousi, Crete, 1989 and 1990', Hesperia Vol. 64, No. 1 (Jan. 1995), pp. 67-120.
- Glowacki, Kevin T. (2004), "Household Analysis in Dark Age Crete," in Crete Beyond the Palaces. Proceedings of the Crete 2000 Conference (Prehistory Monographs 10), edited by Leslie P. Day, Margaret S. Mook, and James P. Muhly, pp. 125–136. Philadelphia, PA: INSTAP Academic Press. ISBN 1931534098.
- Glowacki, Kevin T. (2007) "House, Household, and Community at LM IIIC Vronda," in Building Communities: House, Settlement and Society in the Aegean and Beyond (British School at Athens Studies 15), edited by R. Westgate, N. Fisher, and J. Whitley, pp. 129-139. London: British School at Athens. ISBN 9780904887563.
- Glowacki, Kevin T., and Nancy L. Klein (2011), "Analysis of Domestic Architecture in Dark Age Crete: The LM IIIC Settlement at Vronda, Kavousi," in The ‘Dark Ages’ Revisited: Proceedings of the International Conference in Memory of William D.E. Coulson at the University of Thessaly, Volos, Greece, June 14–17, 2007, edited by A. Mazarakis Ainian, pp. 451–462. Volos, Greece: University of Thessaly Press. ISBN 9789609439053.
- Haggis, Donald C. (2005), Kavousi I: The Archaeological Survey of the Kavousi Region (Prehistory Monographs 16), Philadelphia, PA: INSTAP Academic Press, 2005.
- Klein, Nancy L. (2004), "The Architecture of the Late Minoan IIIC Shrine (Building G) at Vronda, Kavousi," in Crete Beyond the Palaces. Proceedings of the Crete 2000 Conference (Prehistory Monographs 10), edited by Leslie P. Day, Margaret S. Mook, and James P. Muhly, pp. 91–101. Philadelphia, PA: INSTAP ACADEMIC PRESS. ISBN 1931534098.
- Klein, N.L., and K.T. Glowacki. (2023). “Vernacular Architecture in Late Bronze/Early Iron Age Crete: A Case Study from Kavousi Vronda,” in Vernacular Architecture as a Frame of Life in Historic and Ancient Communities (Sonderschriften des Deutschen Archäologischen Instituts Kairo [SDAIK] 43), edited by B. Schäfer, H. Schlimme, and F. Keshk, pp. 47–59. Berlin: Deutsches Archäologisches Institut Kairo. https://doi.org/10.34780/fq66-s5ec.
- Liston, Maria A. (2007), ‘Secondary Cremation Burials at Kavousi Vronda, Crete: Symbolic Representation in Mortuary Practice,’ Hesperia, Vol. 76, No. 1 (Jan. - Mar., 2007), pp. 57-71.
- McEnroe, John C. (2010), Architecture of Minoan Crete. Constructing Identity in the Aegean Bronze Age, Austin, TX: University of Texas Press, 2010. ISBN 9780292721937.
- Morris, Michael W. (2002), Soil Science and Archaeology: Three Test Cases from Minoan Crete (Prehistory Monographs 4), Philadelphia, PA: INSTAP Academic Press, 2002.
- Wallace, Saro (2010), Ancient Crete: From Successful Collapse to Democracy's Alternative, Twelfth to Fifth Centuries BC, Cambridge: Cambridge University Press, 2010. ISBN 9780521112048.
