= Kavousi =

Kavousi Καβούσι
- Community

- Location within Greece
- Coordinates: 35°7′19″N 25°51′29″E
- Country: Greece
- Administrative region: Crete
- Regional unit: Lasithi
- Municipality: Ierapetra
- Municipal unit: Ierapetra
- Elevation: 125 m (410 ft)

Population (2021)
  - Community: 539
- Time zone: UTC+2 (EET)
  - Summer (DST): UTC+3 (EEST)
- Postal code: 72200
- Area code: 28420
- Vehicle registration: ΑΝ

Kavousi is a historic village in the municipality of Ierapetra in the regional unit of Lasithi in eastern Crete. "Kavousi" in the Cretan dialect means "water source" (Greek: Πηγή). The village is situated 19 km (11.8 mi) northeast of Ierapetra, 26 km (16 mi) east of Agios Nikolaos and 42 km (26 mi) west of Sitia. The village is located in the northern foothills of the Thripti mountain range at an elevation of 140 m (460 ft) above sea level. Many archaeological sites have been discovered in the area of Kavousi, among which are Vronda, Kastro, Azoria, Chrysokamino, and the island of Pseira. Kavousi lies 3.6 km (2.2 mi) south of Tholos Beach. The village has views of Mirabello Bay and the Isthmus of Ierapetra.

== Population history ==
Historical population
Year	Pop.	±%
2001	611	—
2011	563	−7.9%
2021	539	−4.3%
