= Harriet Boyd Hawes =

American archaeologist

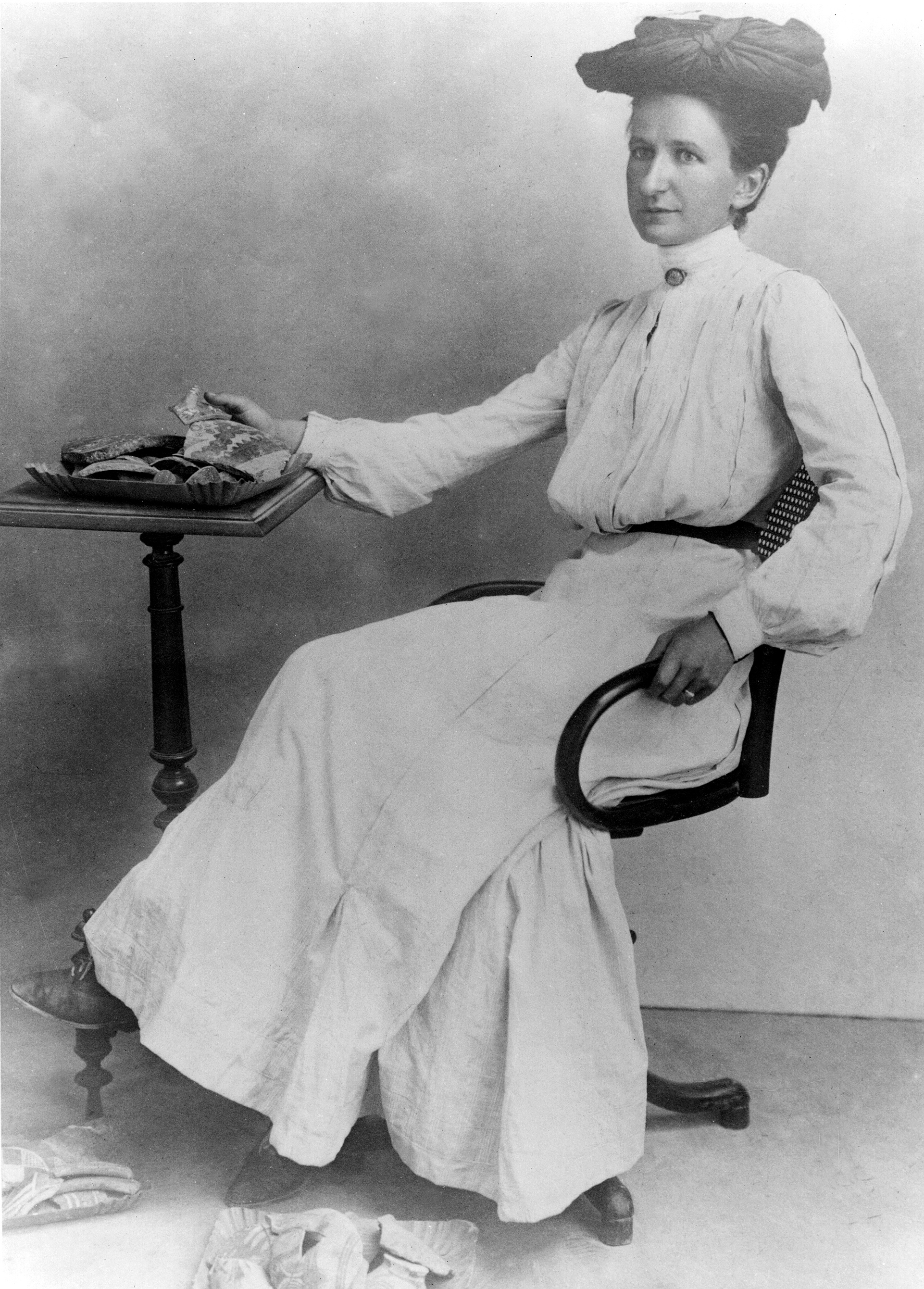
- Harriet Boyd sorting sherds at Heraklion, c. 1904 (Smith College Archives)
- Born: Harriet Ann Boyd Hawes; October 11, 1871; Boston, Massachusetts
- Died: March 31, 1945 (aged 73); Washington, D.C.
- Education: Smith College
- Occupation: Archaeologist at Wellesley College
- Spouse: Charles Henry Hawes (m. 1906)
- Children: 2

Harriet Ann Boyd Hawes (October 11, 1871 – March 31, 1945) was a pioneering American archaeologist, nurse, relief worker, and professor. She is best known as the discoverer and first director of Gournia, one of the first archaeological excavations to uncover a Minoan settlement and palace on the Aegean island of Crete. She was also the second person to have the honor of the Agnes Hoppin Memorial Fellowship bestowed upon her, and the very first female archeologist to speak at the Archaeological Institute of America.

== Early life and education ==
Harriet Ann Boyd was born in Boston, Massachusetts. Her mother died when she was a child, and so Harriet was raised by her father alongside her four older brothers. She was first introduced to the study of Classics by her brother, Alex. After attending the Prospect Hill School in Greenfield, she went on to graduate from Smith College in Northampton, Massachusetts in 1892 with a degree in Classics (specializing in Greek).

== Early career ==
Map of Minoan sites on Crete.

After working as a teacher for four years at academic institutions in the states of North Carolina and Delaware, she followed her passion for Greece and its ancient culture, pursuing further studies in Classics at the American School of Classical Studies in Athens, Greece. She had originally intended on pursuing studies in England but she decided to go Greece based both on the brother of the archaeologist, Louis Dyer, and having heard Amelia Edwards speak while a student at Smith. During her stay in Greece she also served as a volunteer nurse in Thessaly during the Greco-Turkish War. She asked her professors to be allowed to participate in the school's archaeological fieldwork, but instead was encouraged to become an academic librarian.

Hawes was the second person to be awarded the Agnes Hoppin Memorial Fellowship, in 1899. Frustrated by lack of support for her desire to be an active archaeological excavator, she took the remainder of her fellowship and went on her own in search of archaeological remains on the island of Crete, in particular around Gournia on the northeastern coast of the island. She made this decision even though the area was only just emerging from the Greco-Turkish War and therefore was far from safe. Her ability to speak fluent Greek, and her record of service with the Red Cross during the Greco-Turkish War a short while earlier, earned her a degree of goodwill from the local people that proved critical to the success of her work. In Crete, she visited the excavation of Knossos led by British archaeologist Arthur Evans, who suggested she explore the region of Kavousi. Hawes soon became well known for her expertise in the field of archaeology, and for four months in the spring of 1900 she led an excavation at Kavousi, during which she discovered settlements and cemeteries of Late Minoan IIIC, Early Iron Age, and Early Archaic date (1200-600 BC) at the sites of Vronda and Kastro. During that same campaign she dug a test trench at the site of Azoria, the most important Ancient Greek (i.e. post-Minoan) site in the region, evidently an early city (c. 700-500 BC). Azoria is now under renewed excavation as part of a major five-year project.

== Later academic career ==
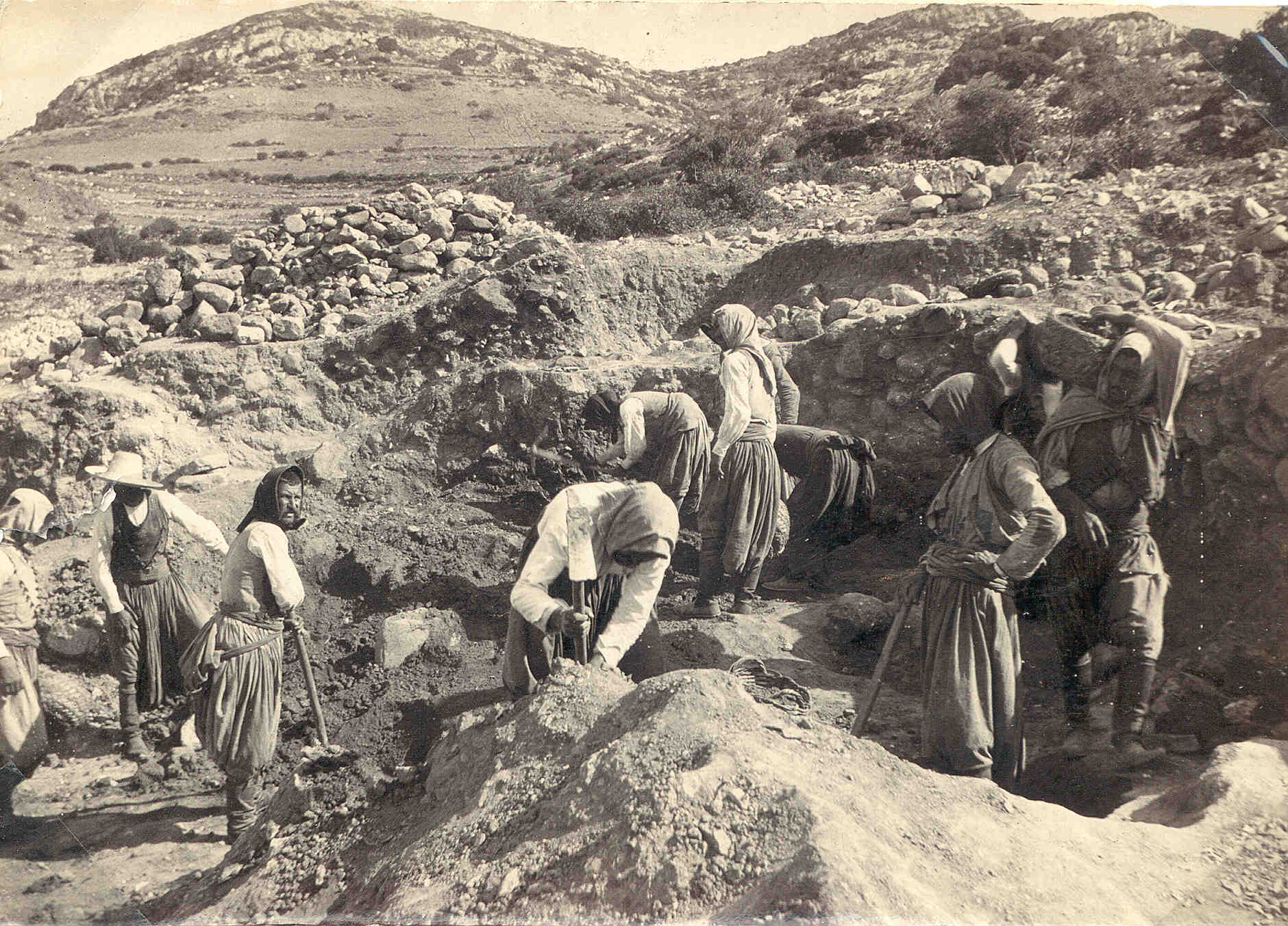
Boyd's excavations at Gournia, 1901–1904 (Smith College Archives)

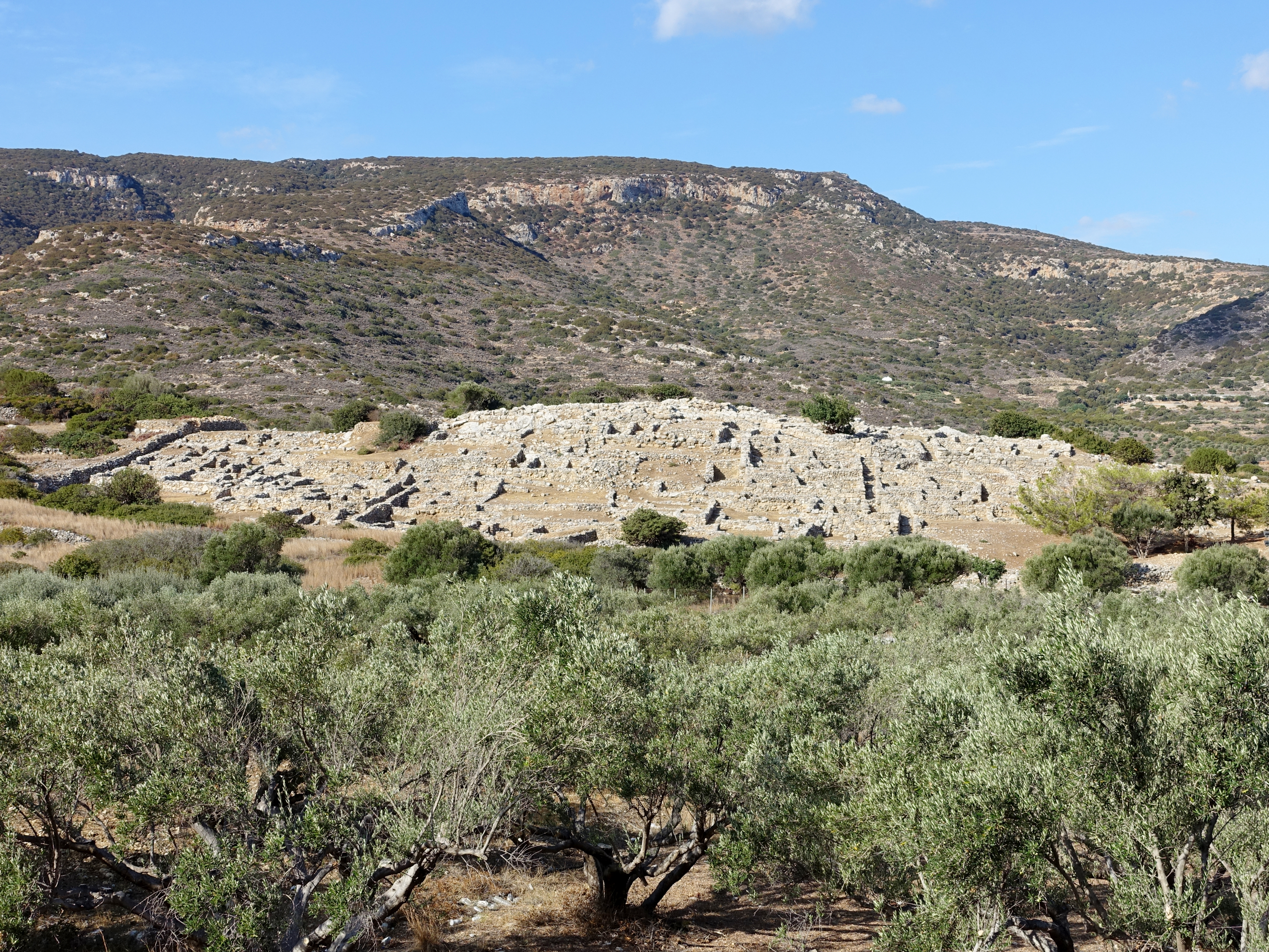
View of the Gournia excavation site in 2016

Later the same year, Hawes returned to the United States. She accepted a position at Smith College teaching Greek Archaeology, epigraphy, and modern Greek in late 1900, and subsequently received her M.A. from Smith in 1901. She taught at Smith until 1905, interspersing her time there with frequent trips abroad for archaeological excursions.

Between 1901 and 1904, while on a leave of absence from Smith College, Harriet Boyd Hawes returned to Crete, where she discovered and excavated the Ancient Minoan settlement at Gournia on the northeastern coast of the island. Hawes was the first woman to direct a major field project in Greece, her crew consisting of over 100 workers and she was the first archaeologist to discover and completely excavate an Early Bronze Age Minoan town site. The material excavated from the site of Gournia was divided between the Heraklion Archaeological Museum in Crete and the University of Pennsylvania Museum of Archaeology and Anthropology, which supported her excavations. She was assisted by Edith Hall Dohan, her classmate from Smith College. In 1902, she described her discovery during a lecture tour of the United States and was the first woman to speak before the Archaeological Institute of America. The report of her findings, titled Gournia, Vasiliki and Other Prehistoric Sites on the Isthmus of Hierapetra, was published in 1908 by the American Exploration Society. She excavated many more Bronze and Iron Age settlements in the Aegean Sea region of the world and became a recognized authority on the area. In 1910, Smith College bestowed on her an honorary doctorate in the field of Humane Letters. Between 1920 and her retirement in 1936, she lectured at Wellesley College in Massachusetts, a historically women's college, on pre-Christian art.

== War nursing ==
Boyd Hawes became involved in wartime nursing efforts after her graduation from Smith College. She cared for injured and dying soldiers in the Greco-Turkish War (1897), Spanish–American War (1898), and World War I. Her work during World War I included bringing supplies to Corfu for wounded soldiers in the Serbian Army (1915), helping the wounded in France (1916), and founding the Smith College Relief Unit in France (1917). Boyd Hawes was director of the latter for three years, during which time she also worked as a nurse's aide at the YMCA. After her return home, Boyd Hawes continued her support for the war effort by giving fund-raising lectures on behalf of the Smith College Relief Unit.

== Personal life ==
During one trip to Crete, she met Charles Henry Hawes, an English anthropologist and archaeologist who later became the associate-director of the Boston Museum of Fine Arts. They were married on March 3, 1906, and nine months later their son, Alexander Boyd Hawes, was born. When their daughter Mary Nesbit Hawes followed in August 1910, Charles was teaching at Dartmouth College and the family was living in Hanover, New Hampshire. In 1920, the family moved to Cambridge, Massachusetts and Harriet joined the faculty at Wellesley College. Hawes always remained committed to her academic and archaeological work as well as to her family.

== Later life and legacy ==
When Charles retired in 1936, the couple moved to Washington, D.C., where Harriet remained after her husband died. She died there on March 31, 1945, aged 73.

Her childhood home in Chester Square is featured on the Boston Women's Heritage Trail.

In 1992, her daughter, Mary Allsebrook, published Born to Rebel: the Life of Harriet Boyd Hawes. The book was edited by Annie Allsebrook, Harriet Boyd Hawes' granddaughter.

== Works ==
- Boyd, H.A. 1901. "Excavations at Kavousi, Crete, in 1900", American Journal of Archaeology 5, 125–157.
- Boyd, H.A. 1904. "Gournia. Report of the American Exploration Society's Excavations at Gournia, Crete, 1901-1903", in University of Pennsylvania: Transactions of the Department of Archaeology 1 (1904), 7–44.
- Gournia, Vasiliki and other prehistoric sites on the isthmus of Hierapetra, Crete; excavations of the Wells-Houston-Cramp expeditions, 1901, 1903, 1904. By Harriet Boyd Hawes, Blanche E. Williams, Richard B. Seager, Edith H. Hall. (Philadelphia, The American exploration society, Free museum of science and art 1908).
- Charles Henry Hawes and Harriet Boyd-Hawes, with a preface by Arthur J. Evans. Crete: The Forerunner of Greece (London, 1909).

== Works about her ==
Adams, Amanda (2010), Ladies of the Field: Early Women Archaeologists and Their Search for Adventure, Douglas & McIntyre, ISBN 978-1-55365-433-9

Allsebrook, Mary (2002), Born to Rebel. The Life of Harriet Boyd Hawes. Edited by Annie Allsebrook. First published in 1992, reprinted with corrections and a postscript, Oxbow Books, ISBN 1-84217-041-4
