= Pseira =

Island in Greece

Coordinates: 35°11′25″N 25°51′35″E

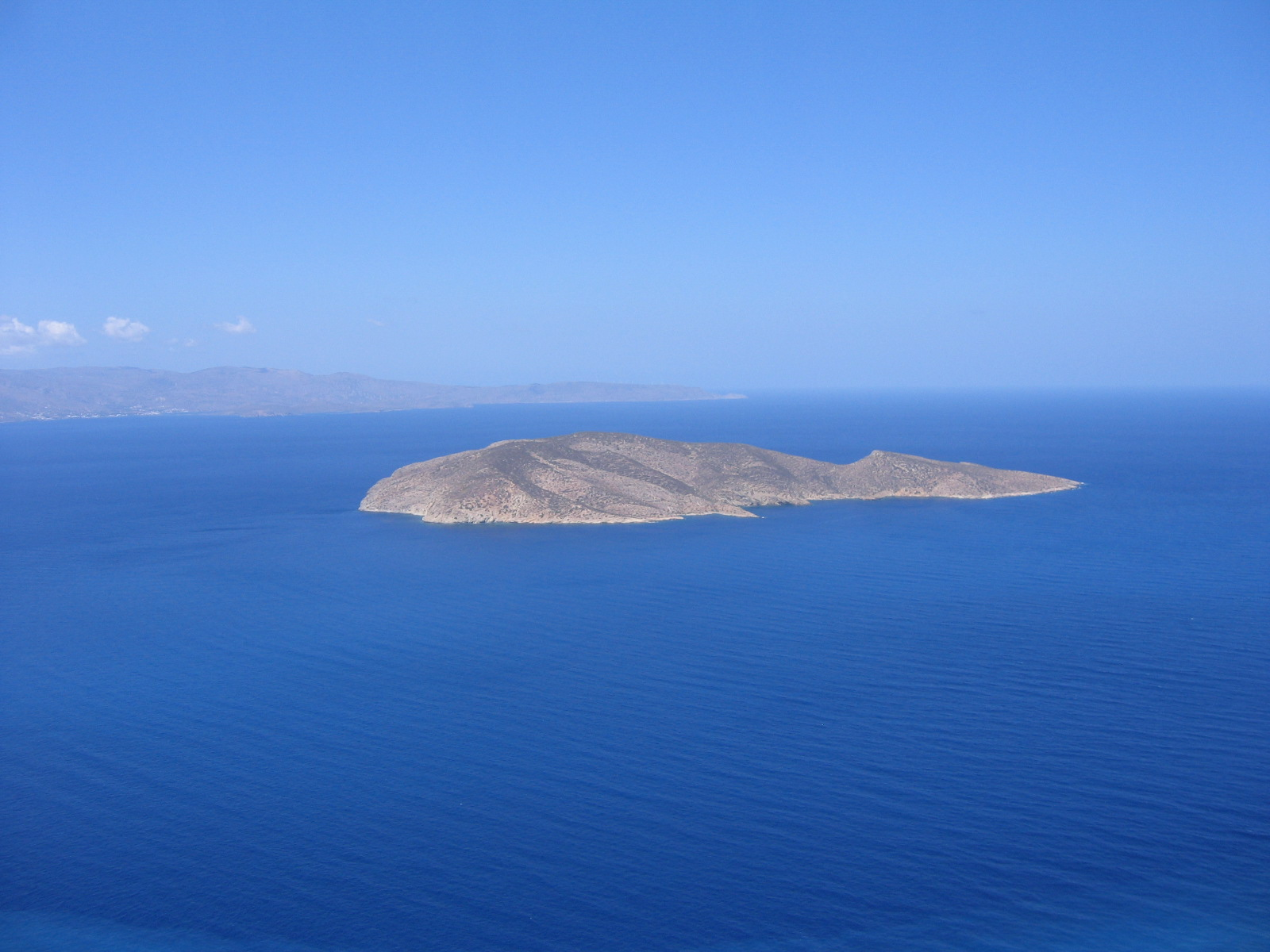
Pseira: View from the coast of Crete near Platanos

Pseira (Greek: Ψείρα) is an islet in the Gulf of Mirabello in northeastern Crete with the archaeological remains of Minoan and Mycenean civilisation.

== History ==
The island was explored in 1906–1907 by Richard Seager and partially documented by Halvor Bagge in ink and watercolors based on photographs (University Museum, University of Pennsylvania, 1910), and more minutely examined in 1984–1992 by Philip P. Betancourt and Costis Davaras, for Temple University. Archaeological materials in this seaport, sited above its harbor, to which it was connected by cliffside stairs, span the period from the end of the Neolithic in the 4th millennium to the Late Bronze Age, with the cultural high point being Early Minoan to Late Minoan IB. At that time the prosperous town of some 60 buildings was ranged round its open square (plateia), with a single large building that occupied one side. Like many contemporary Late Minoan IB sites, it was violently destroyed, c. 1550–1450 BC. A remnant of its population cleared spaces in the rubble and for a time continued to dwell in the ruined town.

=== Minoan civilisation ===
Minoan Crete: Pseira lies off the coast northeast of Gournia.

A Minoan seal-stone from the site representing a ship is a reminder that the harbour was essential. The Minoan community supported itself by fishing and subsistence agriculture: They deeply tilled and terraced agricultural sites where they manured the thin limy soil with human waste from the settlement. They did not enclose their planting sites, as the island's much later Byzantine practice was, a sign that goats did not roam free in Minoan Pseira; neither were pigs kept. Dams collected seasonal run-off, for water was scarce on the island, though the Aegean region was less dry in the second millennium BCE than now.

=== Minoan cemetery ===
Consistent with the long period of occupation, burials in the necropolis west of the town are of five kinds: Neolithic rock shelter burials; cist graves built of vertical slabs with Cycladic parallels; small rock-built tombs; jar burials; and tombs imitating houses. Artifacts from the necropolis included clay vases, stone vessels, obsidian, bronze tools and jewelry. Burials broke off in Middle Minoan, before the town underwent its Late Minoan expansion. The Late Minoan I building that occupies the northern side of the plateia, cautiously identified as a "civic shrine", featured painted stucco bas-reliefs in its upper floor and retains a fresco fragment of two women in Minoan dress of complicated woven design who face one another. Excavations at Pseira have been clouded by successive development in prehistoric stages obfuscating respective earlier stages, in contrast with more clearly defined strata in Knossos, for example.

=== House of the Rhyta ===
Excavation at the House of the Rhyta disclosed evidence for some Minoan cult practice that add to our understanding of some Minoan rites, though the core meaning they evoked escapes us. In three different structures cult activity involved the use of rhyta, drinking vessels in several forms, all with a hole at the base, a bull-shaped vessel, triton shells, and chalices, and a large number of cups. "Cult practices involving large numbers of rhyta continued into successive periods in the Late Bronze Age, as is demonstrated by an interesting religious structure at Ugarit (modern Ras Shamra, Syria) with 15 rhyta, including Mycenaean and Minoan examples," Betancourt observes. Chemical traces in a rhyton suggest barley, beer, and wine. All of these ritual vessels were stored in between their periodic seasonal use, when large groups would gather in upper-floor rooms that had lime-washed and painted stucco reliefs on the walls and a floor that was ritually whitewashed (in the building fronting the plateia) or paved with stone slabs (House of the Rhyta). In the House of the Rhyta, there was a kitchen space below, too substantial for the occupants of the building alone; it had a corner hearth, a mortar built into bedrock in the opposite corner, and grinding rocks. The drinking rites that were observed in the upper room were apparently accompanied by feasting.

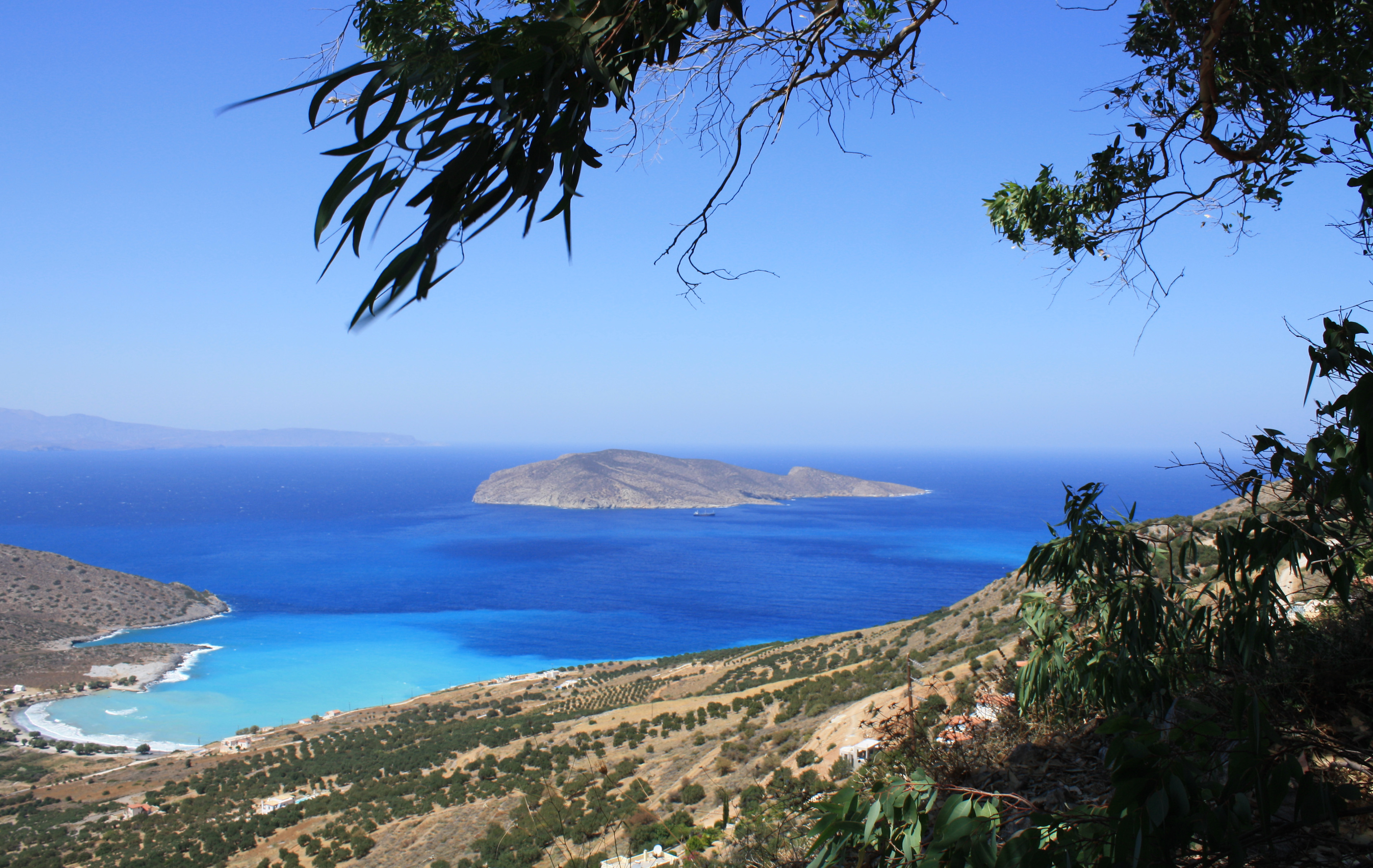
The island of Pseira from the coast near Platanos.

=== Hoard ===
A hoard found by Seager near the lower harbor included a rhyton in the shape of a basket decorated with double axes, pear-shaped rhyta decorated with dolphins, a bull-shaped vessel, and a jar decorated with ivy — which in a Greek context would indicate the presence of Dionysus — among other goods.

== Archaeological publications ==
The meticulous modern excavations by Betancourt and Davaras resulted in several highly specialized publications, all from INSTAP Academic Press:

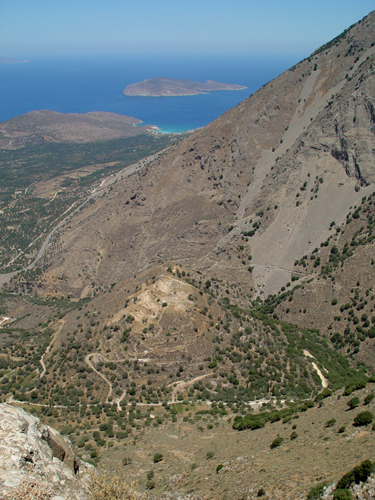
Pseira island, in the distance, can be seen from Kavousi Kastro, an archaeological site overlooking Azoria View from the south.

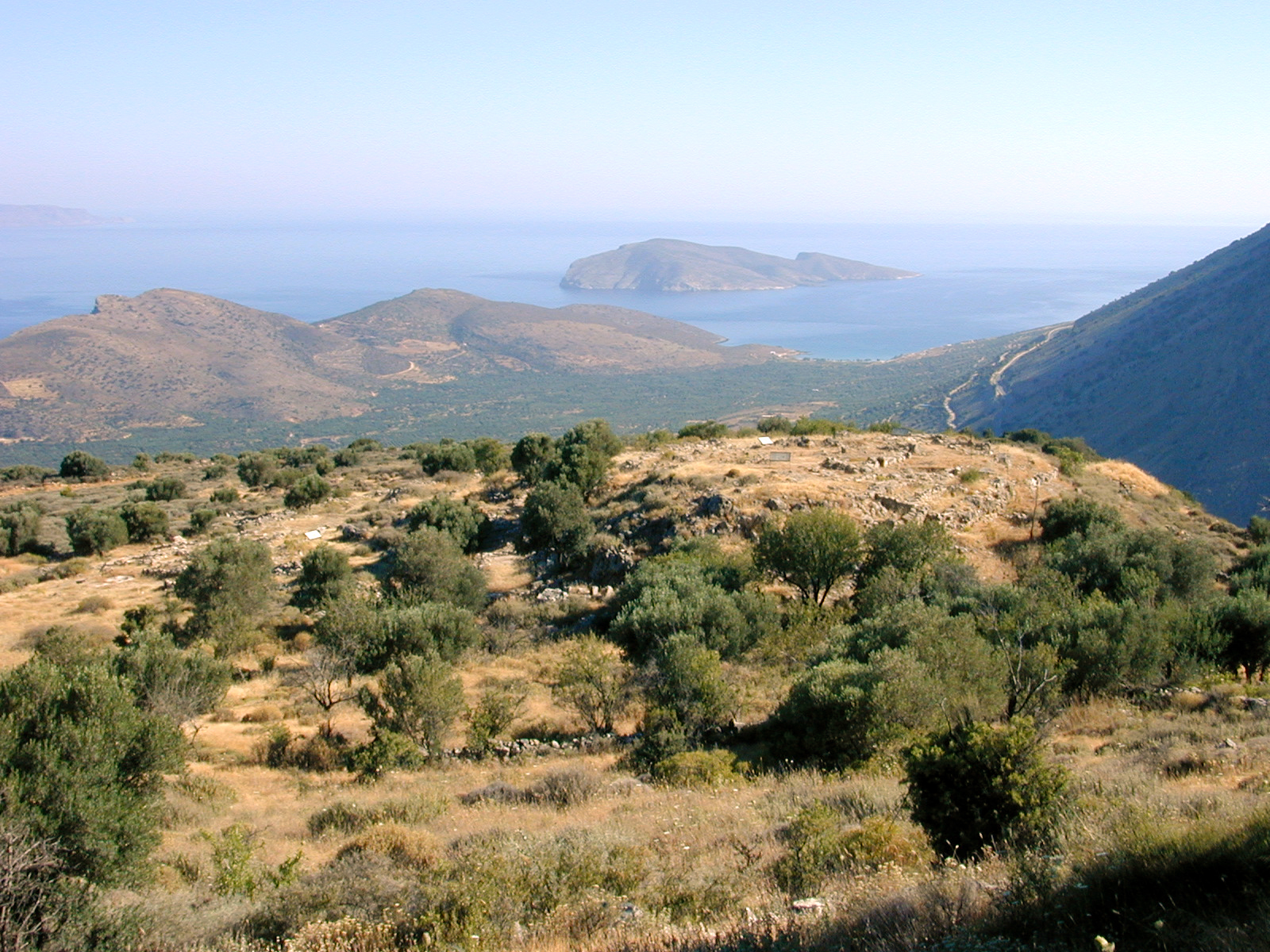
Pseira island, in the distance, with the archaeological site of Kavousi Vronda in the foreground. View from the south.

- Pseira: A Bronze Age Seaport in Minoan Crete Philip P. Betancourt
- Pseira I: The Minoan Buildings on the West Side of Area A, Philip P. Betancourt, ed.
- Pseira II: Building AC (the “Shrine”) and Other Buildings in Area A, Philip P. Betancourt and Costis Davaras, eds. 1997
- Pseira III: The Plateia Building, Cheryl R. Floyd 1998
- Pseira IV: Minoan Buildings in Areas B, C, D, and F, Philip P. Betancourt and Costis Davaras, eds. 1999
- Pseira V: Architecture of Pseira, John C. McEnroe
- Pseira VI: The Pseira Cemetery I: The Surface Survey, edited by Philip P. Betancourt and Costis Davaras 2003 Topography and methodology.
- Pseira VII: The Pseira Cemetery II: Excavation of the Tombs edited by Philip P. Betancourt and Costis Davaras 2003
- Pseira VIII: The Pseira Island Survey, Part 1 by Philip Betancourt, Costis Davaras and Richard Hope Simpson
- Pseira IX: The Pseira Island Survey, Part 2: The Intensive Surface Survey, edited by Philip Betancourt, Costis Davaras and Richard Hope Simpson
- Costis Davaras 2003. Führer zu den Altertümern Kretas, Athens, pp. 300–302.

An introductory CD-ROM for a broad public audience was also produced.

== See also ==
- List of islands of Greece
