= Mirabello Bay =

Bay in north-eastern Crete, Greece

Coordinates: 35.1747°N 25.7858°E

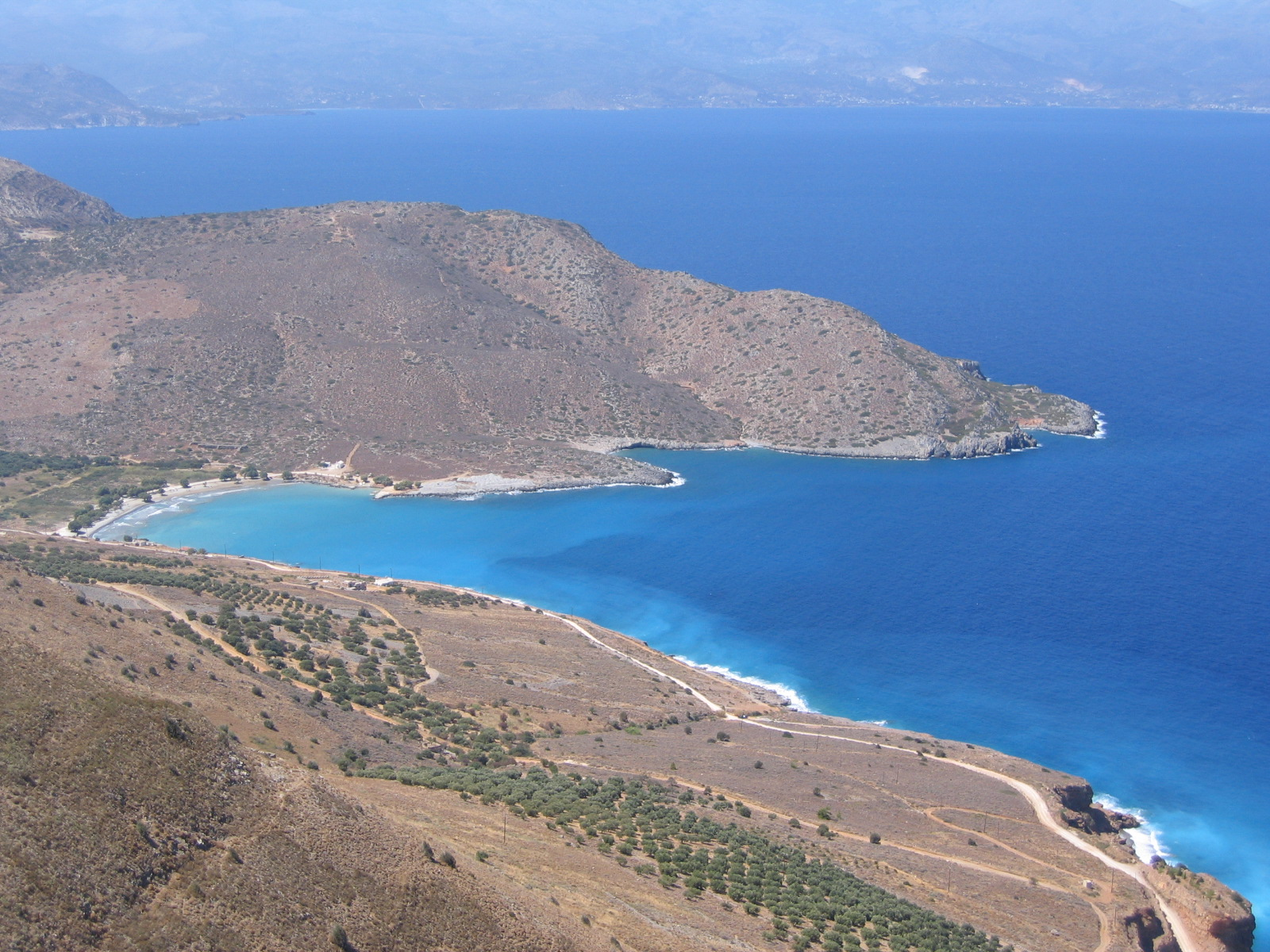
Mirabello Bay

Mirabello Bay (also Bay/Gulf of Mirabello/Mirabella) is an embayment of the Sea of Crete on the eastern part of Crete in present-day Greece. It is the largest bay of the Greek islands and the fifth largest in the Mediterranean Sea. The tourist town Agios Nikolaos overlooks the bay. This locale was important in prehistoric settlement of the island of Crete.

== History ==
The coast of the Bay of Mirabello was noted for its role in copper metallurgy development in the period circa 3000 BC. In the Late Minoan period, cities on high ground overlooking the Bay of Mirabello were founded as cities of refuge, including Karphi. Later in the Dorian Invasion, settlement occurred of other hilltop cities overlooking the Bay of Mirabello; an example of this phase of settlement was the city of Lato.

On 22 August 1936, a Short S.17 Kent of Imperial Airways, Scipio (G-ABFA), sank after a heavy landing in the bay with a strong downdraft. The plane had just arrived on a flight from Alexandria. 11 people (4 crew and 7 passengers) were on board; two of the passengers, Richard Wilson-Dickson of the 5th Battalion Royal Tank Corps and Thomas Forbes of the Late 16th Lancers and Indian Police, drowned in the wreckage; the rescue ship was delayed due to a communication problem.

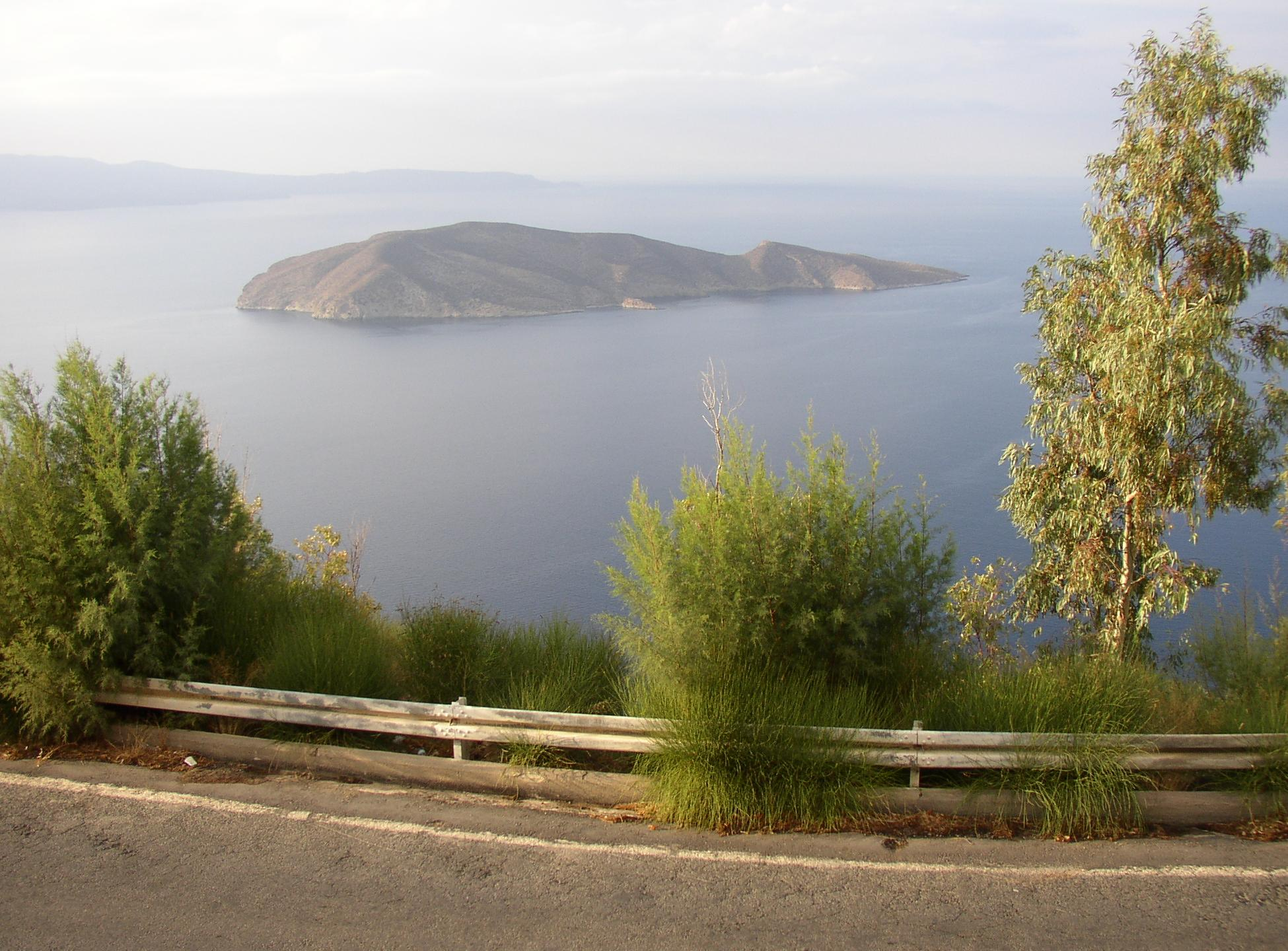
Island of Pseira in Mirabello Bay
