= Doreen Canaday Spitzer =

American archaeologist

- Born: December 5, 1914; New Castle, Indiana, U.S.
- Died: September 6, 2010 (aged 95)
- Education: Bryn Mawr College, American School of Classical Studies at Athens
- Occupation: Archaeologist
- Spouse: Lyman Spitzer (m. 1940)
- Children: 4, including Nicholas Spitzer

Doreen Damaris Spitzer (née Canaday; December 5, 1914 – September 6, 2010) was an American archaeologist.

== Early life ==
Spitzer was born in 1914 in New Castle, Indiana. She was the only child of Toledo industrialist and car manufacturer Ward Murphey Canaday and Mariam Canaday née Coffin. The family moved to Toledo, Ohio, when she was a toddler. She was educated at Dongan Hall boarding school, on Long Island, New York, which her mother also attended as a child. She learned to play the flute.

== Career ==
Spitzer first visited Greece in 1933 with her parents. She graduated from Bryn Mawr College in 1936, where she had majored in archaeology and was a student of historian Rhys Carpenter and archaeologist Mary Hamilton Swindler.

Spitzer moved to Greece in September 1936, despite her fathers worries about the political instability in the Balkan peninsula. She was enrolled as a student at the American School of Classical Studies at Athens. Whilst studying, she learned the Greek language, was part of the “Oxford Movement" and travelled with her fellow students to Egypt and Turkey, even swimming the Hellespont in Istanbul. Spitzer worked at the site of Ancient Corinth from the spring of 1937. She was forced to leave Greece at the end of 1938 due to the ongoing tensions in the lead up to World War II.

Back in America, she raised money alongside her mother for the Greek War Relief Association. In 1942 she published an article in Hesperia: The Journal of the American School of Classical Studies at Athens, regarding Roman relief bowls that had been excavated during her work at Corinth.

Spitzer, her husband and young family moved to Princeton, New Jersey, in 1948, when he was appointed Professor of Astronomy at Princeton University. While living there, she volunteered as a docent in the Princeton University Art Museum and instituted an annual celebration of Greek Independence Day which was held at her home. She invited Princeton's Greek-American community and classics scholars from the university to eat Greek food and dance Greek dances. She organized the annual Bryn Mawr Book sale to raise funds for her alma mater. Alongside her academic pursuits, she taught at her local Sunday School for eight years, and published a book for Sunday schools titled "Know Thyself": A Leader's Guide to the Study of Socrates, in 1954.

She was awarded an honorary Doctor of Humanities degree from the University of Toledo in 1987.

She died in 2010, when she was 95 years old.

== Legacy ==
Spitzer was a long time supporter of the American School of Classical Studies at Athens, serving as Trustee 1978–1996, President of the Board of Trustees 1983–1988, Trustee Emerita from 1996, and President of the Friends from 1988 until her death. With her parents, she was instrumental in the reconstruction of the Stoa of Attalos in the Agora. She also promoted the development of the school newsletter.

After the establishment of the archives at the American School in the 1980s, she donated personal documents to the archive. The "Doreen Canaday Spitzer Papers" collection includes over 1,000 images and documents from her "time in Greece from 1936-1938, some personal correspondence, and professional correspondence related to the American School." It was digitized in 2015–2016. Spitzer also donated a small collection of antiquities to Bryn Mawr College.

Spitzer was a supporter of the American Hellenic Educational Progressive Association (AHEPA).

== Personal life ==
Doreen married the astronomer Lyman Spitzer on June 29, 1940, and they had four children: Nicholas, Dionis, Sarah, and Lydia. In 1997, she published the book As Long as Ye Both Shall Live: A Marital Memoir, about their 57-year marriage. Among the Spitzer children is neurobiologist Nicholas Spitzer, a professor at the University of California, San Diego.
