= Charles Odell =

Charles Odell may refer to:

- Charles Odell (cricketer) (1830–1875), English-born cricketer in New Zealand
- Charles Henry Odell (1829–1897), American sailor, politician, and soldier

== See also ==
- Charles Robert O'Dell (born 1937), American astronomer
