= Lyman Spitzer =

American astronomer (1914–1997)

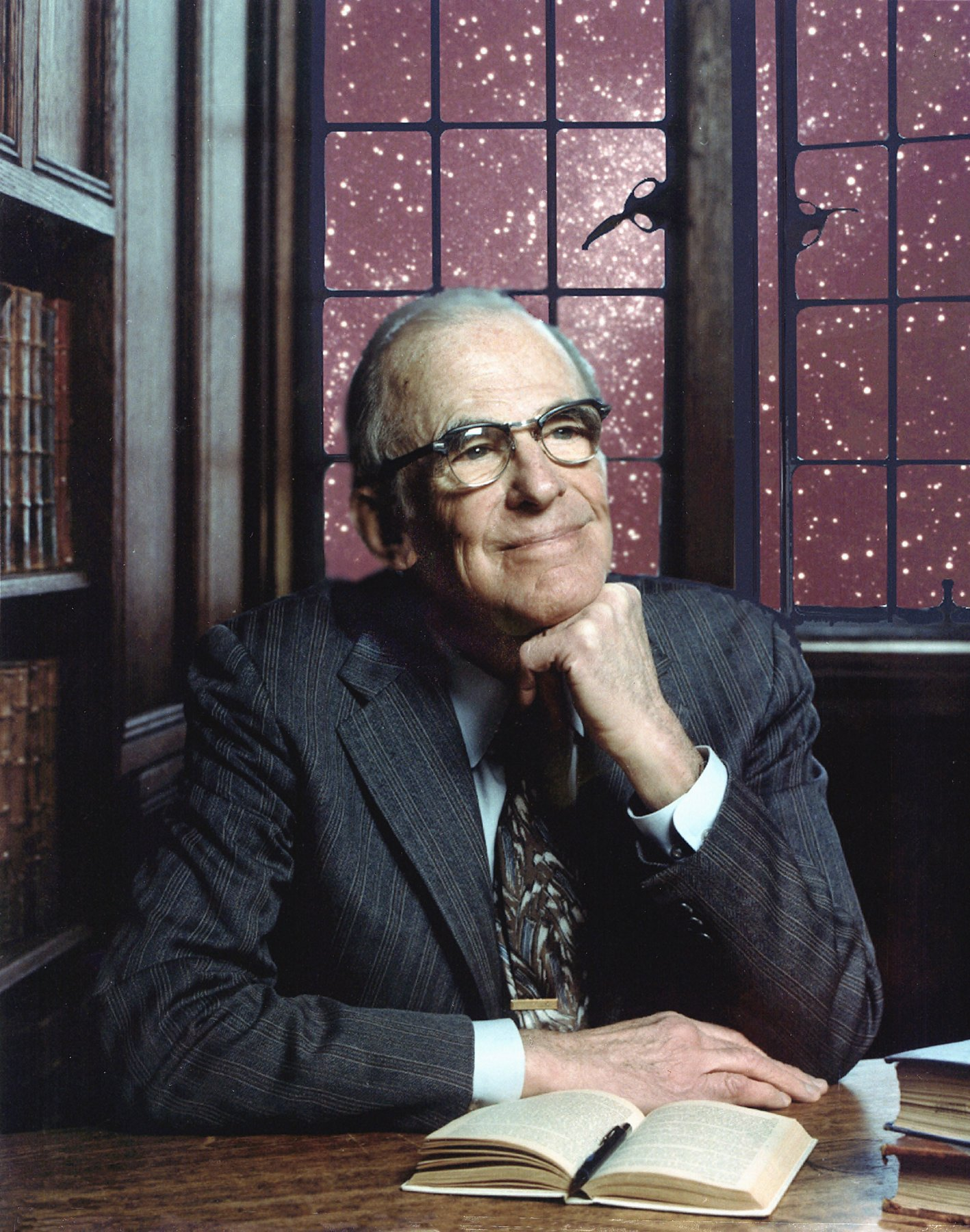
- Born: Lyman Spitzer Jr. June 26, 1914; Toledo, Ohio, U.S.
- Died: March 31, 1997 (aged 82); Princeton, New Jersey, U.S.
- Resting place: Princeton Cemetery
- Education: Princeton University (Ph.D.); Yale University (B.A.); Phillips Academy
- Known for: Research in star formation and plasma physics Promotion of space telescopes
- Spouse: Doreen Canaday (m. 1940)
- Awards: Henry Draper Medal (1974); James Clerk Maxwell Prize for Plasma Physics (1975); National Medal of Science (1979); Prix Jules Janssen; Crafoord Prize (1985)
- Scientific career
- Fields: Theoretical physics
- Doctoral advisor: Henry Norris Russell
- Doctoral students: John Richard Gott; Bruce Elmegreen; George B. Field; J. Beverley Oke; Trinh Xuan Thuan

Lyman Spitzer Jr. (June 26, 1914 – March 31, 1997) was an American theoretical physicist, astronomer and mountaineer. As a scientist, he carried out research into star formation and plasma physics and in 1946 conceived the idea of telescopes operating in outer space. Spitzer invented the stellarator plasma device and is the namesake of NASA's Spitzer Space Telescope. As a mountaineer, he made the first ascent of Mount Thor, with Donald C. Morton.

== Early life and education ==
Spitzer was born to a Presbyterian family in Toledo, Ohio, the son of Lyman Spitzer Sr. and Blanche Carey (née Brumback). Through his paternal grandmother, he was related to inventor Eli Whitney. Spitzer graduated from Scott High School. He then attended Phillips Academy from 1929 to 1931 and went on to Yale College, where he graduated Phi Beta Kappa in 1935 and was a member of Skull and Bones. During a year of study at St John's College, Cambridge, he was influenced by Arthur Eddington and the young Subrahmanyan Chandrasekhar. Returning to the U.S., Spitzer received his Ph.D. in physics from Princeton University in 1938 after completing a doctoral dissertation, titled "The spectra of late supergiant stars", under the direction of Henry Norris Russell.

== Mountaineering ==
In 1965, Spitzer and Donald Morton became the first to climb Mount Thor 1,675 m (5,495 ft), located in Auyuittuq National Park, on Baffin Island, Nunavut, Canada. As a member of the American Alpine Club, Spitzer established the "Lyman Spitzer Cutting Edge Climbing Award" (Now called the "Cutting Edge Grant") which gives $12,000 to several mountain climbing expeditions annually.

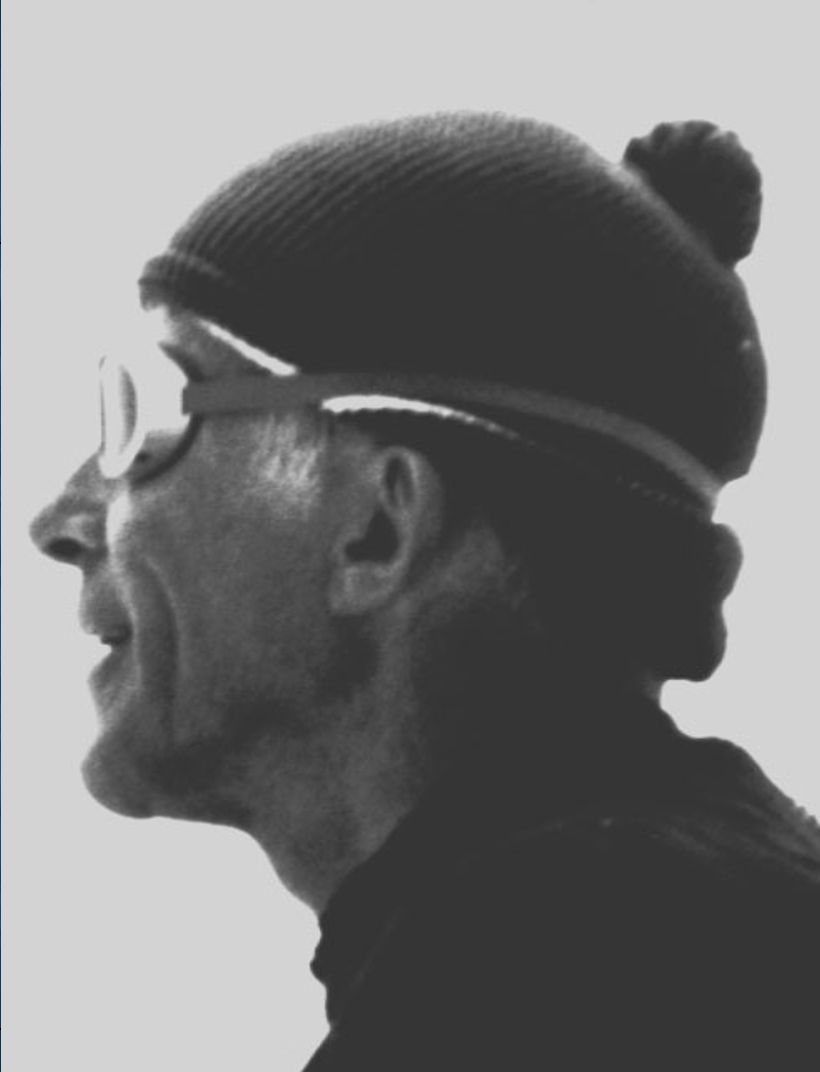
This image was made in July, 1967 on the Summit Ridge of Mt. Bertram Petrie in British Columbia, Canada by Charles Robert O'Dell during its first ascent.

== Science ==
Spitzer's brief time as a faculty member at Yale was interrupted by his wartime work on the development of sonar. In 1947, at the age of 33, he succeeded Russell as director of Princeton University Observatory, an institution that, virtually jointly with his contemporary and friend Martin Schwarzschild, he continued to head until 1979.

Spitzer's research centered on the interstellar medium, to which he brought a deep understanding of plasma physics. In the 1930s and 1940s, he was among the first to recognize star formation as an ongoing contemporary process. His monographs, "Diffuse Matter in Space" (1968) and "Physical Processes in the Interstellar Medium" (1978) consolidated decades of work, and themselves became the standard texts for some decades more.

In 1951, Spitzer invented the stellarator and proposed its development to the Atomic Energy Commission. The AEC accepted the proposal and this led to the creation of Project Matterhorn S in association with Princeton University. Spitzer was its founding director. In 1961 it was renamed as Princeton Plasma Physics Laboratory. Under his leadership it built several stellarators, culminating in the world's largest stellarator Model C in 1962. In 1967 Spitzer returned fully to astrophysics, and in 1970 the Model C was converted to the Symmetrical Tokamak.

Spitzer was an early proponent of space optical astronomy in general. He was involved in the Orbiting Astronomical Observatory launched by NASA in the late 1960s and early 1970s. This project ultimately led to the Hubble Space Telescope and the Spitzer Space Telescope.

In 1981, Spitzer became a founding member of the World Cultural Council.

== Death ==
Spitzer died suddenly on March 31, 1997, after completing a regular day of work at Princeton University. He was buried at Princeton Cemetery and was survived by wife Doreen Canaday Spitzer (1914-2010), four children, and ten grandchildren. Among Spitzer's four children is neurobiologist Nicholas C. Spitzer, who is currently professor and vice chair in neurobiology at UC San Diego.

== Honors ==
Awards

- Fellow of the American Physical Society (1941)
- Member of the United States National Academy of Sciences (1952)
- Fellow of the American Academy of Arts and Sciences (1953)
- Henry Norris Russell Lectureship (1953)
- Member of the American Philosophical Society (1959)
- Bruce Medal (1973)
- Henry Draper Medal of the National Academy of Sciences (1974)
- James Clerk Maxwell Prize for Plasma Physics (1975)
- Gold Medal of the Royal Astronomical Society (1978)
- National Medal of Science (1979)
- Franklin Medal (1980)
- Prix Jules Janssen of the Société astronomique de France (French Astronomical Society) (1980)
- Crafoord Prize (1985)

Named after him

- Asteroid 2160 Spitzer
- Spitzer Space Telescope
- Lyman Spitzer Library in Davenport College, Yale University
- Lyman Spitzer Building at the Princeton Plasma Physics Laboratory in Princeton, NJ
- Lyman Spitzer Planetarium at the Fairbanks Museum and Planetarium in St. Johnsbury, VT
- Answer to the final question on NTN Buzztime's Showdown on September 16, 2008.
- Landau-Spitzer Award (American Physical Society)
