= American School of Classical Studies at Athens =

Research institute in Greece

Coordinates: 37°58′46″N 23°44′53″E

- Greek: Αμερικανική Σχολή Κλασικών Σπουδών στην Αθήνα
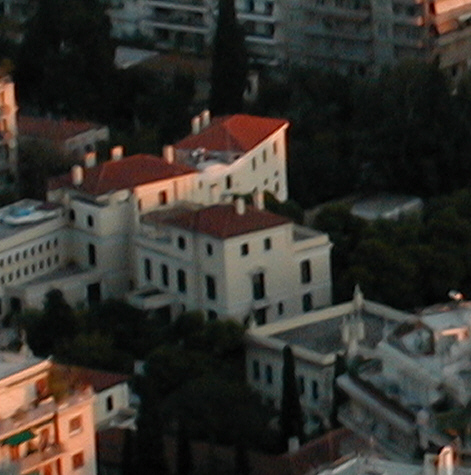
- The ASCSA main building as seen from Mount Lykavittos
- Type: Overseas Research Center / Higher Education
- Established: 1881
- Location: Athens, Greece
- Campus: Urban

The American School of Classical Studies at Athens (ASCSA; Greek: Αμερικανική Σχολή Κλασικών Σπουδών στην Αθήνα) is one of 20 foreign archaeological institutes in Athens, Greece. It is a member of the Council of American Overseas Research Centers (CAORC). CAORC is a private not-for-profit federation of independent overseas research centers that promote advanced research, particularly in the humanities and social sciences, with focus on the conservation and recording of cultural heritage and the understanding and interpretation of modern societies.

== General information ==
With an administrative base in Princeton, New Jersey, and a campus in Athens, the American School of Classical Studies at Athens is one of the leading American research and teaching institutions in Greece, dedicated to the advanced study of all aspects of Greek culture, from antiquity to the present. Founded in 1881, the School is a consortium of nearly 200 colleges and universities in the United States and Canada. It was the first American overseas research center, and today it is the largest of the eighteen foreign institutes in Athens. It also provides the opportunity for students and scholars from around the world to explore the full range of scholarly resources in Greece. The American School operates excavations in the Athenian Agora and Ancient Corinth, two distinguished libraries, an archaeological science laboratory, and a publications department. The School remains, as its founders envisioned, primarily a privately funded, nonprofit educational and cultural institution.

== Governance ==
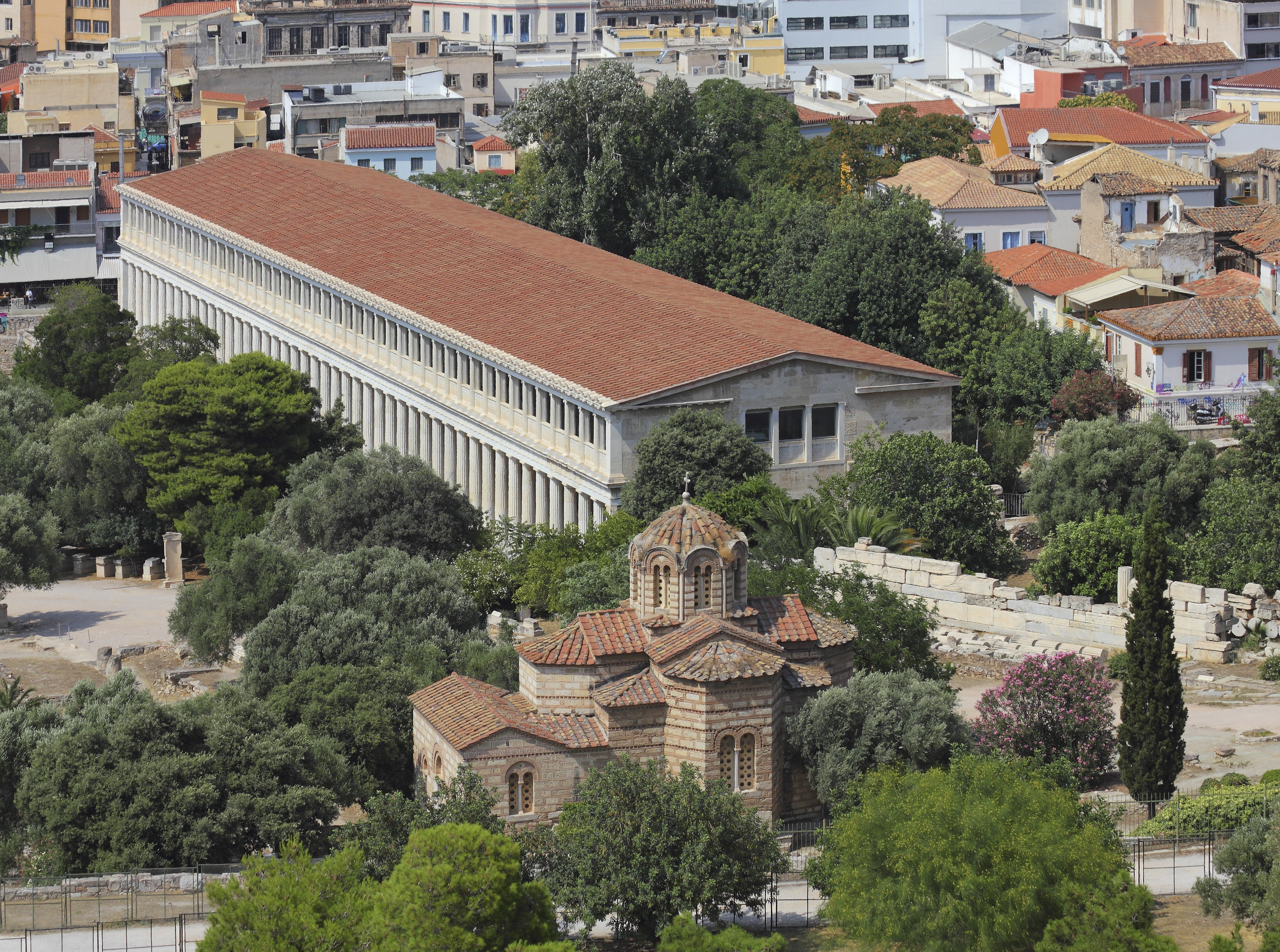
Finds from the ASCSA excavations on the Athenian Agora are displayed in the reconstructed Stoa of Attalos.

The School's academic programs and research facilities are supervised by an academic advisory body known as the Managing Committee, which consists of elected representatives from a consortium of more than 190 North American colleges and universities. The Board of Trustees, composed of distinguished women and men from the world of business, law, philanthropy, and academia, is responsible for the management of the School's endowment, finances, and property, and has legal responsibility for the ASCSA.

=== Archaeological projects ===
The ASCSA has been involved in a large number of archaeological projects, as well as a major program of primary archaeological publications. It is responsible for two of the most important archaeological sites in Greece, the Athenian Agora and Ancient Corinth. The Corinth Excavations commenced in 1896 and have continued to present day with little interruption, and the Athenian Agora excavations first broke ground in 1932. At both sites, the ASCSA operates important museums and extensive facilities for the study of the archaeological record. Excavation records and artifacts are made available to wider audiences via ASCSA.net

=== Affiliated projects ===
Other archaeological projects with ASCSA involvement, past and present, include surveys in the Southern Argolid, in Messenia and at Vrokastro (Crete) and excavations at Olynthus (Greek Macedonia), Samothrace (North Aegean), the islet of Mitrou (Central Greece), Halai (Phthiotis), Isthmia, Kenchreai, Nemea, Sicyon (all in Corinthia), Lerna, Argos, Franchthi cave and Halieis (Argolid), Mt. Lykaion (Acadia), Nichoria and the Palace of Nestor at Pylos (Messenia), Haghia Irini (Keos), as well as Azoria, Mochlos, Gournia, Kavousi and Kommos on Crete.

==== Publications ====
ASCSA publishes the peer-reviewed journal Hesperia quarterly as well as monographs for final reports of archaeological fieldwork conducted under School auspices, supplements to Hesperia, Gennadeion monographs; and miscellaneous volumes relating to the work of the School. These books range in format from large hardbacks to slim paperback guides.

== List of directors ==
- William W. Goodwin (1882 to 1883); first director
- Lewis R. Packard (1883 to 1884)
- James Cooke Van Benschoten (1884 to 1885)
- Frederick De Forest Allen (1885 to 1886)
- Martin L. D'Ooge (1886 to 1887)
- Augustus C. Merriam (1887 to 1888)
- Charles Waldstein (1889 to 1892)
- Frank B. Tarbell (1892 to 1893)
- Rufus B. Richardson (1893 to 1903)
- Theodore Woolsey Heermance (1903 to 1905)
- William Nickerson Bates (1905 to 1906); acting
- Bert Hodge Hill (1906 to 1926)
- Carl Blegen (1926 to 1927); acting
- Rhys Carpenter (1927 to 1932)
- Richard Stillwell (1932 to 1935)
- Edward Capps (1935 to 1936)
- Charles Hill Morgan (1936 to 1938)
- Henry Lamar Crosby (1938 to 1939); acting
- Gorham Phillips Stevens (1939 to 1941)
- Arthur Wellesley Parsons (1941 to 1946); on leave for war service
- Gorham Phillips Stevens (1941 to 1947); acting
- Rhys Carpenter (1946 to 1948); not in residence
- Oscar Broneer (1947 to 1948); acting
- Carl Blegen (1948 to 1949)
- John Langdon Caskey (1949 to 1959)
- Henry S. Robinson (1959 to 1969)
- James Robert McCredie (1969 to 1977)
- Richard Stillwell (1974); acting
- Henry R. Immerwahr (1977 to 1982)
- Stephen G. Miller (1982 to 1987)
- William D. E. Coulson (1987 to 1997)
- James D. Muhly (1997 to 2002)
- Stephen V. Tracy (2002 to 2007)
- Jack L. Davis (2007 to 2012)
- James C. Wright (2012 to 2017)
- Jenifer Neils (2017 to 2022)
- Bonna Daix Wescoat (2022 to 2027)

== List of Assistant Directors ==
- Carl Blegen (1920 to 1926)
- Benjamin Dean Meritt (1926 to 1928)
- Stephen Luce (1928 to 1929)
- Richard Stillwell (1931 to 1932)
- Charles Hill Morgan (1935 to 1936)
- Arthur Wellesley Parsons (1931 to 1941)
- John Langdon Caskey (1948 to 1949)
- Henry S. Robinson (1958 to 1959)
- Nick Blackwell (2012 to 2015)
- Dylan K. Rogers (2015 to 2019)
- Eric W. Driscoll (2019 to 2021)
- Simone Agrimonti (2021 to 2022)
- Carolin (Katie) Garcia Fine (2022 to present)

== List of alumni ==
- Jotham Johnson (1926)
- Doreen Canaday Spitzer (1936 to 1938)
- George Leonard Huxley

== Bibliography ==
- E. Korka et al. (eds.): Foreign Archaeological Schools in Greece, 160 Years, Athens, Hellenic Ministry of Culture, 2006, pp. 18–29.
- L. Lord: A History of the American School of Classical Studies at Athens: An Intercollegiate Experiment, 1882–1942.
- L. Shoe Meritt: A History of the American School of Classical Studies at Athens: 1939–1980.
