= Evelyn Lord Smithson =

Classicist and archaeologist of ancient Greece

- Born: 19 July 1923; Indiana
- Died: 9 March 1992 (aged 68); Amherst, New York
- Education: Bryn Mawr College
- Occupation: Classical archaeologist
- Employer: University at Buffalo - SUNY

Evelyn Lord Smithson (born July 19, 1923; died March 9, 1992, in Amherst, New York) was a noted twentieth-century scholar of classics and Classical archaeology and an expert on Bronze Age and Early Iron Age Greece.

Evelyn Lord Smithson was educated at the University of Washington (1944) and at Bryn Mawr College where she took her Master's degree (1944) and her doctorate in Classical archaeology and ancient Greek in 1956. She was a student at the American School of Classical Studies in Athens from 1948 to 1950.

She is particularly known for her work on Iron Age burials in the area of the ancient Agora of Athens and especially for excavating the grave of the so-called "Rich Athenian Lady".

Smithson held a number of professional appointments during her life. These included a posting at the Institute for Advanced Study (1951–1962), the University at Buffalo - SUNY (1962–1992), and the American School of Classical Studies in Athens.

== Scholarship ==
- 1961. "The Protogeometric Cemetery at Nea Ionia, 1949." Hesperia: The Journal of the American School of Classical Studies at Athens Vol. 30, No. 2 (Apr. - Jun., 1961), pp. 147–178.
- 1968. "The Tomb of a Rich Athenian Lady, CA. 850 B.C." Hesperia: The Journal of the American School of Classical Studies at AthensVol. 37, No. 1 (Jan. - Mar., 1968), pp. 77–116.
- 1974. "A Geometric Cemetery on the Areopagus: 1897, 1932, 1947." Hesperia: The Journal of the American School of Classical Studies at Athens Vol. 43, No. 3 (Jul. - Sep., 1974), pp. 325–390.
- John K. Papadopoulos and Evelyn Lord Smithson. 2002. "The Cultural Biography of a Cycladic Geometric Amphora: Islanders in Athens and the Prehistory of Metics." Hesperia: The Journal of the American School of Classical Studies at Athens Vol. 71, No. 2 (Apr. - Jun., 2002), pp. 149–199.
- John K. Papadopoulos and Evelyn Lord Smithson. 2017. The Early Iron Age: The Cemeteries (Agora XXXVI). The American School of Classical Studies at Athens.

== Necrology ==
- "Evelyn Smithson, 68, Archeologist of Athens" The New York Times March 13, 1992
- John K. Papadopoulos. "Evelyn Lord Smithson, 1923-1992." American Journal of Archaeology Vol. 98, No. 3 (Jul., 1994), pp. 563–564.
