= Association of American Weather Observers =

Association of American Weather Observers (2005)
- Association of American Weather Observers
- AAWO logo created in 2006 and used until 2010
- Abbreviation: AAWO
- Formation: September 20, 2005
- Dissolved: June 16, 2010; 15 years ago
- Purpose: Increase public awareness of extreme weather and share stories of it
- Main organ: American Weather Observer (newsletter)

Association of American Weather Observers (1983)
- Association of American Weather Observers
- AAWO logo created in 1983 and used until 1993
- Abbreviation: AAWO
- Formation: October 1983
- Founded at: Westwood, New Jersey, US
- Dissolved: 1993; 33 years ago
- Purpose: Increase public awareness of extreme weather and share stories of it
- Main organ: American Weather Observer (newspaper owned by Belvidere Republican)

The Association of American Weather Observers was a group of amateur weather observers from around the United States. Their aim was to educate the public on weather awareness and to simply share stories among themselves on recent extreme weather that they viewed at their location.

The AAWO originally began in 1983 in Westwood, New Jersey as a group of weather enthusiasts came together in October of that year to create the organization. This iteration disbanded in 1993 due to conflicts of interests. In 2005, a new organization under the same name was created. Unlike the first, the new AAWO had yet to create a President and Board of directors. The AAWO that was established in 1983 and ended in 1993 is in no way affiliated with nor associated with the later organization that was established in 2005. However, some who were prominent members of the first AAWO had shown support for the new surge in bringing back the organization.

== Education, communication, cooperation ==
When the AAWO began in 1983, their motto was "Education, Communication, Cooperation" and opened the door for amateur weather observers from all over the United States to communicate with each other via the American Weather Observer newspaper publication. Before the AAWO there was no nationally recognized organization for the amateur weather hobbyist to share stories and observational data among each other. The group not only had individual memberships, but also had a lengthy list of affiliate organizations that were mostly local or regional groups from within the U.S.. The restart of the AAWO in 2005 had the same basic plans as the old group had in 1983. One of the differences between the group created in 1983 versus 2005 is, in 2005, the American Weather Observer publication was owned and operated by the AAWO, where the publication created in 1984 was a separate entity owned by the Belvidere Republican in Belvidere, Illinois, and only affiliated themselves with the AAWO organization created in 1983 as the newspapers official network.

== Timeline ==
- 1983: The Association of American Weather Observers (AAWO) was created.
- 1984: The AAWO began a monthly publication, in conjunction with the Belvidere Republican in Belvidere, Illinois, in the format of a newspaper called the American Weather Observer (AWO). Weather-related stories and weather observations recorded by the membership would be the major content of the newspaper.
- 1993: The American Weather Observer (monthly publication of the AAWO) announced its separation from the AAWO in their June issue and became a "stand-alone" publication. Meanwhile, the board members of the AAWO, in an official letter to their affiliate organizations, announced the ending of the AAWO.
- 2005: The AAWO, under a new format, made a return on September 20 in the form of a web site https://web.archive.org/web/20060614230631/http://www.aawo.net/
- 2006: The AAWO begins a newsletter style publication under the same name used by the old AAWO, The American Weather Observer, in a periodic newsletter style format.
- 2010: On June 16, the Association of American Weather Observers ceased operations.

== Former Affiliate Organizations Of The Previous AAWO In 1992 ==
- Akin AAWO Chapter
- American Meteorological Society
- Appalachian Weather Network
- Atlantic Coast Observer Network
- Barton ATC, (Murfreesboro, Tennessee)
- Blue Hill Observatory Weather Club
- Commercial Weather Services Association
- Junior's Chapter-AAWO
- KBIM Sun Country Weather Watchers (Roswell, New Mexico)
- KCNC-TV Weather Watchers (Denver, Colorado)
- KECI-TV Weather Watchers (Missoula, Montana)
- KGW-TV Weather Network (Portland, Oregon)
- KKTV-Weather Spotters (Colorado Springs, Colorado)
- KSEE-24 Association of Central California Weather Observers (Fresno, California)
- KFOR Television Weather Watchers (Oklahoma City, Oklahoma)
- KVUE-TV 24 Weather Watchers (Austin, Texas)
- KXLY's Pacific Northwest Weather Observers (Spokane, Washington)
- Long Island Weather Observers
- Mount Washington (New Hampshire) Observatory
- Mid-Hudson Valley Weather Observers (Fishkill, New York)
- National Weather Association
- North Dakota Cooperative Rain Gauge Network
- North Jersey Weather Observers
- Northeast Ohio AMS Chapter
- Ocala Star-Banner Weather Watchers (Ocala, Florida)
- Pennsylvania State University Chapter of the AMS)
- Rockland Climate Center (New York)
- 27's Weather Watchers (Harrisburg, Pennsylvania)
- Skywatchers Club of California
- Virginia Weather Observation Network (Central Virginia AMS)
- WDIV-TV 4 Weather Watchers (Detroit, Michigan)
- WDBJ Weather Watchers (Roanoke, Virginia)
- WESH-TV Weather Watchers (Daytona Beach, Florida)
- Western New York AMS Chapter (Buffalo, New York)
- WITI-TV6 Weather Watchers (Milwaukee, Wisconsin)
- WKBT-TV Weather Watchers (La Crosse, Wisconsin)
- WOKR-TV 13 Weather Spotters (Rochester, New York)
- WTMJ-TV Weather Center Observers (Milwaukee, Wisconsin)

== Publication ==
The American Weather Observer was a newsletter publication presented by the Association of American Weather Observers (AAWO).

Each issue had articles pertaining to significant weather events and was also a communications forum for the AAWO membership. The newsletter was mailed out in paperback format and was available on line at their web site in Adobe Acrobat format. This newsletter is sometimes considered a precursor to the use of social media by citizen observers who sought to communicate about weather observations.

== See also ==
- Citizen Weather Observer Program (CWOP)
