= Henry S. Robinson =

American archaeologist

Henry S. Robinson (June 6, 1914 - July 4, 2003 in Eastport, Maine) was an American Classical archaeologist. From 1959 until 1969 he was the Director of the American School of Classical Studies in Athens and leader of the Corinth Excavations from 1959 to 1965. He was the Harold North Fowler Professor of Classical Studies at Case Western Reserve University in Cleveland.

He was married to the Classical Archaeologist Rebecca C. Robinson (1924-2009).

In recognition of his extraordinary service to the American School, the Henry S. Robinson Fellowship was set up in 2009 to encourage and facilitate research at Corinth.

== Notable publications ==
- Pottery of the Roman Period, Chronology . The Athenian agora. Results of excavations conducted by the American School of Classical Studies at Athens V. Princeton, NJ 1959
- Corinth: A Brief History of the City and a Guide to the Excavations Athens. January 1, 1964 ASIN B0007JCXTU
