= Bonna Daix Wescoat =

American art historian

- Occupation: Art historian
- Title: Samuel Candler Dobbs Professor of Art History

Bonna Daix Wescoat is an American art historian and Samuel Candler Dobbs Professor of Art History at Emory University. Her work focuses on ancient Greek art and architecture, particularly Archaic and Hellenistic architecture and sculpture.

Wescoat joined the art history faculty of Emory University in 1982, and helped to build the Michael C. Carlos Museum and the program in ancient Mediterranean studies. In 2021-2022, she served as the interim director of the Carlos Museum. In 2022, she was appointed the Director of the American School of Classical Studies at Athens.

She is also the director of the American excavations in the Sanctuary of the Great Gods on Samothrace. In an interview she recalled, “[i]t was the first place in Greece that I visited, in 1977, and has been my touchstone since the beginning of my career.” Wescoat was a 2014 Guggenheim fellow in the Classics. Her Guggenheim project, “Insula Sacra: Samothrace and the Sanctuary of the Great Gods,” deals with place and cult from the seventh century B.C. through the Renaissance.

== Works ==
- Poets and Heroes: Scenes from the Trojan War (Emory University Michael C. Carlos Museum, 1986)
- Syracuse, the Fairest Greek City (Museo Archeologico Regionale 'Paolo Orsi', 1989)
- ed. Samothracian Connections: Essays in Honor of James R. McCredie with Olga Palagia (Oxbow Books, 2010)
- ed. Architecture of the Sacred: Space, Ritual, and Experience from Classical Greece to Byzantium with Robert G. Ousterhout (Cambridge University Press, 2012)
- The Temple of Athena at Assos (Oxford University Press, 2012)
