= Frederic de Forest Allen =

American classical philologist

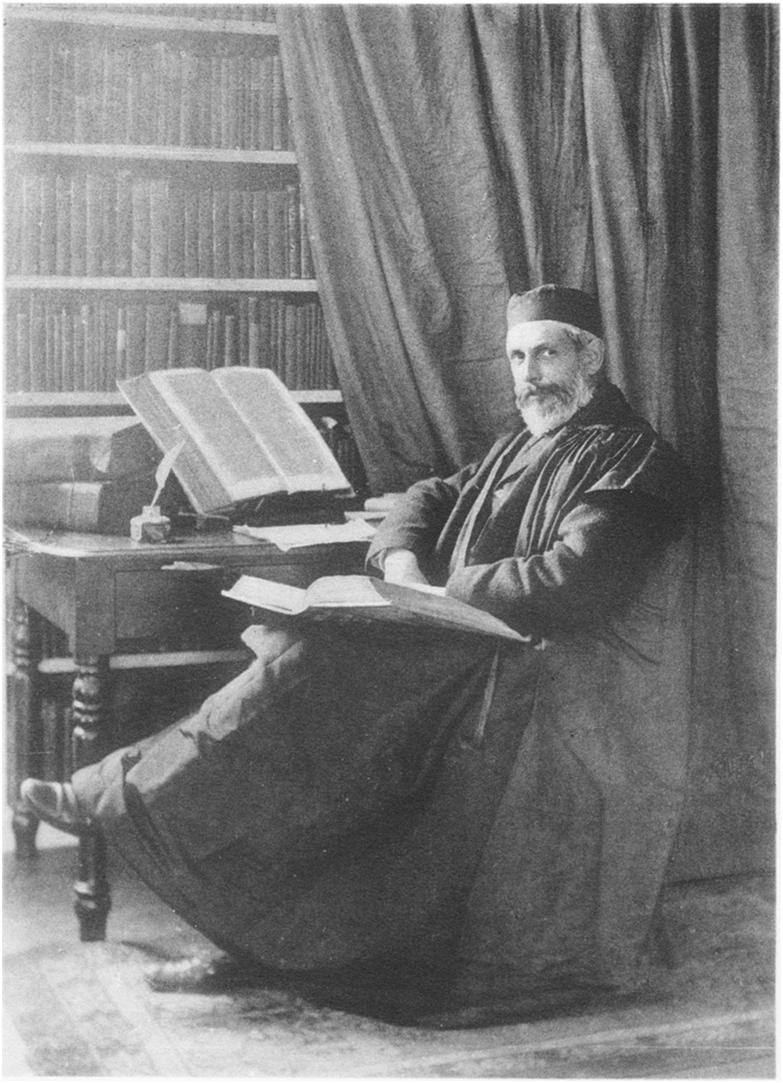
- Born: May 25, 1844; Oberlin
- Died: August 4, 1897; Cambridge
- Education: Oberlin College
- Occupations: Classical philologist, observer, philologist
- Employers: Harvard University; University of Cincinnati; University of Tennessee; Yale University

Frederic de Forest Allen (1844–1897) was an American classical scholar.

== Early life ==
Frederick Forest Allen was born in 1844 in Oberlin, Ohio. He graduated at Oberlin College in 1863.

Allen taught Greek and Latin at the University of Tennessee from 1866 to 1868. He attended the University of Leipzig in Germany from 1868 to 1870, where his thesis supervisor was Georg Curtius. He earned his Ph.D. there with his thesis De Dialecto Locrensium.

== Career ==
Allen was Professor of Foreign Languages at the University of Cincinnati, and at Yale College. He held the chair of classical philology at Harvard for the last seventeen years of his life.

== Death ==
He died in 1897 in Cambridge, Massachusetts.

== Bibliography ==
- Remnants of Early Latin (1880)
- A revision of Hadley's A Greek Grammar for Schools and Colleges (1884)
- Greek Versification in Inscriptions (1888)
- Æschylus: The Prometheus Bound and the Fragments of the Prometheus Unbound (1897)

== External sources ==
- Frederic de Forest Allen at the Database of Classical Scholars, author: Meyer Reinhold
