= James D. Muhly =

American archeologist (1936–)

James David Muhly
- Born: May 6, 1936; Minneapolis, Minnesota, U.S.
- Education: Roosevelt High School; University of Minnesota (B.A.) Yale (PhD)
- Employer(s): University of Minnesota (1964–1967); University of Pennsylvania (1967–1997); American School of Classical Studies at Athens (1997–2002)
- Known for: Director of the American School of Classical Studies in Athens (1997–2002)
- Spouse: Polymnia Metaxas (m. 1961)

James David "Jim" Muhly (born May 6, 1936) is an American archeologist and a former director of the American School of Classical Studies in Athens from 1997 to 2002. His research focused on ancient metallurgy.

== Life and education ==
Muhly was born to Gordon David and Violet Lucille Muhly, His mother was of Swedish descent and his father of German descent. He has two sisters, Carolyn and Mary, and grew up in South Minneapolis. He graduated from Roosevelt High School in 1954, where he played Trombone in the school band. He attended the University of Minnesota for his bachelor's degree, originally planning on chemistry, before being "enticed" by ancient history.

His wife, Polymnia bore a daughter, Elizabeth, in the summer of 1962, while he was abroad in Greece. Two sons, Nicholas and Alexis, were born while he was at Penn in 1968 and 1970, respectively.

== Career ==
He is a professor emeritus of Asian and Middle Eastern Studies at the University of Pennsylvania. He directed the excavations at Tel Michal and Tel Gerisa in Israel. He co-directed the excavations at Chrysokamino in Crete. He also received the Archaeological Institute of America's Pomerance Award for Scientific Contributions to Archaeology.
