= Stephen V. Tracy =

American classicist (born 1941)

Stephen Victor Tracy (born 1941) is an American scholar of Classics specializing in ancient Greek epigraphy.

Tracy is best known for devising a method for recognizing the work of individual inscribers in Greek inscriptions. It was long thought that the intractability of the medium (hammer and chisel on marble) made this impossible, but by treating the inscribed letters as a kind of handwriting he has been able to establish careers for many cutters, to join discrete fragments, to date inscriptions more accurately than in the past, and often thereby make it possible to reach a new understanding of historical events.

== Education and career ==
- Tracy received his BA in Classics from Brown University in 1963 and PhD in Classical Philology from Harvard University in 1968.
- He was an instructor and assistant professor Wellesley College, 1965–71, and professor of Greek and Latin at Ohio State University, 1971-2002. From 2002 until 2007 Tracy was director of the American School of Classical Studies at Athens. He has had a long association with the Institute for Advanced Study in Princeton: member in 1987–88, 90 and 91, Mellon Fellow 1996-97, and long-term visitor from 2007 to 2016. He was a visiting associate at the Institute until July 2024.
- He was the creator and first director of the Center for Epigraphic and Paleographic Studies at The Ohio State University. He oversaw the Packard Humanities Institute-funded project there to digitize all ancient Greek epigraphical texts.

== Selected publications ==
=== Books ===
- Athenian Lettering of the Fifth Century B.C.: the Rise of the Professional Letter Cutter (Walter de Gruyter 2016)
- Pericles: A Sourcebook and Reader (University of California Press, 2009)
- Athens and Macedon: Attic Letter-Cutters of 300 to 229 B.C. (University of California Press, 2003)
- Athenian Democracy in Transition: Attic Letter-Cutters of 340 to 290 B.C. (University of California Press, 1995)
- The Story of the Odyssey (Princeton University Press, 1990)
- Attic Letter-Cutters of 229 to 86 B.C. (University of California Press, 1990)
- IG II2 2336 Contributors of First Fruits for the Pythaïs, Beitrage zur Klassischen Philologie, Heft 139 (Meisenheim, 1982)
- The Lettering of an Athenian Mason, Hesperia Supplement XV (Princeton, 1975)

=== Books co-authored ===
- Inscriptiones Graecae II/III3 1.5: Inscriptiones Atticae Euclidis anno posteriores. Ed. tertia. Pars I: Fasc. 5: Leges et decreta annorum 229/8–168/7 (with V. N. Bardani) Berlin-Brandenburg Academy of Sciences (Walter de Gruyter, 2012)
- Greek and Latin Inscriptions in the USA: A Checklist (with J. Bodel), American Academy in Rome (Rome 1997)
- The Games at Athens (with Jenifer Neils), ASCSA (Princeton 2003)

=== Selected articles ===
- “Eurykleides I of Kephisia and the Office of Hoplite General in Athens,” pp. 291–298 in ΑΞΩΝ Studies in Honor of Ronald S. Stroud edd. A. P. Matthaiou and N. Papzarkadas (Athens 2015)
- “Agora I 6701: A Panathenaic Victor List of ca. 190 B.C.,” Hesperia 84, 2015, 713-721
- “The Dramatic Festival Inscriptions of Athens: The Inscribers and Phases of Inscribing,” Hesperia 84, 2015, 553-581
- “The Hands of IG I^{3} 421-430, the so-called Attic Stelai,” pp. 259–284 in ΑΘΗΝΑΙΩΝ ΕΠΙΣΚΟΠΟΣ: Studies in honour of Harold B. Mattingly edd. A. P. Matthaiou and R. K. Pitt (Athens 2014)
- “Athens in Crisis: The Second Macedonian War,” pp. 13–26 in Ancient Documents and their Contexts edd. J Bodel and N. Dimitrova (Leiden 2014)
- “Down Dating Some Athenian Decrees with Three-Bar Sigma: A Paleographic Approach,” Zeitschrift für Papyrologie und Epigraphik 190, 2014, 105-115
- “The Wrongful Execution of the Hellenotamiai (Antiphon 5.69-71) and the Lapis Primus,” Classical Philology 109, 2014, 1-10
- “The Study of Hands on Greek Inscriptions: The Need for a Digital Approach” (with C. Papaodysseus), AJA 113, 2009, 99-102
- “The Statue Bases of Praxiteles Found in Athens,” Zeitschrift für Papyrologie und Epigraphik 167, 2008, 27-32
- “A New List of Athenian Ephebes and a New Archon of Athens” (with V. Bardani), Zeitschrift für Papyrologie und Epigraphik 163, 2007, 75-80
- “Identifying Hands on Ancient Athenian Inscriptions: First Steps towards a Digital Approach” (with C. Papaodysseus, P. Roussopoulos, M. Panagopoulos, D. Frgoulis, D. Dafi, and Th. Panagopoulos), Archaeometry 49, 2007, 749-764
- “Games at the Lesser Panathenaia?,” pages 53–57 in O. Palagia and A. Choremi-Spetsieri (eds.), The Panathenaic Games (Oxford, 2007)
- “Antigonos Gonatas, King of Athens,” pages 56–60 in The Macedonians in Athens 322 – 229 B.C. (Oxford 2003)
- “A Major Athenian Letter-Cutter of ca. 410 to ca. 380: The Cutter of IG II2 17,” pages 351 to 363 in Gestures: Essays Presented to Alan L. Boegehold (Oxford 2003)
- “Herodotus and Xanthippus, Father of Pericles” 315-319 in Noctes Atticae Festschrift for J. Mejer (Copenhagen 2002)
- "Dating Athenian Inscriptions: A New Approach," Proceedings of the American Philosophical Society 144, 2000, 67-76
- “The dedicatory inscription to Trajan at the ‘metropolis’ of Petra,” Journal of Roman Archaeology, Suppl. Series 31 (1999) 51-58
- "New and Old Panathenaic Victor Lists," Hesperia 60 (1991), 187-236 (with Ch. Habicht). Reprinted in Ch. Habicht, Athen in Hellenistischer Zeit (Munich 1994) 73-139
