= Charles Odell (cricketer) =

New Zealand cricketer (1830–1875)

Personal information
- Full name: Charles Shead Odell
- Born: 1830; Cambridge, England
- Died: 11 October 1875 (aged 44–45); Christchurch, New Zealand
- Bowling: Right-arm
- Role: All-rounder

Domestic team information
- Years: Team
- 1869-70 to 1870-71: Canterbury

Career statistics
Competition	First-class
Matches	2
Runs scored	14
Batting average	4.66
100s/50s	0/0
Top score	13
Balls bowled	44
Wickets	2
Bowling average	12.50
5 wickets in innings	0
10 wickets in match	0
Best bowling	2/25
Catches/stumpings	1/–
- Source: CricketArchive, 19 October 2020

Charles Shead Odell (1830 – 11 October 1875) was a cricketer who played two matches of first-class cricket for Canterbury in 1869 and 1871.

Odell was born in England, and moved to New Zealand. He was described in 1867 as a "very good bat and change bowler; rather slow in the field". In October 1866 he took 12 wickets and was one of the top-scorers when the United Canterbury club played Ashburton in Ashburton; on the way back to Christchurch the team's coach overturned, and Odell broke his left arm in two places. A few weeks later, still unable to use his left arm, he nevertheless took 10 wickets in a club match. He led the Christchurch batting averages for the 1868–69 season, but was unable to play in Canterbury's annual first-class match against Otago that season owing to illness.

Odell worked in Christchurch as a commercial clerk. He filed for bankruptcy in 1870. Later he worked in the box office at the principal theatre in Christchurch. He died at his home in Christchurch in October 1875, aged 44 or 45.
