= Charles Robert O'Dell =

American astrophysicist (born 1937)

C. Robert O'Dell
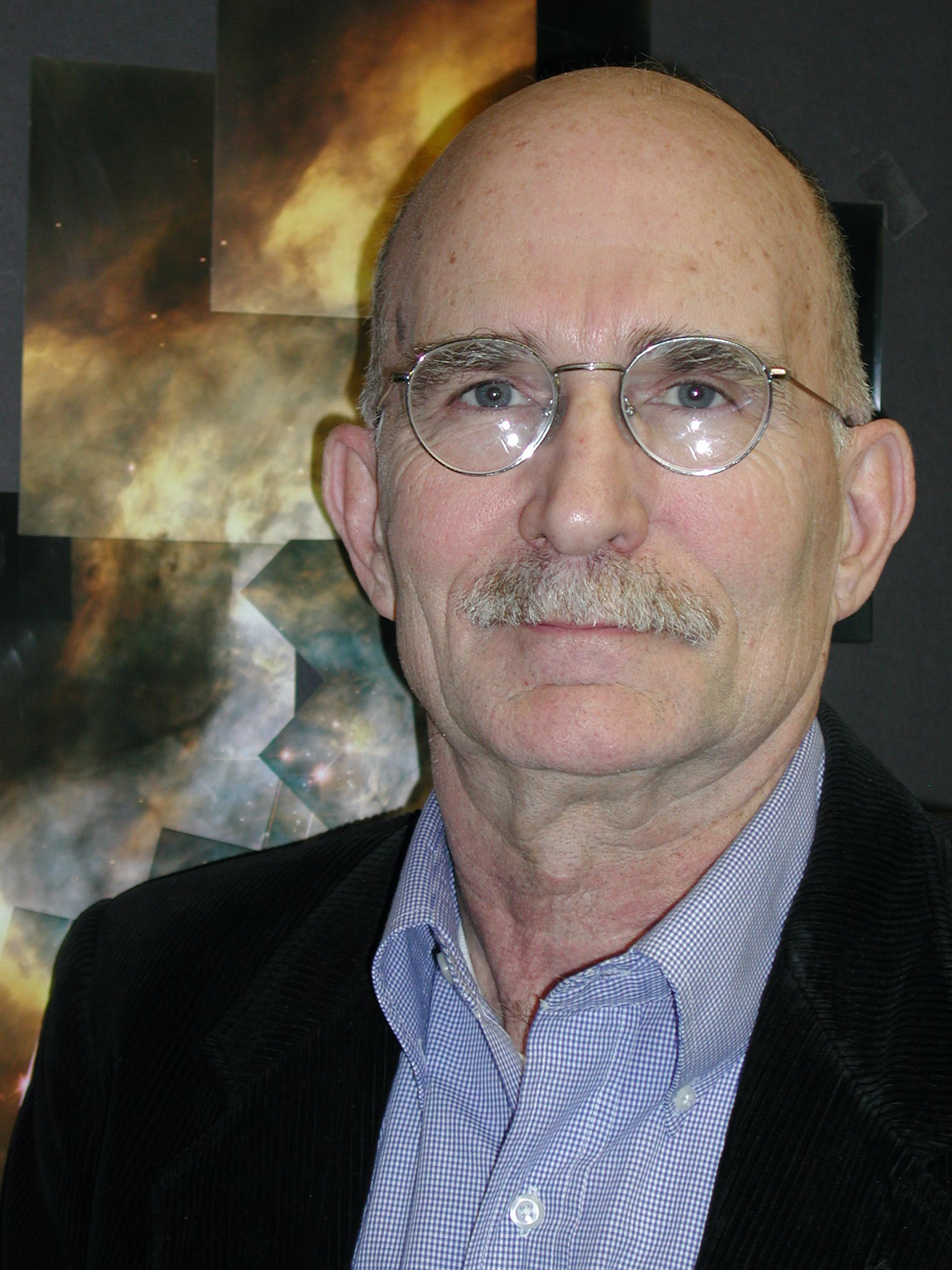
- O'Dell in 2005
- Born: Charles Robert O'Dell; 1937 (age 88–89); Hamilton County, Illinois
- Education: Illinois State University (B.S.Ed.); University of Wisconsin (PhD)
- Awards: Order of Merit, Poland (1977); Public Service Medal, NASA (1991); Humboldt Prize (1996); Doctor of Science, Illinois State University (2001); Copernicus Astronomical Center Medal (2012); Benedykt Polak Prize, Poland (2016)
- Scientific career
- Fields: Astrophysics
- Workplaces: Mt. Wilson Observatory and Palomar Observatory; University of California at Berkeley; University of Chicago; NASA's Marshall Space Flight Center; Rice University; Vanderbilt University
- Thesis: Photoelectric Measurement and Interpretation of Radiation from Gaseous Nebulae (1962)
- Doctoral advisor: Donald E. Osterbrock
- Website: www.vanderbilt.edu/AnS/physics/cv/odell.html

Charles Robert O'Dell (born 1937) is an American observational astronomer and the founding Project Scientist of the Hubble Space Telescope. He is currently the Distinguished Research Professor of Astrophysics at Vanderbilt University and Andrew Hayes Buchanan professor of Astrophysics (emeritus) at Rice University.

== Biography ==
He attended Illinois State University from 1955 to 1959 and received his PhD from the University of Wisconsin in 1962. In 1962–1963 was a Carnegie Institution for Science Fellow at the combined Mt. Wilson Observatory and Palomar Observatory based in Pasadena, California. From 1963 to 1964 he was an assistant professor at the University of California at Berkeley. In 1964-1972 he was at the University of Chicago, where he became a professor of astronomy and astrophysics, director of Chicago's Yerkes Observatory, and served as chair of his department.

In 1972 he left his Chicago professorship to become the lead scientist on the proposed Large Space Telescope, later renamed the Space Telescope, and finally renamed the Hubble Space Telescope. As Project Scientist with NASA from 1972 to 1983 he successfully led the advocacy for its creation, in spite of initial community pessimism, and its design as a scientific observatory. He then led the formulation of policy for its scientific operation through the Space Telescope Science Institute and the establishment of open access to its data throughout the astronomical community. Later, he was a member of the Space Telescope Science Institute Council (2011–2017), serving as chair from 2013 to 2016. His Hubble Space Telescope papers have been archived in Vanderbilt University's Heard Library Special Collections.

In 1982 he became a professor of space physics and astronomy at Rice University, retiring as Andrew Hayes Buchanan Professor of Astrophysics in 2000. In his present position at Vanderbilt University, he continues his career-long study of the interstellar medium. He has supervised the PhD theses of seven students.

His early research concentrated on the misnamed planetary nebulae, (they are not planets, they only appear in small telescopes like our outer planets). He used observations and theory to establish their role in stellar evolution. Much of his current activity is focused on the nearby star-formation region, the Orion Nebula.

In 1993 he used the Hubble Space Telescope to discover in the Orion Nebula a new class of objects, the proplyds, providing clear-cut proof that ordinary star formation includes disks from which planets can form. Since then, his research has concentrated on how these objects are created and interact with their natal material.

An avid aviator, he participated as a pilot on the USA team in the FAI World Glider Aerobatic Championships in 1985, 1987, 1989, and 1993. As a mountaineer, he teamed in the 1960's with astronomers Donald Morton, George Wallerstein, and Lyman Spitzer on several first-ascents of mountains in British Columbia, Canada.

== Honors and awards ==
He is a Fellow of the American Astronomical Society and the American Association for the Advancement of Science. He received the NASA Public Service Medal in 1991 for his early leadership role on the Hubble Space Telescope. He was awarded a Doctor of Science degree from Illinois State University in 2001. He received the Order of Merit of the Republic of Poland from the Polish State (1977), the Nicolaus Copernicus Astronomical Center Medal (2012), and the Benedykt Polak Prize from the Warsaw Scientific Society (2016) in recognition of his work in establishing the Nicolaus Copernicus Astronomical Center of the Polish Academy of Sciences in Warsaw. He is a foreign member of the Polish Academy of Sciences. He received a Humboldt Prize from the Alexander von Humboldt Foundation in 1996.

== Personal life ==
He is the father of Cynthia Dianne Rogers (1959–) and Nicholle Ann Hardage (1964–) from his marriage (1959–1979) to Elizabeth Ann Perry (née Welty) (1937–).

== Books ==
- Osterbrock, D. E.; O'Dell, C. R. (1968). Planetary Nebulae (first ed.). Springer. ISBN 978-90-277-0135-0.
- O'Dell, Bob (1984). Aerobatics Today (Second ed.). St. Martin's Press. ISBN 0-312-00760-4.
- O'Dell, C. Robert (2003). The Orion Nebula (first ed.). Harvard University Press. ISBN 0-674-01183-X.
