= Rhys Carpenter =

American art historian (1889–1980)

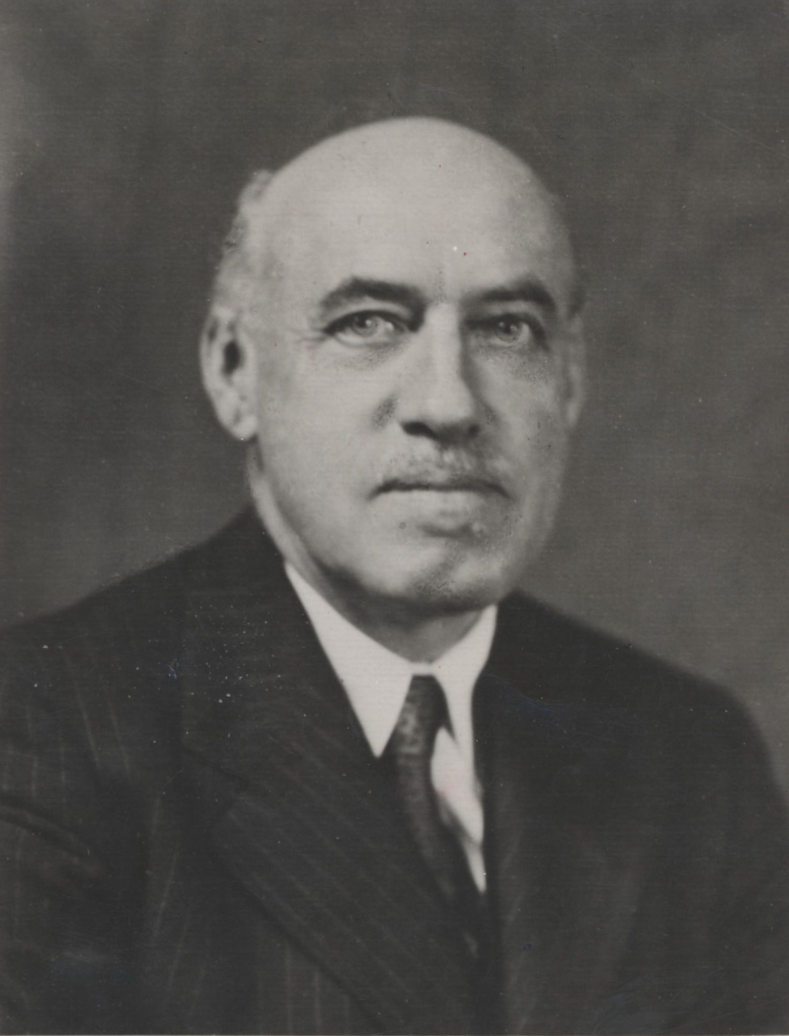
- Carpenter c. 1951
- Born: August 5, 1889; Cotuit, Massachusetts
- Died: January 2, 1980 (aged 90); Devon, Pennsylvania
- Education: Columbia University (B.A., 1909); University of Oxford (B.A., 1911; upgraded to M.A. 1914); Columbia University (Ph.D., 1916)
- Occupations: professor, classical scholar, art historian, author
- Known for: Homeric studies
- Spouse: Eleanor Houston Hill (m. 1918)

Rhys Carpenter (August 5, 1889 – January 2, 1980) was an American classical art historian and professor at Bryn Mawr College.

Carpenter was unconventional as a scholar. He analyzed Greek art from the standpoint of artistic production and behavior. He argued for dating the Greek alphabet to the eighth century B.C.

== Early life and career ==
Carpenter was born in Cotuit, Massachusetts in 1889. He received his B.A. in Classics from Columbia University in 1909. Carpenter won a Rhodes scholarship at the University of Oxford, studying at Balliol College. There he published his own poetry and earned a second B.A. (1911), upgraded to an M.A. in 1914.

He spent the year 1912–13 at the American School of Classical Studies in Athens. The president of Bryn Mawr College, Martha Carey Thomas (1857–1935) invited Carpenter to establish a department of classical archaeology at the college, which he did while completing his own graduate work at Columbia University; he completed his Ph.D. in 1916 with a dissertation on The Ethics of Euripides.

By 1918 he was already a full professor at Bryn Mawr. In 1918 Carpenter married Eleanor Houston Hill. In 1926 Carpenter became professor at the American School of Classical Studies in Athens, and established the school's journal, Hesperia in 1932. He also was instrumental in the planning of the American excavations of the agora in Athens. He returned to teaching at Bryn Mawr College and also delivered the Martin Classical Lectures at Oberlin College, which appeared in print as The Humanistic Value of Archaeology (1933). He was elected to the American Philosophical Society in 1935. He delivered the Sather lectures in 1946 on "Folk tale, fiction, and saga in the Homeric epics."

== Retirement ==
Carpenter retired in 1955. In his retirement, he held visiting professorships at the University of Pennsylvania (1960), was Andrew W. Mellon professor at the University of Pittsburgh (1961–62), and visiting scholar at the University of Washington (1963–64). He was awarded the Gold Medal of the Archaeological Institute of America in 1969.

One year before his death, Dr. Carpenter was forced from his estate, "Jerry Run", by the government so that Marsh Creek State Park lake could be built.

== Death ==
He died in Devon, Pennsylvania in 1980.

== Legacy ==
Bryn Mawr College dedicated their newly built archaeology library in Carpenter's name and memory in 1997.

== Bibliography ==
- [bibliography to 1969]: Hesperia 38 no. 2 (1969) : 123–132.
- Greek Sculpture: a Critical Review. Chicago: University of Chicago Press, 1960.
- and Ackerman, James. Art and Archaeology. New York: Prentice Hall, 1963.
- Humanistic Value of Archaeology. Cambridge, MA: Harvard University Press, 1933.
- The Esthetic Basis of the Greek Art of the Fifth and Fourth Centuries B.C.. New York: Longmans, Green and Co., 1921, 2nd ed.: Bloomington, IN: Indiana University Press, 1959.
- Ancient Corinth: a guide to the excavations. Athens: Hestia, 1936.
- Art; a Bryn Mawr Symposium. Bryn Mawr, PA: Bryn Mawr College, 1940.
- Discontinuity in Greek Civilization. Cambridge: Cambridge University Press, 1966.
- Folk Tale: Fiction and Saga in the Homeric Epics. Berkeley: University of California Press, 1946.
- The Greeks in Spain. New York: Longmans, Green and Co., 1925.
- Historical Aspects of the Fine Arts: Addresses by Rhys Carpenter [and others]. Oberlin, OH: Oberlin College, 1938.
- The Sun-Thief, and Other Poems. London: H. Milford, 1914.
