= Observer (meteorological) =

Recorder of the weather

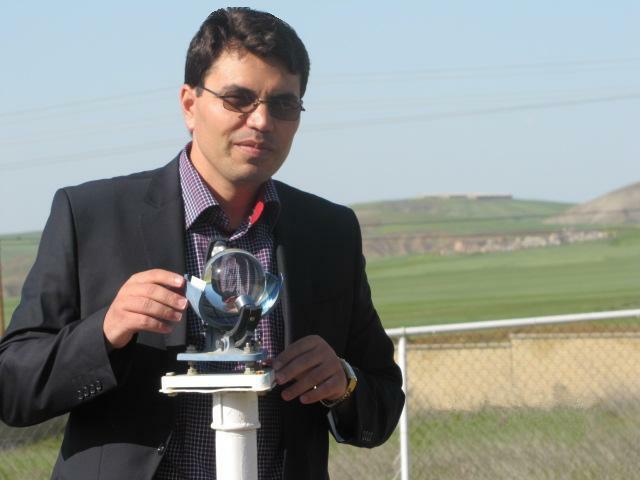
- A Weather Station Observer at Germi, Ardabil, Iran.

Occupation
- Names: Observer, Meteorological Watch, Synoptic Expert
- Occupation type: Technician
- Activity sectors: Weather services and scientific research

Description
- Competencies: Meteorological and climatic knowledge
- Education required: Weather observing courses (varies by country)
- Fields of employment: Meteorological Stations

A meteorological observer, or weather observer, is a person authorized by a weather authority to make or record meteorological observations. They are technicians who are responsible for the accurate observation, rapid measurement, timely collection, recording, and timely submission of meteorological parameters and information and various atmospheric phenomena to the Meteorological Center. Surface, upper air, radar, and satellite are all forms of weather observations.

== Role ==
Meteorological observers play a key role in many flood, drought, environmental and water resources applications. Whilst rainfall observations are most widely used, other parameters of interest include air temperatures, humidity and wind speeds. The main measurement techniques include raingauges, weather stations and weather radar, with satellite precipitation estimates playing an important role in data-sparse regions.

METARs are generated by both government-owned and privately contracted facilities. The collection of weather data can be automated by machines, such as the AWOS, and the ASOS. These automated facilities help gather large amounts of data.

Surface observations provide specific and relevant information around an airport. The FAA recommends this guideline of information in a report:

- type of report: interval update, or update for rapid changes
- station identifier: 4 letter code
- date and time: date is the first two digits; last four digits are the time in UTC
- modifier: denotes report came from an automated source, or was manually corrected
- wind: first three digits are direction (in tens of degrees), last two digits are wind speed measured in knots
- visibility: reported in statute miles, runway visibility is also reported
- weather phenomena: intensity, proximity, description
- sky condition: amount, height, vertical visibility
- temperature and dew point: measured in Celsius, "M" denotes negative temperature
- altitude: measured in inches of mercury, Hg

The information can be obtained manually or automatically. Although the individual reports cover a small radius, when combined together, they create a larger map of the general area.

== Tasks ==
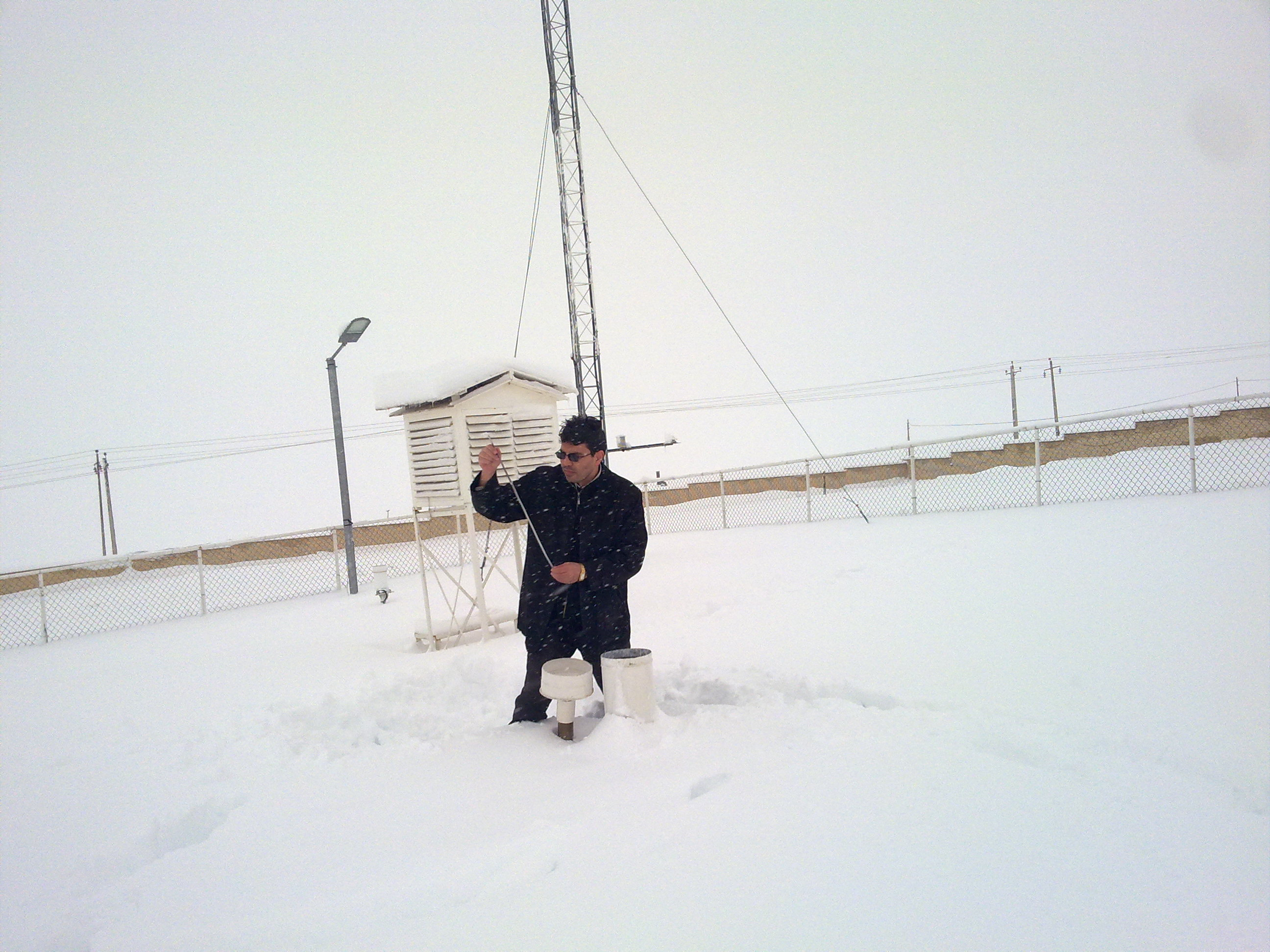
Weather observer in Iran.

A weather observer responsibilities are to collect, record, and map weather conditions. The job usually requires monitoring conditions at all times, so work is usually distributed on shifts around the clock, on weekends, and on holidays as necessary. It is an all weather job, gathering weather information in good as well as in poor weather. Thus, it requires the ability to work in the heat, cold, rain, wind, or other environmental conditions.

The weather observer may research information about other weather station observations to help users plan their activities (such as briefing for pilots) and discuss with meteorologists at central services about weather warnings. Many weather observers specialize in particular areas, such as supporting the military or local news stations, and specialization can affect future career options.

== Qualifications ==
A weather observer needs a technical training and certification from an organization like the National Weather Service. Some use internships or similar experiences to practice observing weather before applying for a full-time job.

Fulfilling the duties of a weather observer requires excellent eyesight, attention to detail, and presentation skills. For certain positions, the ability to direct assistants or support staff is also helpful.

=== Salary ===
In 2021, the average salary for a weather observer in the United States is $52,452 per year, or $25 per hour. The top 10 percent make over $108,000 per year, while the bottom 10 percent earn under $32,000 per year. In Canada, the average salary is CAD$54,174 per year or CAD$26 per hour. Entry level positions start at CAD$39,791 per year, while most experienced workers make up to CAD$66,135 per year.

In other countries, the average observer surface weather gross salary in Yanbu'al Bahr, Saudi Arabia is 200,612 SAR, while in South Africa, the entry level of a weather observer is R245,126, and a senior level weather observer (8+ years of experience) earns an average R407,412.

== See also ==
- Association of American Weather Observers
- Citizen Weather Observer Program
- Cooperative Observer Program
