= Charles Hill Morgan =

American engineer and industrialist (1831–1911)

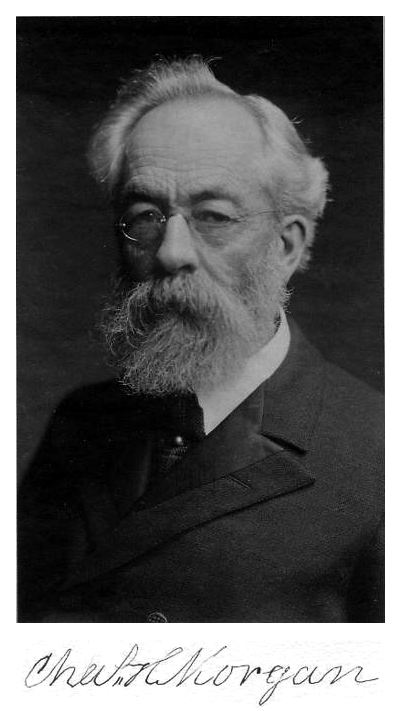
Charles Hill Morgan (1831-1911)

Charles Hill Morgan (January 8, 1831 – January 10, 1911) was an American mechanical engineer, inventor, industrialist and President of the American Society of Mechanical Engineers in the year 1900–01. He is known for his contributions to Worcester and to the steel industry, especially to rod rolling.

== Biography ==
Morgan was born in Rochester, New York in 1831, the son of Hiram and Clarissa L. (Rich) Morgan. He father was a mechanic of such limited means, that Morgan had to start working in a factory at the age of 12. Three years later he became an apprentice in the machine shop the Clinton Mill of his uncle in Clinton, Massachusetts.

At the age of 17 he was taught mechanical drawing by John C. Hoadley, civil engineer of the machine shop, and in 1852 by the age of 21 he was put in charge of the Clinton Mills dye-house. Here he started to study the basics of chemistry. In 1855 he moved to the Lawrence Machine Company of Erastus Brigham Bigelow, where he was mechanical draftsman for five years.

In 1860 he started his own manufacturing company with his brother Francis H. Morgan, that produced and supplied paper bags in Philadelphia. Four years later he became superintendent of manufacturing at the machine factory of Ichabod Washburn, where after another four years he became general superintendent at Washburn and Moen Manufacturing Company.

In 1881 Morgan founded a steel company for the manufacturings of springs, the Morgan Spring Co, and in 1891 another company for the manufacturing of rolling-mills and wire-drawing machinery, Morgan Construction Co. In the year 1900-01 he was President of the American Society of Mechanical Engineers.

The Morgan Construction Company stayed in business, and was sold in 2008 to Siemens for approximately $130 million. By then the company employed about 1.000 people worldwide, and had installed over 400 mills in the steel industry.

== Publications ==
- C. H. Morgan, "Some Landmarks in the History of the Rolling Mill." Transactions of the American Society of Mechanical Engineers 22 (1901): 31-64

Patents

- Patent US203346 - Improvement in processes of wire-drawing, 1878
- Patent US224829 - Art of wire-drawing, 1879.

Publications about Charles Hill Morgan, his family, live and work

- Charles G. Washburn. Industrial Worcester, 1917.
- Philip M. Morgan, The Morgans of Worcester, Nummer 497, 1951.
- Morgan Construction, Morgan milestones: from Worcester to the world: 100 years of progress. 1988.
- Allison Chisolm. The Inventive Life of Charles Hill Morgan: The Power of Improvement In Industry, Education and Civic Life, 2015.
