= Nicholas Spitzer =

American academic

Nicholas Canaday Spitzer is an American neurobiologist, currently working as a Distinguished Professor in the Division of Biological Sciences at the University of California, San Diego.

== Education ==
Spitzer received his B.S and Ph.D from Harvard University and was a postdoctoral fellow at Harvard and University College, London.

== Career ==
Spitzer joined the UCSD faculty in 1972 as an assistant professor. He was a co-director of the UCSD's Kavli Institute for Brain and Mind for 16 years following its establishment.

He has been the recipient of a Sloan Fellowship, a Javits Neuroscience Investigator Award and a Guggenheim Fellowship. He was founding editor-in-chief of BrainFacts.org, a fellow of the American Association for the Advancement of Science, a member of the American Academy of Arts and Sciences, and director of the UCSD Kavli Institute for Brain and Mind. Spitzer's lab is engaged in studying the mechanisms by which neurons differentiate to achieve the unparalleled complexity of the brain.

In 2013 he was elected to the National Academy of Sciences.

=== Awards ===
- 2022 American Philosophical Society's Lashley Award
