= Women in archaeology =

Aspect of the history of archaeology

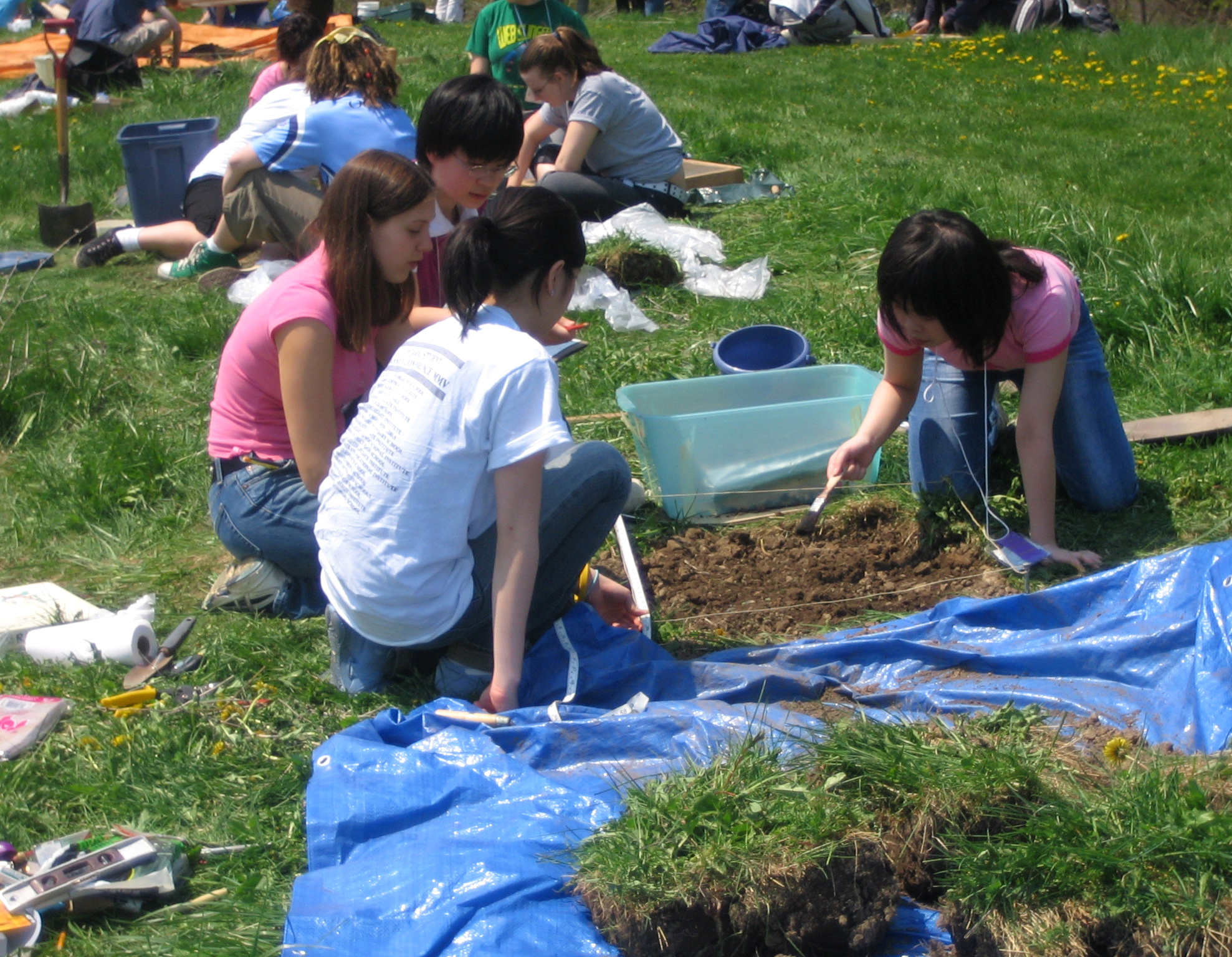
Archaeological Dig at the Ontario Student Classics Conference.

Women in archaeology is an aspect of the history of archaeology and the topic of women in science more generally. In the nineteenth century women were discouraged from pursuing interests in archaeology, however throughout the twentieth century participation and recognition of expertise increased. However women in archaeology face discrimination based on their gender and many face harassment in the workplace.

== History ==
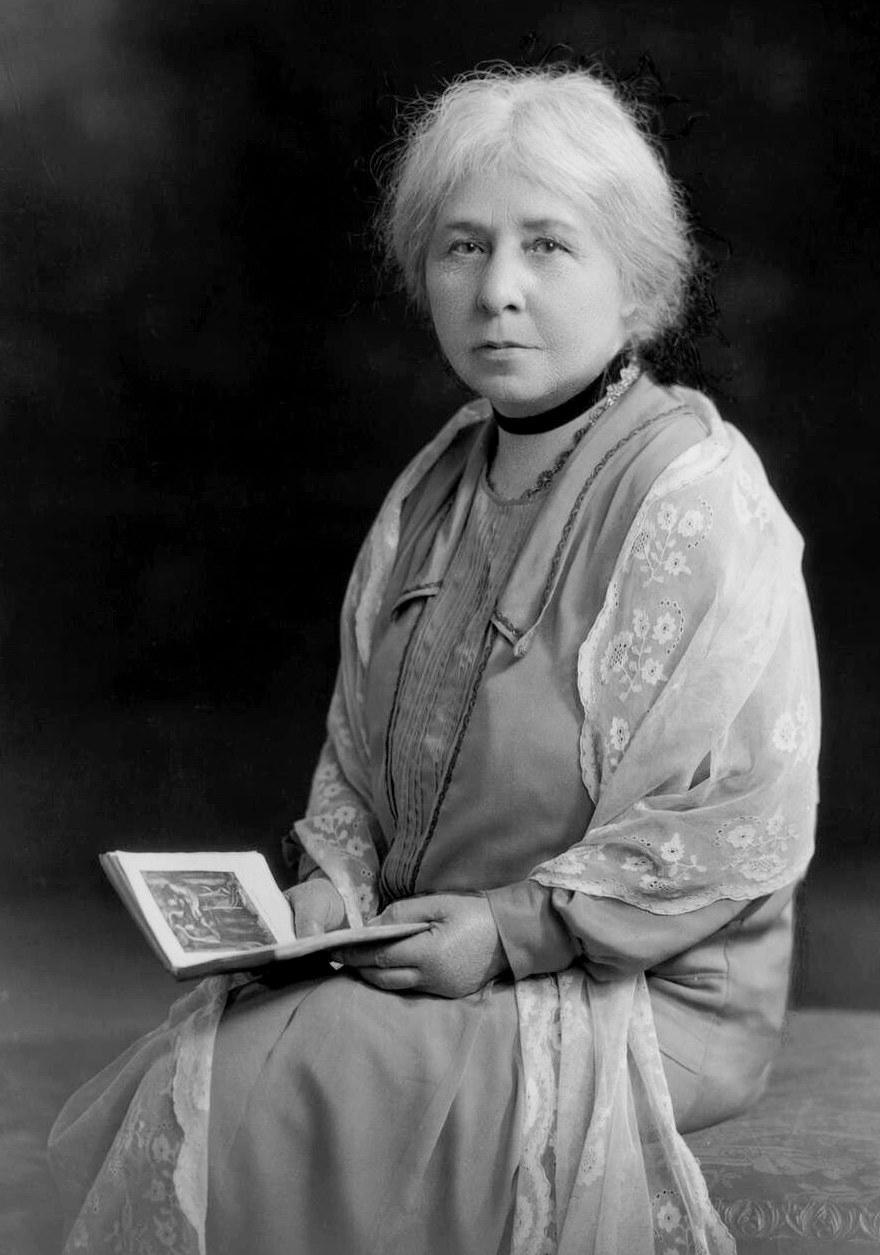
Margaret Murray (1863–1963) was the first woman to be appointed as a lecturer in archaeology in the United Kingdom.

As a professional field of study, archaeology was initially established as an academic discipline in the nineteenth century and typically developed from people engaged in the study of antiquities. Prior to the Victorian era, women in Canada, the United Kingdom and the United States were rarely engaged in professional archaeology (though at this time, archaeology was not so much a profession as the practice of wealthy individuals, with workers paid to undertake the digging). Participation by women in the field was discouraged, both by men and societal pressure, as the occupation masculinized the accepted view of women as homemakers and nurturers. Even after they began to enter the field, the reluctance of male colleagues to accept them in fieldwork, led many women to choose roles outside of academia, seeking positions in museums or in cultural preservation associations. In Europe, women often entered the discipline as research partners with their husbands or to learn about the cultures when their spouses were posted to Colonial outposts or missionary fields.

From the mid-1850s women's higher education facilities began offering separate courses for women and in the 1870s several European countries opened university curricula to women. Though women were accepted into the study of archaeology, they were rarely considered equals and often were not admitted to prestigious societies, or allowed to complete training in the field. Swedish archaeologist Hanna Rydh was one exception, as was French archaeologist Madeleine Colani, but more typical were the hard-fought battles of women such as Edith Hall, Harriet Boyd Hawes, Eugénie Sellers Strong, and Blanche E. Wheeler to undertake excavation projects. More typically, women such as German archaeologist Johanna Mestorf, who worked as a museum curator and academic; writers such as British Egyptologist Amelia Edwards and Persianist Gertrude Bell, and French Persianist Jean Dieulafoy, who traveled and wrote about excavations during their travels; and women like Tessa Wheeler, who assisted her husband by compiling reports and raising money, were the pioneers of women archaeologists.

At the turn of the twentieth century, British women such as Eugénie Sellers Strong, who taught at the Archaeological Institute of America and British School at Rome and Margaret Murray, who lectured at University College London, began to join the ranks of university staff. By the time of World War I, the majority of women working in the archaeology were employed in museums. Noted women archaeological curators or museum directors include Dane Maria Mogensen, Greek Semni Karouzou and Spaniards Concepción Blanco Mínguez and Ursicina Martínez Gallego To carve out their own niches, women typically focused on research close to where they lived or from their native cultures, or undertook studies researching household items typically ignored by men. For example, Marija Gimbutas focused on Eastern European topics even after relocating to the United States; Lanier Simmons, who wanted to study Maya culture, ended up researching closer to home because of family obligations; and Harriet Boyd focused on domestic objects and utensils. Greek Anna Apostolaki, Dane Margrethe Hald, Spaniard Felipa Niño Mas and Swede Agnes Geijer became experts on textiles; Dane Elisabeth Munksgaard focused on clothing, while Norwegian Charlotte Blindheim studied Viking costumes and jewelry. Pottery and art were also topics on which women focused.

Prior to the 1970s, even women like Gertrude Caton-Thompson, Hilda Petrie, and Elizabeth Riefstahl, pioneers in Egyptology who had made distinguished contributions to the field, were omitted from compilations of experts working in the field. If women were mentioned at all, their roles were trivialized. During the New Deal, the Works Progress Administration sponsored excavations at mound sites in Alabama, Georgia and North Carolina, which allowed women of color and working-class women to participate in archaeological work; however, class- and race-based definitions of femininity curtailed broad participation by white women, who tended to focus on participating in amateur organizations.

== Archaeological conservation ==
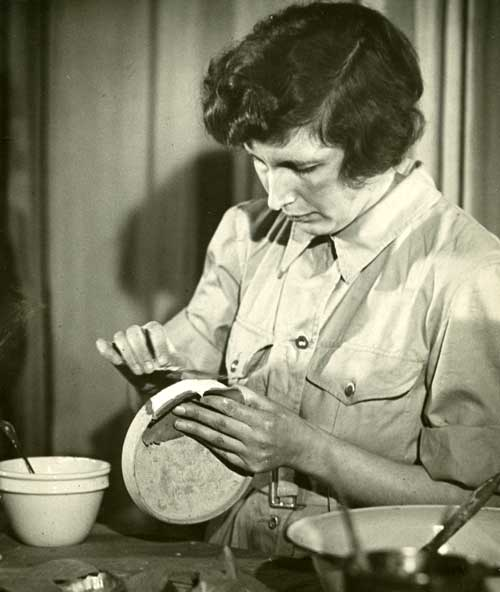
Ione Gedye (1907–1990) established the conservation department at the UCL Institute of Archaeology.

The formal conservation of archaeological objects in Western museum environments from the 1880s onwards was dominated by male scientists and technicians. However, conservation of objects in the field and in educational settings was predominantly performed by women, often the wives and relatives of male archaeologists. Similarly to female archaeologists, these expert contributions to archaeological practice were omitted from official publications and records of archaeological work undertaken.

The expertise of early female conservators was then applied and refined at the Institute of Archaeology at St John's Lodge, Regents Park, from 1937 to 1959. When the Institute of Archaeology moved to Gordon Square in 1959, a conservation teaching programme was established by Ione Gedye who continued to teach at the institute from 1937 to 1975.

The objects treated at the Lodge formed the basis of the Institute of Archaeology collections, including the Petrie Palestine collection. These collections were instrumental in establishing the Institute of Archaeology as an internationally significant centre of archaeological study.

== Contemporary issues ==
=== History of women in the discipline ===
Critically analyzing the role of women in archaeology from the professionalisation of the discipline in the 19th century to the present day is a crucial task to undertake. Although there are some publications on the subject, it can be said that in general we know little about it, and that the absence of women in the histories of archaeology should lead us to reflect urgently on the way disciplinary chronicles are written.

=== Glass ceiling ===
Statistics show that women experience a glass ceiling in academic archaeology. Sue Hamilton, the director of the UCL Institute of Archaeology, noted that 60–70% of the institute's undergraduate and postgraduate students were women, as were the majority of its postdoctoral researchers. However, the proportion of women amongst permanent academic staff has never been more than 31%. Women are progressively further under-represented in each academic rank at the institute: 38% of lecturers are female, 41% of senior lecturers, 17% of readers, and just 11% of professors. A 2016 study found a similar pattern in Australian universities. Whilst 41% of academic archaeologists were women, there was an imbalance in female representation in research fellowships (67%) compared to higher-ranked lecturing posts (31%). This study identified a "two-tiered" glass ceiling: women were less likely to obtain permanent tenure-track positions, and those that did also found it more difficult to advance to senior ranks. In 1994, around 15% of the archaeologists working in the top 30 academic institutions for the field were women.

On the other hand, it was within academic archaeology that women first broke the glass ceiling at a number of British universities. Dorothy Garrod was the first woman to hold a chair (in any subject) at either the University of Cambridge or the University of Oxford, having been appointed Disney Professor of Archaeology at Cambridge in 1939. Kathleen Kenyon was acting director of the Institute of Archaeology, University of London, during the Second World War. Rosemary Cramp was the first woman to hold a chair at the University of Durham, having been appointed Professor of Archaeology in 1971.

=== Sexual harassment and assault ===
In 2014, the Survey Academic Field Experiences (SAFE) surveyed nearly 700 scientists on their experiences of sexual harassment and sexual assault during fieldwork. The survey was aimed at field researchers across a range of disciplines (e.g. anthropologists, biologists), but archaeologists constituted the largest group of respondents. The survey confirmed that sexual harassment and assault were "systemic" problems at field sites, with 64% of respondents reporting that they had personally experienced harassment and 20% that they had personally experienced sexual assault. Women, who made up the majority of the respondents (77.5%), were significantly more likely to have experienced both and were also more likely to report that such experiences were occurred "regularly" or "frequently". The targets were almost always students or early career researchers, and the perpetrators were most likely to be more senior members of the research team, although harassment and assault from peers and members of local communities were also relatively common. The experiences reported ranged from "inadvertent alienating behavior" to unwanted sexual advances, sexual assault and rape. Few respondents found that there were adequate codes of conduct or reporting procedures in place. The authors of the SAFE survey emphasised the significant negative impacts that such experiences of have on victims' job satisfaction, performance, career progression, and physical and mental health.

== Notable women archaeologists ==
- Linda Braidwood (1909–2003), United States, Near Eastern Archaeology
- Gertrude Caton-Thompson (1888–1985), United Kingdom, Egyptologist
- Gemma Sena Chiesa (1929–2024), Italy, Ancient Rome
- Grace Crowfoot (1879–1957), United Kingdom, archaeological textiles
- Niède Guidon (Born 1933), Brazil, Pre-Historic Archeology of South American civilizations
- Frederica de Laguna (1906–2004), United States, Native Alaskan cultures
- Caroline Dormon (1888–1971), United States, indigenous peoples of Louisiana
- Edith Hall Dohan (1877–1943), United States, Etruscan and Mediterranean civilizations
- Cecily Margaret Guido (1912-1994), United Kingdom, prehistoric settlements
- Harriet Boyd Hawes (1871–1945), United States, Minoan and Mediterranean cultures
- Dorothy Cross Jensen (1906–1972), United States, Iraq and indigenous peoples of New Jersey
- Semni Karouzou (1897–1994), Greece, Classical Archaeology
- Mary Butler Lewis (1903–1970), United States, Hudson Valley
- Margaret Murray (1863–1963), India/United Kingdom, Egyptologist
- Hilda Petrie (1871–1957), Ireland, Egyptologist
- Dorothy Popenoe (1899–1932), United Kingdom, Honduran Maya and Pre-Columbian era
- Tatiana Proskouriakoff (1909–1985), Russia/United States, Guatemalan and Mexican Maya
- Elizabeth Riefstahl (1889–1986), United States, Egyptologist
- Doris Stone (1909–1994), United States, Costa Rican and Honduran prehistory
- Marian E. White (1921—1975), United States, Erie people, Neutral Nation, Wenrohronon
- Sara Yorke Stevenson (1847–1921), United States, Egyptology and Near East
- Zheng Zhenxiang (1929–2024), China, Shang dynasty
- Marija Gimbutas (1921–1994), Lithuania/United States, Neolithic and Bronze Age cultures of Old Europe and Kurgan hypothesis

== Gallery ==
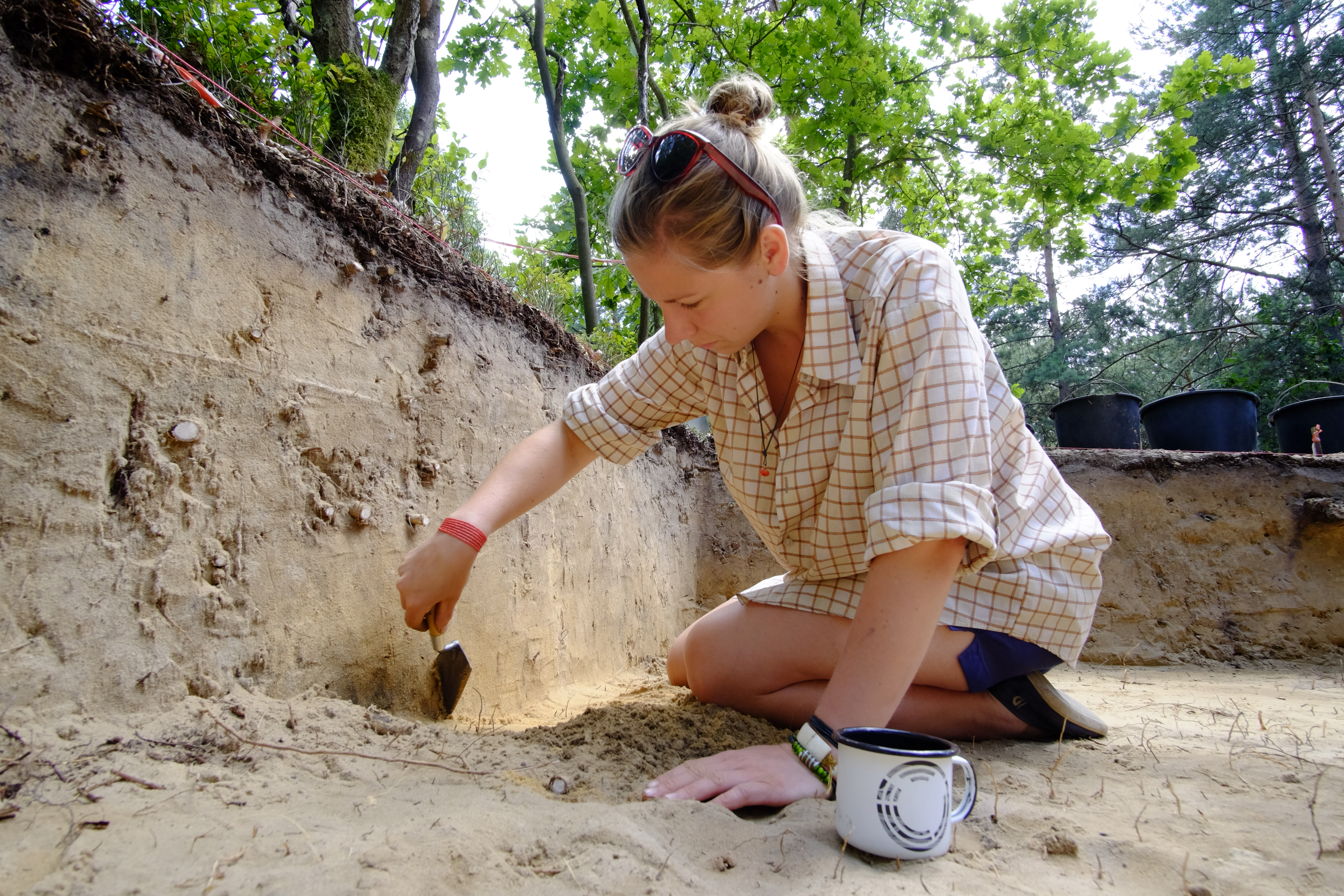

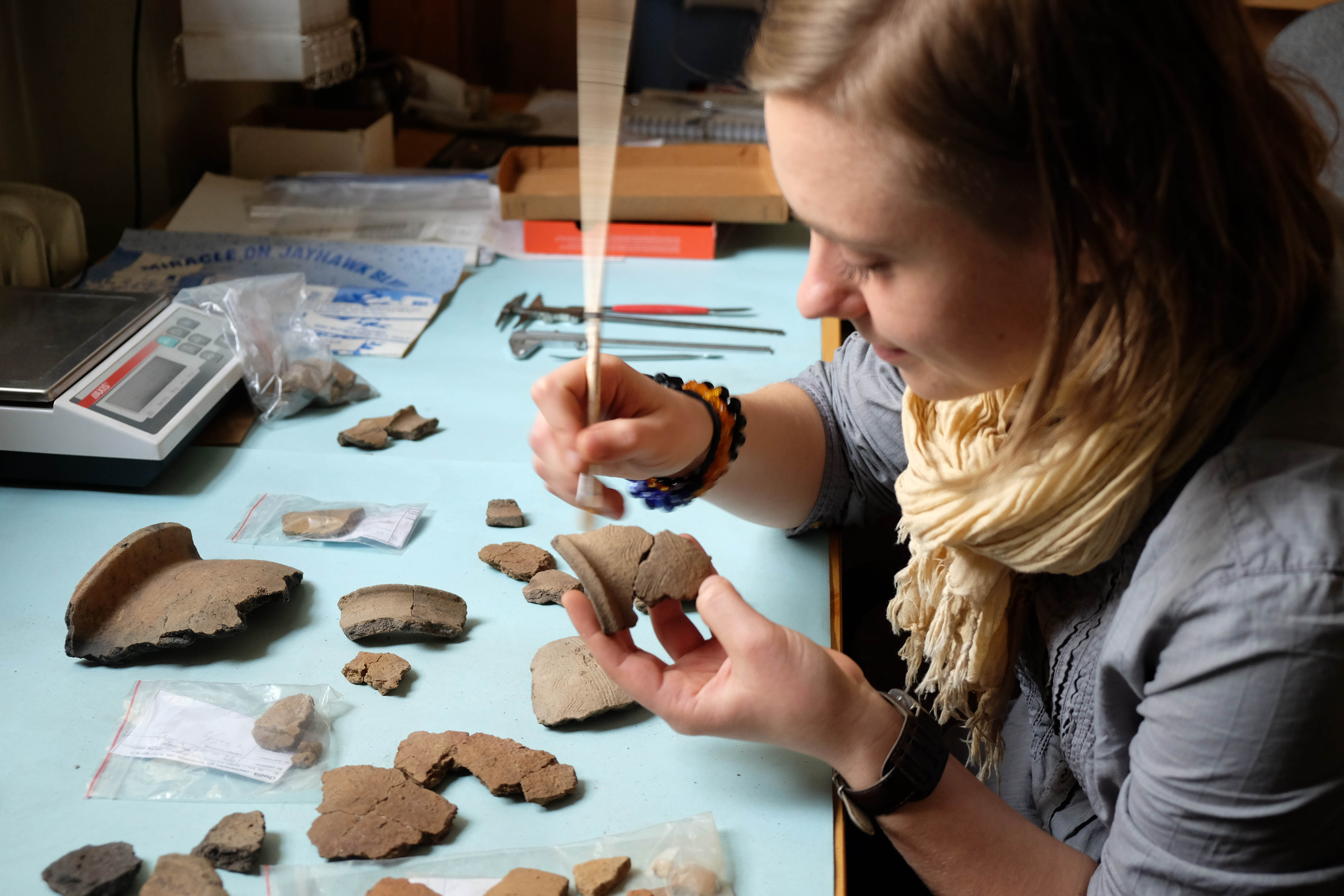

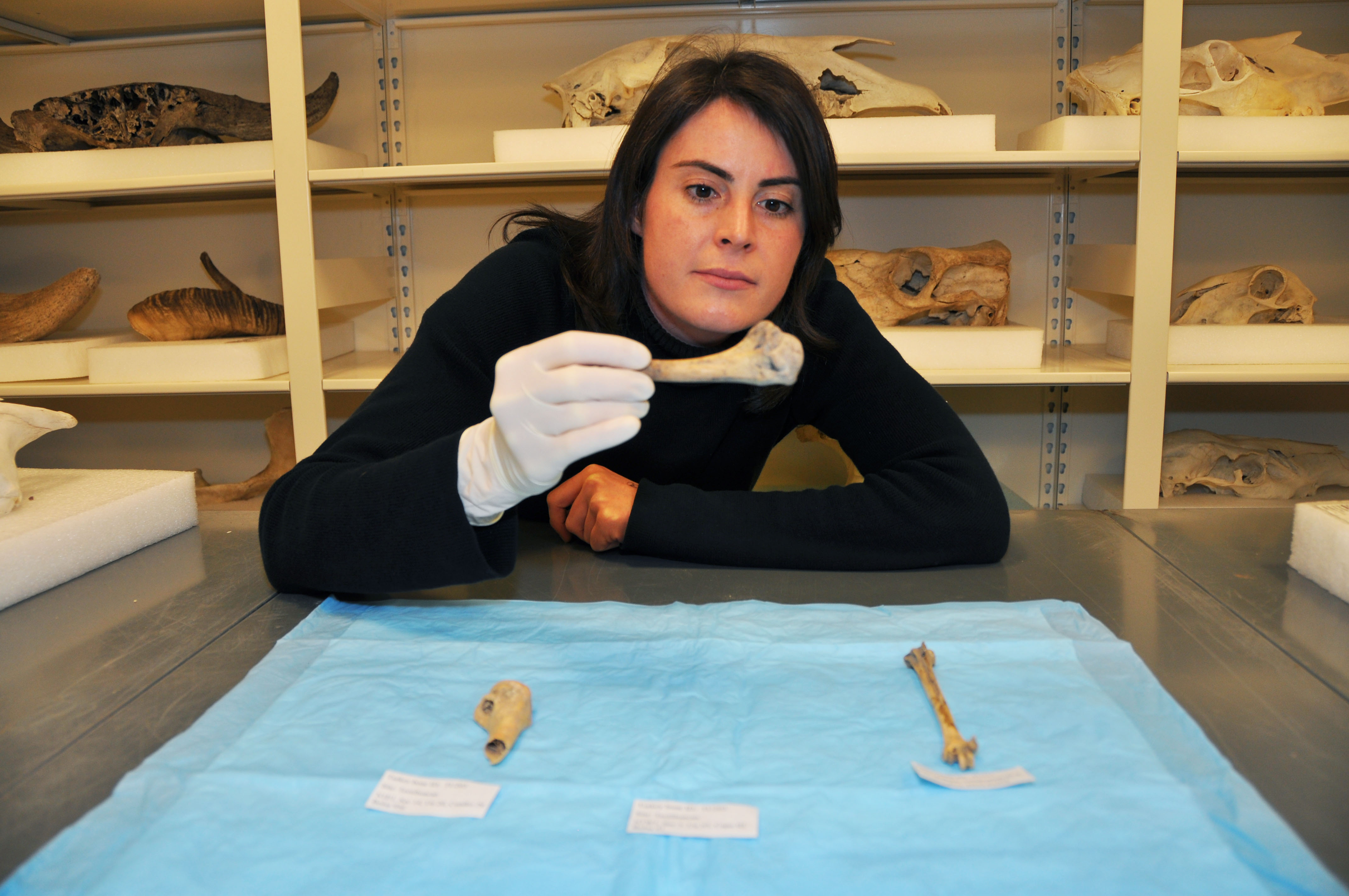

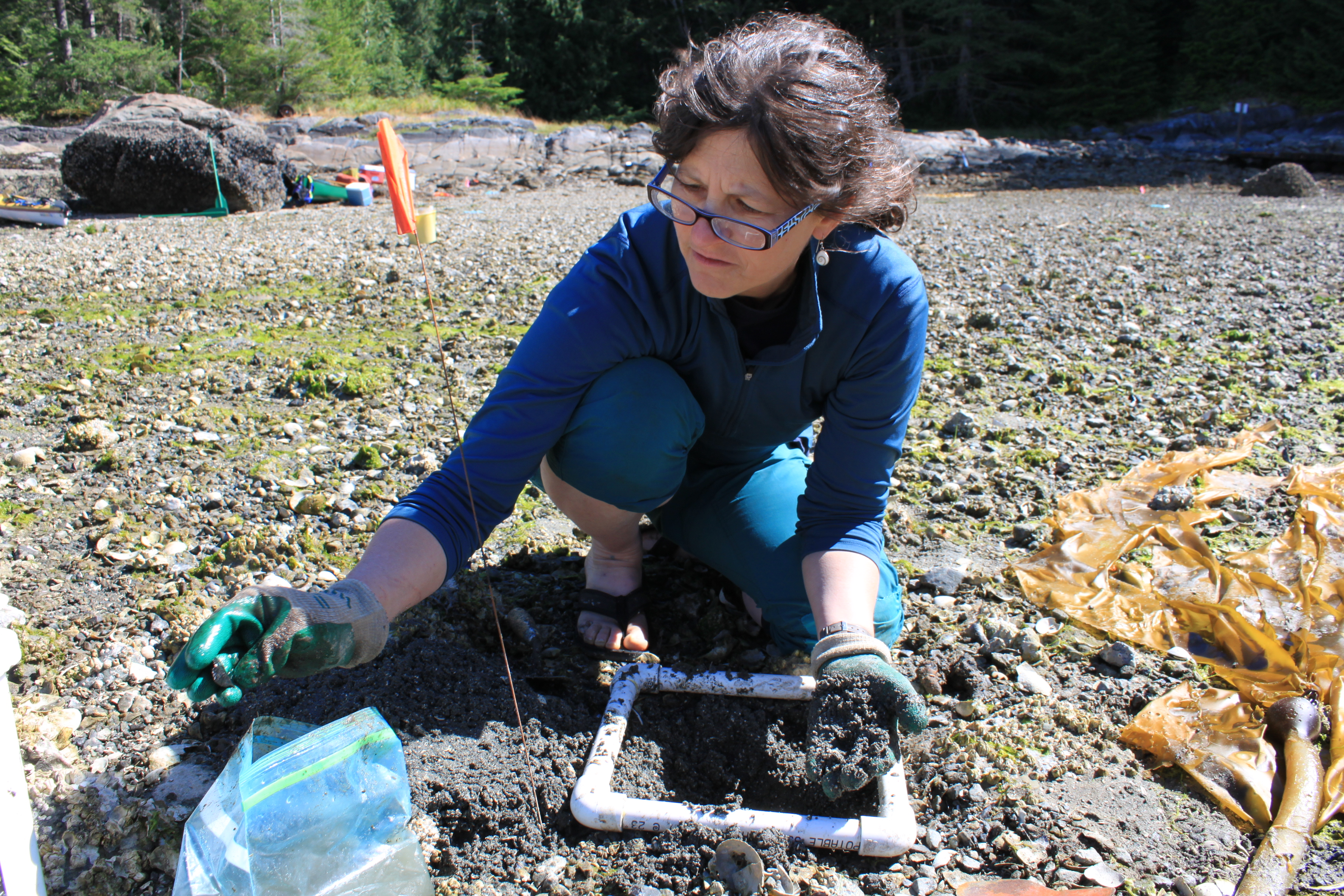

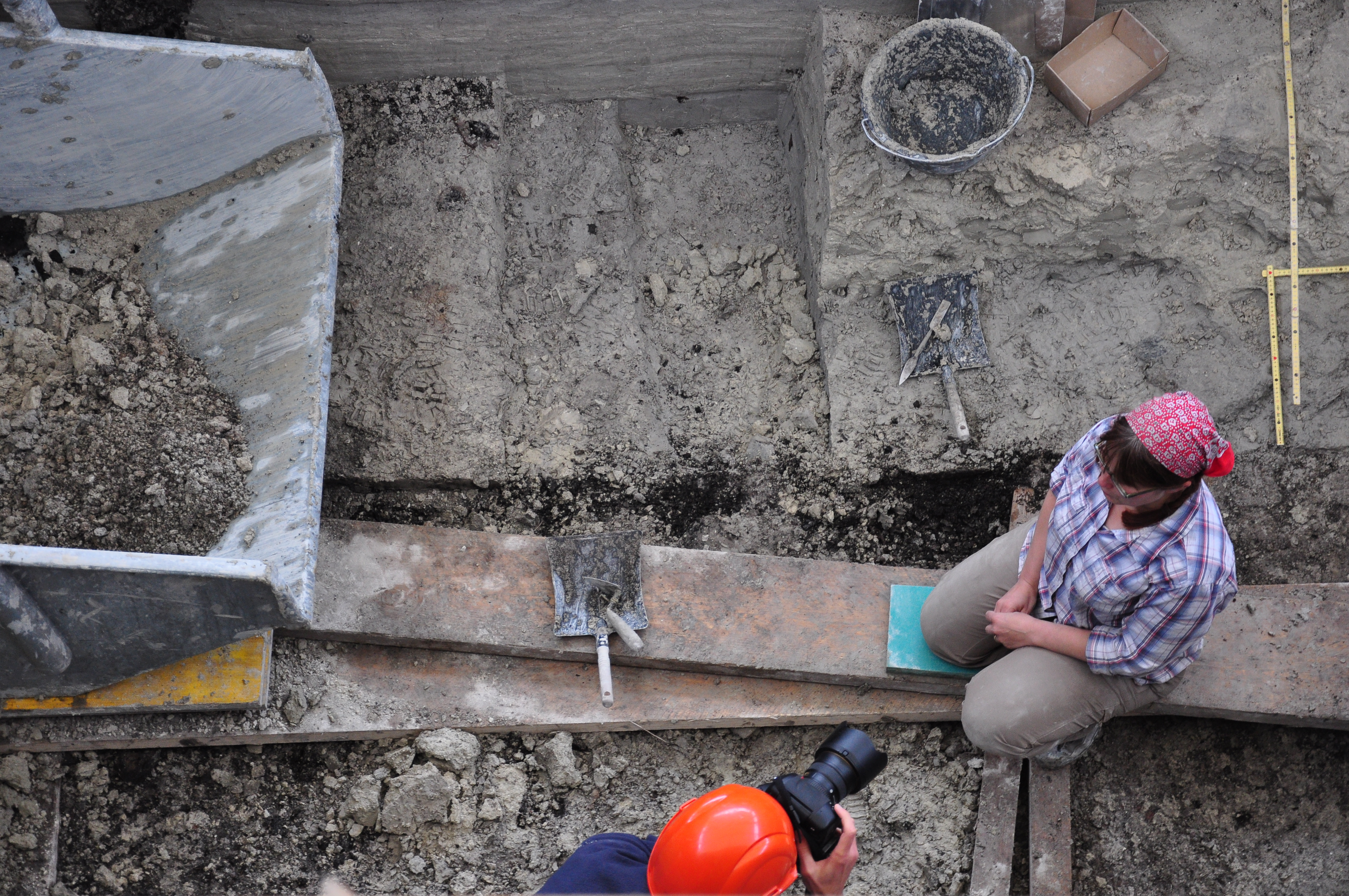

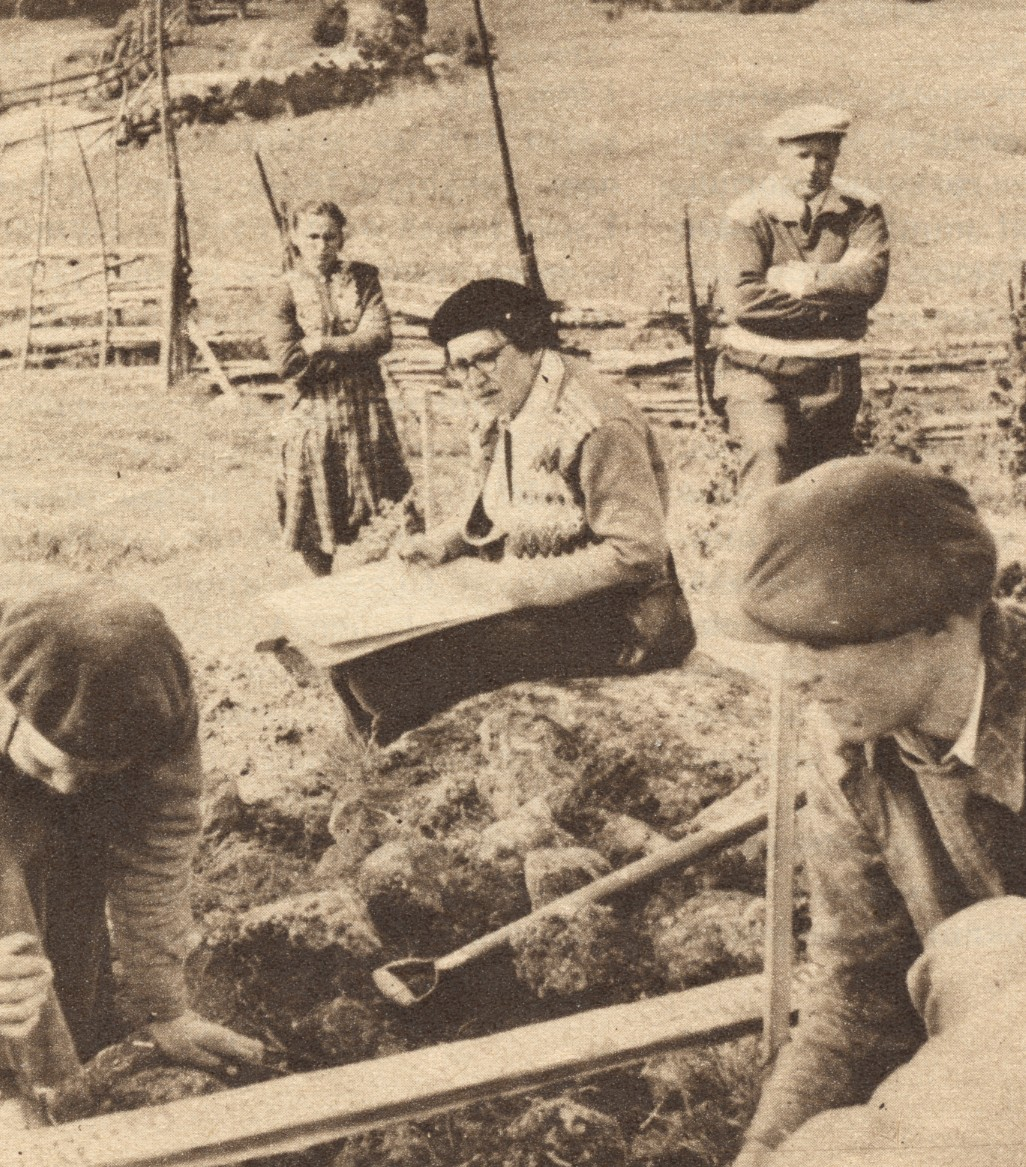

== See also ==
- Women in science
- Feminist archaeology
- Gender archaeology
