= Riefstahl =

Riefstahl is a surname. Notable people with the surname include:

- Cornelia Oschkenat (née Riefstahl; born 1961), German track and field athlete
- Elizabeth Titzel Riefstahl (1889–1986), American anthropologist and archaeologist
- Rudolf Meyer Riefstahl (1880–1936), German art historian and specialist in Islamic art
