= Mínguez =

Mínguez is a Spanish surname. Notable people with the surname include:

- Carlos Martínez Mínguez (born 1973), Spanish politician
- Concepción Blanco Mínguez (1907–1994), Spanish archaeologist
- Elvira Mínguez (born 1965), Spanish actress
- Leopoldo Alas Mínguez (1962–2008), Spanish writer, poet, and editor
- Miguel Mínguez (born 1988), Spanish cyclist
