= Blanche Wheeler Williams =

Archeologist and teacher

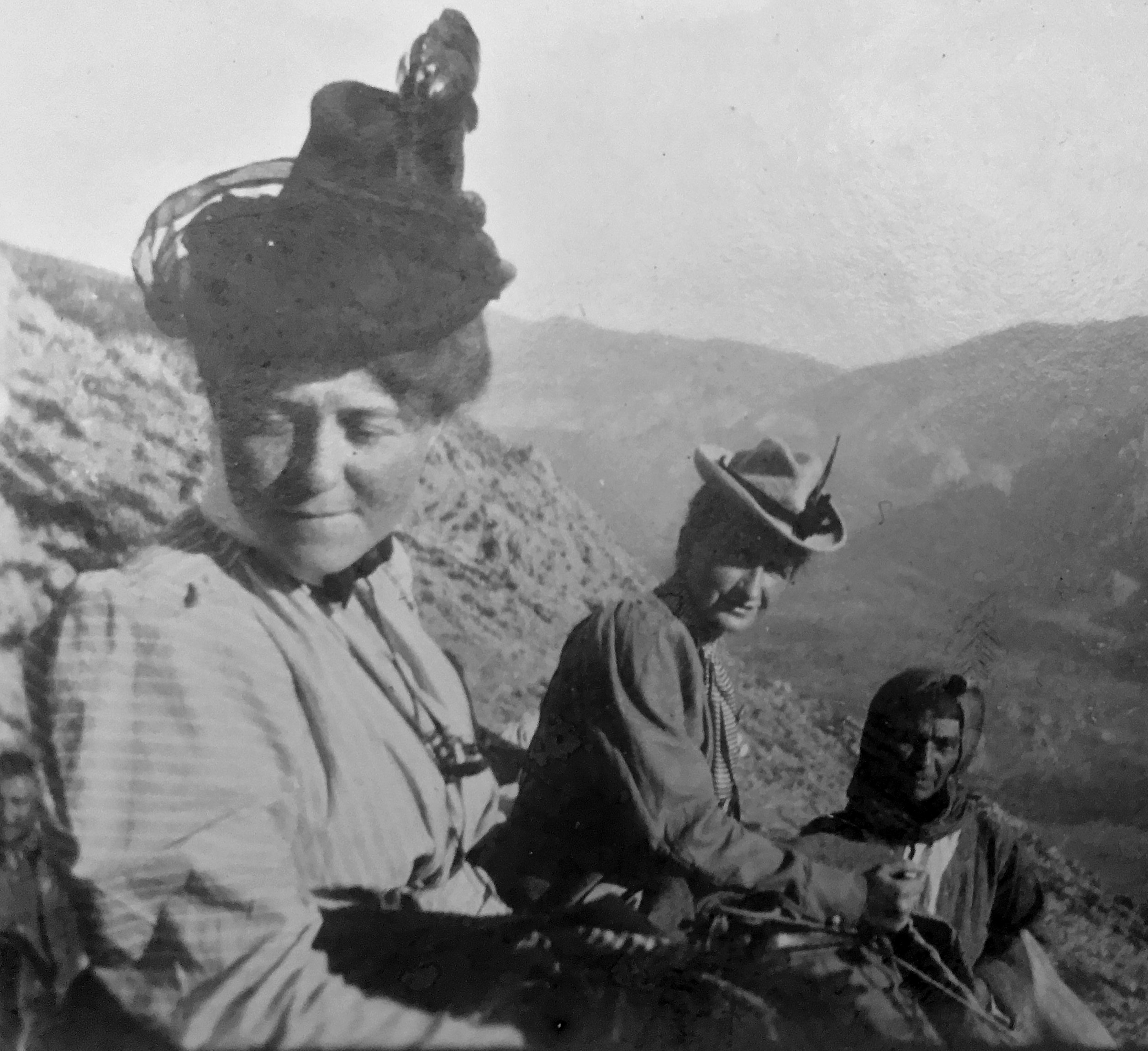
- Williams (left) traveling up Parnassus from Delphi, c. 1900
- Born: January 9, 1870; Concord, Massachusetts
- Died: December 9, 1936 (aged 66); Cambridge, Massachusetts
- Education: Smith College
- Occupation: Archaeologist
- Known for: Discoveries in Isthmus of Hierapetra and at Gournia

Blanche Wheeler Williams (January 9, 1870 – December 9, 1936) was an archaeologist and teacher best known for her work in the Isthmus of Hierapetra and her discoveries at Gournia with colleague Harriet Boyd Hawes. She was trained at Smith College and worked as a teacher at her aunt's preparatory school until her Cretan archaeological digs in 1900 and 1901. Williams was married in 1904 and did not return to the field after contributing to a 1908 publication, though she wrote a biography of her aunt and helped with her husband's travel book.

== Early life ==
Williams was born Blanche Emily Wheeler on January 9, 1870 in Concord, Massachusetts. Her ancestors include Plymouth Colony Pilgrims and early New England colonists. She was closely connected with her grandmother in her youth, who introduced Williams to prominent intellectuals including Ralph Waldo Emerson, Henry David Thoreau, and Amos Bronson Alcott. Williams graduated from Smith College in 1892, where she studied ancient art, archaeology, Greek, Latin, drawing, and painting. She befriended Harriet Boyd there, who became a close friend and colleague in archaeology.

== Career ==
Williams taught Latin, Greek, and English for the next decade at her aunt's preparatory Wheeler School in Providence, Rhode Island. She conducted tours of Europe with her students and took multiple sabbaticals. Between 1898 and 1899, she traveled through Greece and Italy with Boyd and a fellow Smith alumnus.

The next year, Boyd's discovery of an undisturbed Bronze Age beehive tomb in Kavousi, Crete, and her subsequent presentation to the Archaeological Institute of America led the American Exploration Society to fund her ensuing excavations in 1901 and 1903. Williams joined Boyd's 1901 expedition, which left the Kavousi site for the eastern Avgo in search of a palace to rival those found at Knossos and Phaestos. Commensurate with their training, Boyd conducted the fieldwork in test pits and measurements while Williams drew maps and the discoveries. Their dig was delayed by spring rain and was ultimately uneventful. Following a tip from a local farmer, they began to dig at Gournia and discovered an ancient Minoan complex. Their discovery of vase fragments and bronze artifacts gave way to architecture, such as house walls and a paved road. They told the American Exploration Society about the find and their trench workforce grew from 40 to 110 workers in a week, which increased the complexity of the dig directed by Boyd. They found hundreds of artifacts and Williams illustrated their most important finds, usually vases. The event was of great significance to Williams, who would frequently write home to her students about the excavation at the forefront of archaeology. It was to be her only year of excavation, as further fieldwork was delayed for two years, when Williams was unavailable to return with Boyd. The excavation ended several years later with a total find of more than 60 houses, a central plaza, and a small palace in the town.

Williams wrote the appendix of the monograph on Gournia. Her section focuses on the importance of a nature goddess in Minoan religion. The role of female deities in Minoan Crete had been a focal point of interest in the site, and Williams wrote about a terracotta female idol found in a shrine near the top of the hill at Gournia. Williams proposed that the nature goddess and Minoan women enjoyed elevated social importance in the culture, and buttressed her claims with reference to the classicist Jane Ellen Harrison. Williams's contributions also covered stone vases and seal stones. The 1908 book was praised by the archaeology community.

Williams married Boston oriental rug importer Emile Francis Williams in 1904. Her husband also collected Chinese porcelain and was an amateur botanist. She left her job at the Wheeler School and maintained correspondence with Boyd, who continued to work in Crete. While Williams did not return to archaeology after the Gournia expedition, she later helped her husband with his French travel book and wrote a biography of her aunt, the educator. Williams died on December 9, 1936, in Cambridge, Massachusetts. She did not have children. Smith College received several dozen items from her estate after her death, mostly bronzes and porcelains from China and Korea. Some of the items had been displayed at the Fogg Art Museum and Museum of Fine Arts, Boston, and after the bequest, were put on display at Smith's art gallery in late 1937.
