= Wilhelm Meyer (philologist) =

German classical scholar (1845-1917)

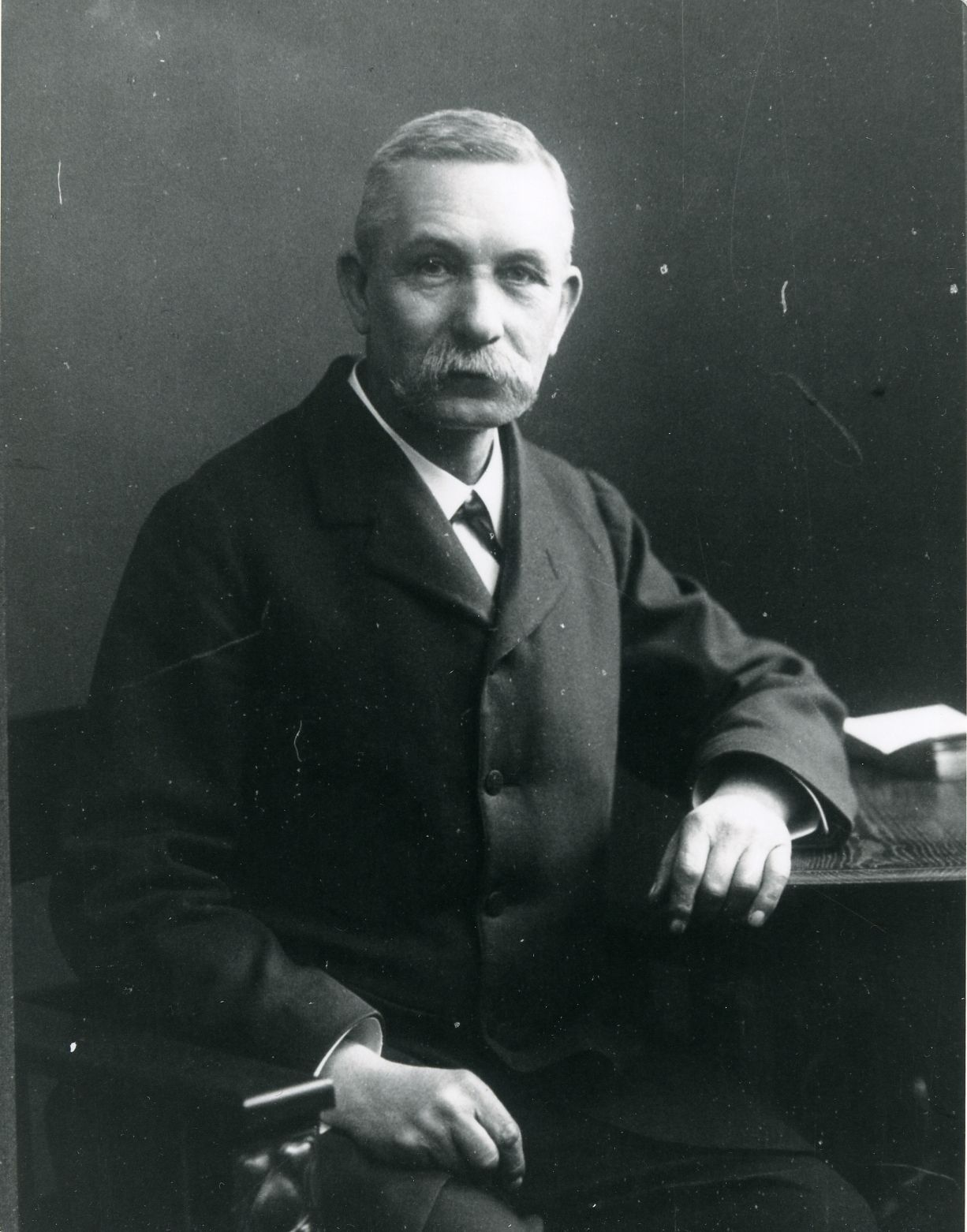
Wilhelm Meyer (philologist).

Wilhelm Meyer (1 April 1845, Speyer – 9 March 1917, Göttingen) was a German classical scholar, initially a librarian and literary scholar, who worked also on musicology. He became professor of Classical and Medieval Latin Philology at the University of Göttingen. He was known as Meyer aus Speyer (Meyer from Speyer), from his birthplace Speyer. Meyer wrote about the history of Greek and Latin hexameter poetry, famously suggesting the three Meyer rules for Hellenistic poetry (Wilhelm-Meyerschen Hexametergesetze).

He was an authority on the prosody of medieval Latin verse, publishing on it papers that were collected in three volumes of his Gesammelte Abhandlungen zur mittellateinischen Rhythmik. Die Oxforder Gedichte des Primas ... identified poems of Hugh Primas, up until then only a name. Der Gelegenheitsdichter Venantius Fortunatus (1901) worked out the chronology of the hymnodist Venantius Fortunatus.

== Family ==
His son Rudolf changed his surname, and as Rudolf (Meyer) Riefstahl is known as an archaeologist.
