= Gournia =

Archaeological site in Crete, Greece

- Γουρνιά (Greek)
- 35°06′20″N 25°47′20″E
- Type: Minoan town and "palace"
- Cultures: Minoan
- Location: Lasithi, Crete, Greece

Site notes
- Excavation dates: 1901, 1903, 1904, 1971–1972, 1976, 1992–1994, 2010–2014
- Archaeologists: Harriet Boyd Hawes, Jeffrey Soles, Costis Davaras, Vance Watrous
- Public access: Yes

Gournia (Greek: Γουρνιά) is the site of a Minoan palace complex in the Lasithi regional unit on the island of Crete, Greece. Its modern name originated from the many stone troughs that are at the site and its original name for the site is unknown. It was first permanently inhabited during the Early Minoan II periods (approximately between 2650 and 2100 B.C.E) and was occupied until the Late Minoan I period (approximately between 1700 and 1470 B.C.E.). Gournia is in a 6-mile cluster of with other Minoan archeological sites which includes Pachyammos, Vasiliki, Monasteraki, Vraika and Kavusi. The site of Pseira is close but slightly outside the cluster.

== Archaeology ==
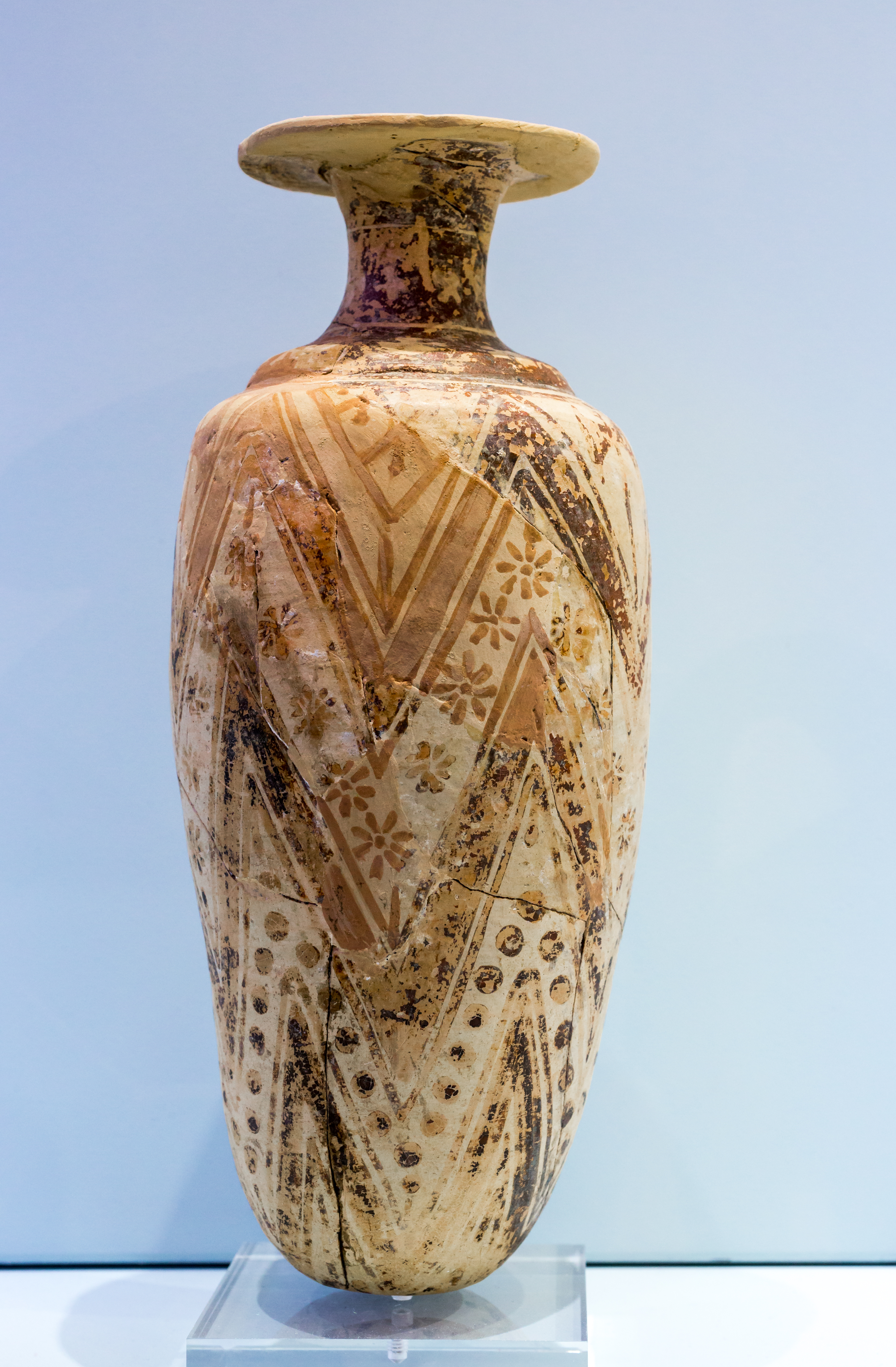
Late Minoan IB (1925-1875 B.C.E.) Rhyton found at Gournia. The ovoid Rhyton is abstract and geometrically styled.

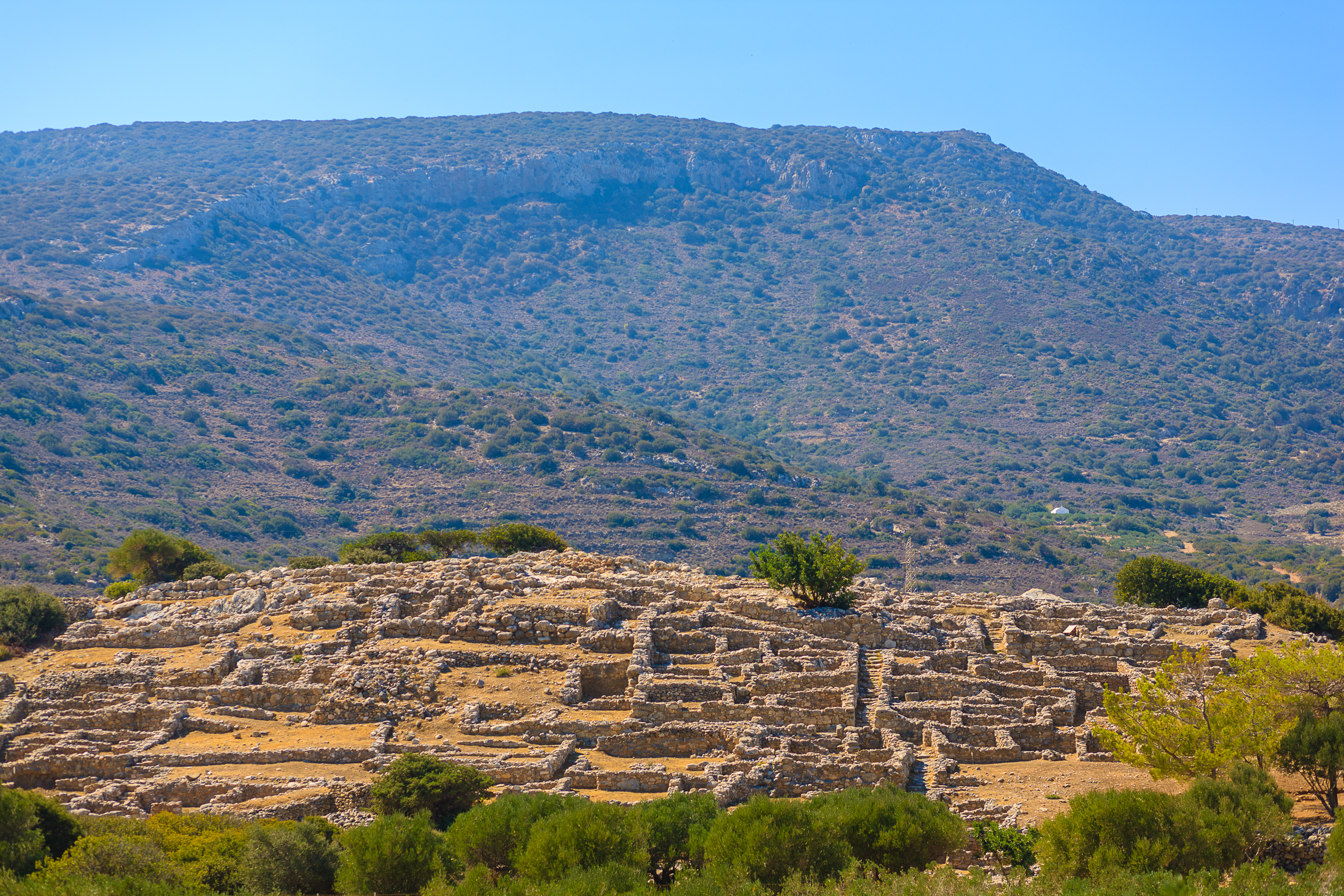
View of the ruins of Gournia from the Northeast.

Harriet Boyd Hawes first excavated the Minoan village for three field seasons in 1901, 1903 and 1904. Boyd and her team were able to expose nearly the entire town, uncovering sixty houses, the cemetery, a road system connecting everything and a central building which she called "the palace". Similar "palatial" complexes have been found throughout Crete and while recent scholarship have contested this original interpretation, the term 'palatial complex' remains the scholarly term for them despite being a misnomer. They also excavated at the site of Vasiliki which lies one mile further in on the isthmus. In 1971, 1972, and 1976 Jeffrey Soles and Costis Davaras conducted supplementary modest excavations at the site. In 1973 a lost notebook of Hawes was recovered which contained detailed descriptions and findspots of the recoveries. From 1992 until 1994 Vance Watrous conducted a survey of the site and its surrounding area. After cleaning seasons in 2008 and 2009, from 2010 until 2014 Vance Watrous excavated at the site.

Many of the archaeological finds from Gournia are held at the Heraklion Archaeological Museum and a few at the Penn Museum.

== Layout ==
The main town of Gournia is located 150 to 200 meters South of a coastal ridge which is itself located 100 meters South of the Northern Cretan coast. On this coastal ridge sits the Sphoungaras cemetery. The town itself is centered around the palatial complex which is located on the central-West side of the town. The South side of the town contains a public court while the North side contains a trench dividing the town from the Northern cemetery which lay 80 meters North of the trench between the town and the coastal ridge. Scholars D. Matthey Buell and John C. McEnroe also label other sections of the town with the letters A, B, C, D, E, F, H and I. Section E, F and I of the town lay on the North side of town but South of the North Trench. Section A, B, C and D lay on the East side of the town while Section H lays on the Southwest side.

== History ==
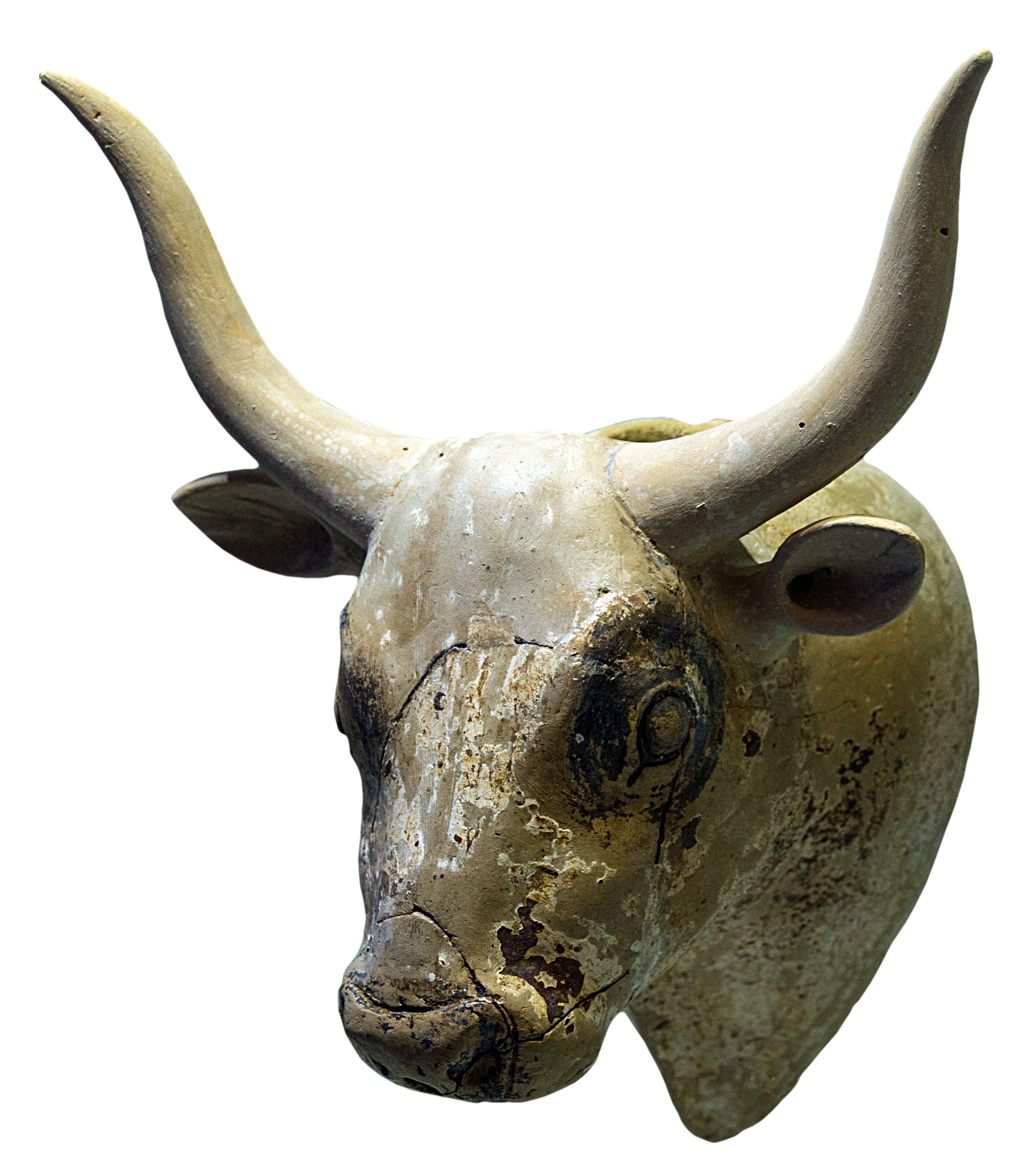
White Bull's head rhyton

Occupation at the site began early in the Early Minoan I/II periods (3100–2200 B.C.E.) and by Early Minoan II (2650–2200 B.C.E.) it had become a sizable town. In the Early Minoan II/III periods, burials began in rock shelters on the Sphoungaras ridge (with direct inhumations at Deposits A and B nearby) and on the north ridge (rock shelters V and VI and one built tomb, House Tomb III, which continued in use until the Middle Minoan IA period). In the Middle Minoan IA period (2100–1925 B.C.E.) five additional House Tombs were built (I, II, IV, VII, and VIII).

During the Middle Minoan IB period (1925–1875 B.C.E.) substantial construction began which was later destroyed in the Middle Minoan II period (1875–1700 B.C.E.). Rebuilding occurred in the Middle Minoan III period, which included the palace complex. The site reached its largest extent sometime between the Middle Minoan III and Late Minoan II periods (between 1750 and 1470 B.C.E.). It site covered an area of about 1.68 hectares and included about 64 houses, the palace complex and a 500 square meter town square. It had a cobblestone street system of over one half kilometer in length. This occupation was destroyed in the Late Minoan period IB (1625–1470 B.C.E). As at other Minoan sites all the Linear A tablets were found in that final layer. A Linear A roundel (sealing) from the LM IA period was also found. Other Minoan sites including Zakros to the east and Hagia Triada to the west followed the same sequence of building and destruction. While the causes of this destruction at Gournia are unknown, at Hagia Tradia they are known to be the result of major seismic events.

The settlement was later reoccupied in the Late Minoan III period (1420–1075 B.C.E.)/Mycenae period by Mycenaeans which included the construction of a megaron.

== Cemeteries ==
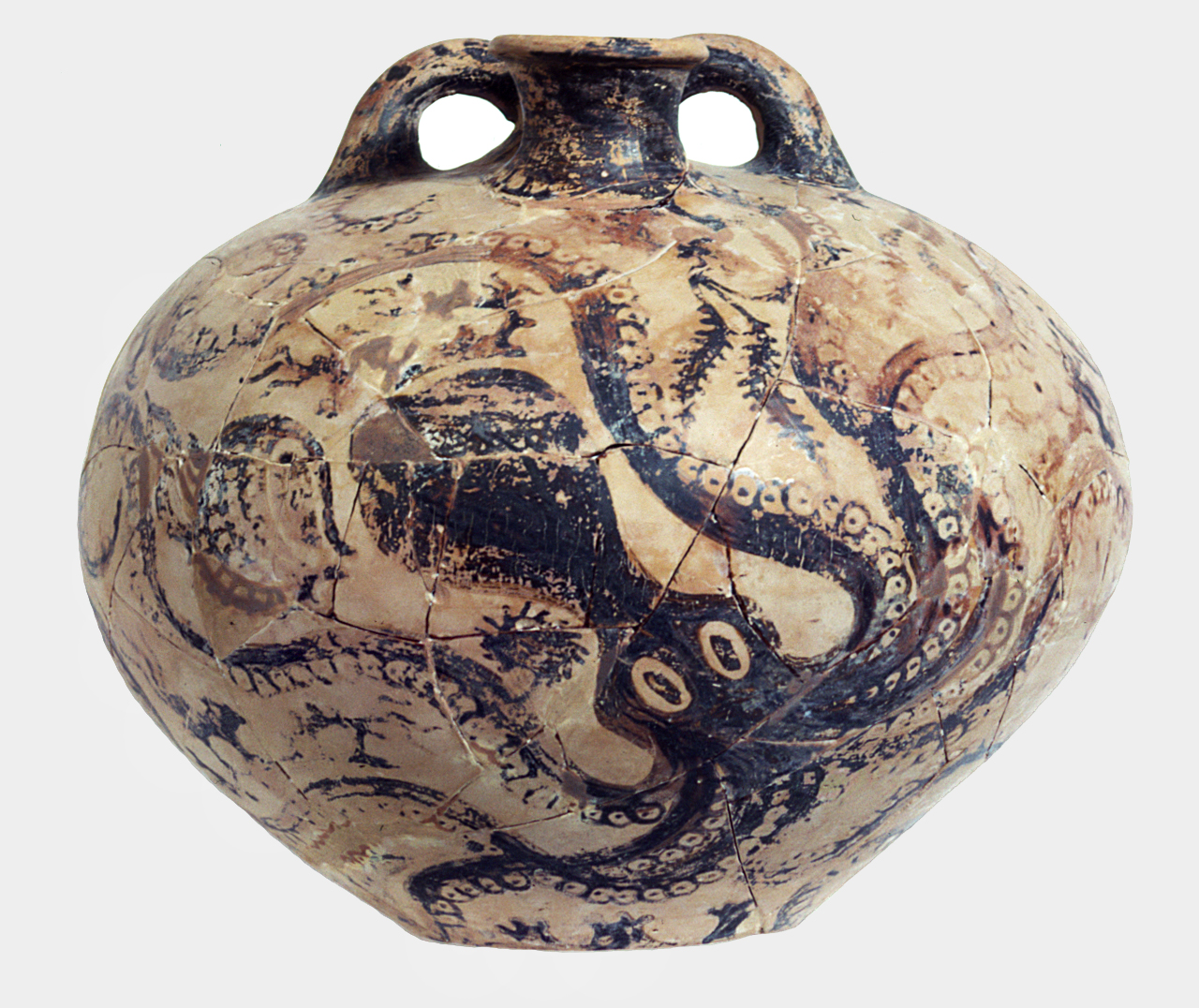
Octopus Stirrup Jar found at Gournia, now in the Heraklion museum.

=== Sphoungaras cemetery ===
The Sphoungaras cemetery's natural rock shelters, openings in the rock, provided the Minoans for a suitable space to bury their dead without the need for physical labor to create or build tombs. The cemetery was in continuous use for the continuous settlement of the site by the Minoans. Inhumation was the preferred mode of body disposal from early Bronze Age until the pithos burial, where the bodies were placed inside a large storage container. This method was introduced and became the norm around 1900–1800 BC. These burials were first excavated by Harriet Boyd and later revisited by Richard Seager in 1910 and by Soles and Davaras in 1970. Some of the artifacts found were various types of complete vases, jewelry, and seals made out of ivory.

=== North cemetery ===
The North cemetery was first discovered by Boyd and her team in 1901, she discovered what she described as “intramural burials,” later coining the term “house tombs” to refer to them. Unlike the cemetery in Sphoungaras, people were buried in built structures here. The remains were deposited in no particular order in a charnel house manner.

=== Tomb I ===
The house tomb is a square building measuring approximately 4 meters on all its sides. It is located on the east slope of the North cemetery. It was first excavated by Boyd and revisited in 1971 by a different team of archaeologists, yielding numerous artifacts presumed to be funerary offerings. Among the findings were two small vases, a miniature jug, a mug with no handles from the Middle Minoan IA period (2100–1875 B.C.E.) found in situ; as well as a silver kantharos, two bird's nest bowls, a pair of bronze tweezers, stone vases, seals, jewelry and fragmentary sarcophagi with remains of 8 skulls and other unidentified bones.

=== Tomb II ===
Together with Tomb I, the second house tomb are the best preserved funerary structures in Gournia. Unlike Tomb I, this house tomb is rectangular and consists of two rooms; it is the only tomb that has an altar. Altars are commonly found outside of tholoi, round structures where the dead were commonly deposited, in other sites from the south of Crete. Nonetheless, both Tomb I and II would have appeared like normal houses to outsiders without the presence of the shrine due to the use of the same construction techniques and architectural style applied to build the town's structures.

Some of the artifacts found in this house tomb were stone seals, fruitstands, three bronze tweezers, terracotta vases, cups, jugs, pithoi, and larnakes. Among these were fragmentary bones with only one salvageable skull. The accumulation and pattern of deposition of the human remains suggest that these were moved to the side once fully skeletonized to make space for more bodies.

== Gallery ==
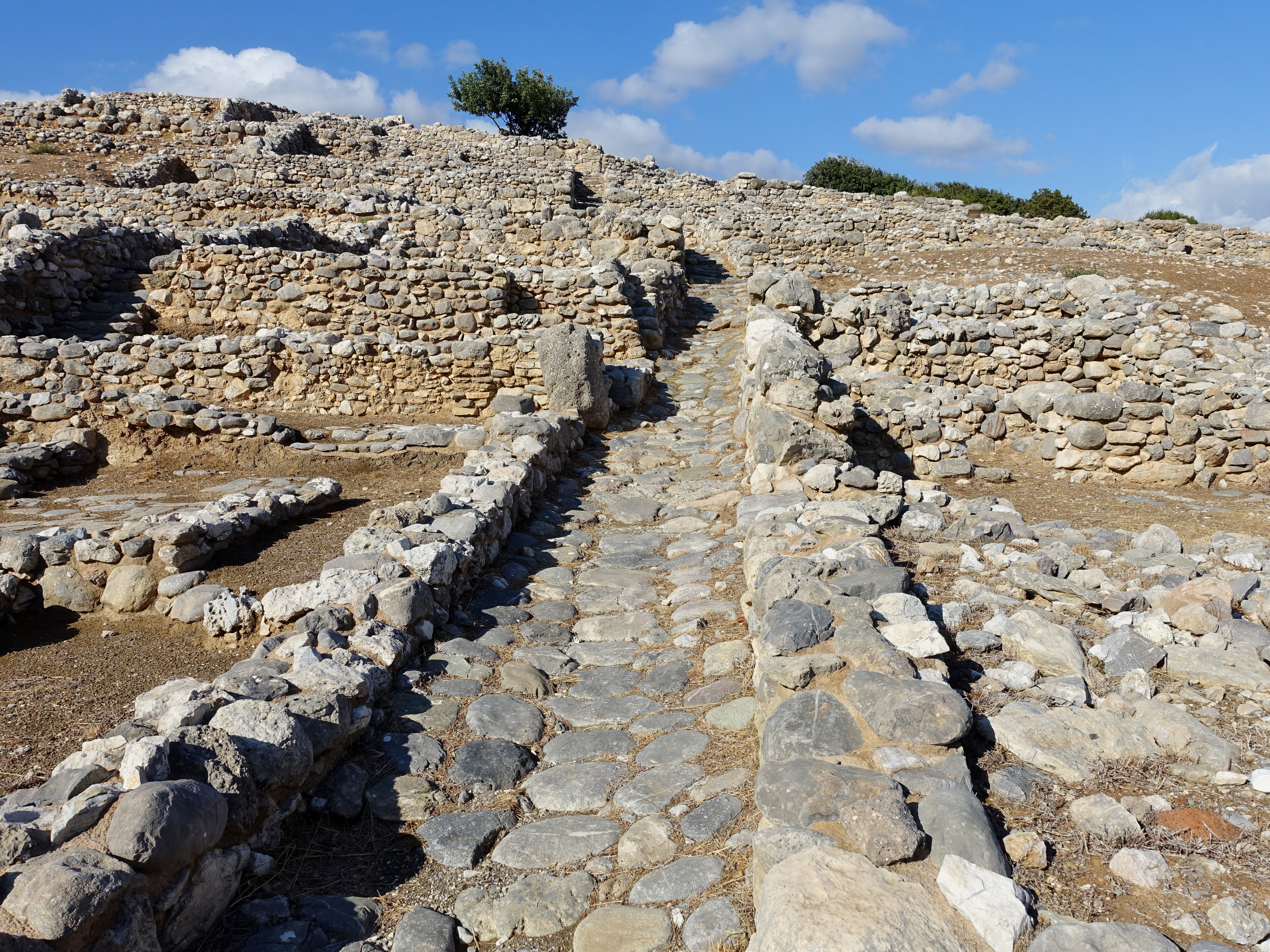
Walkway at Gournia

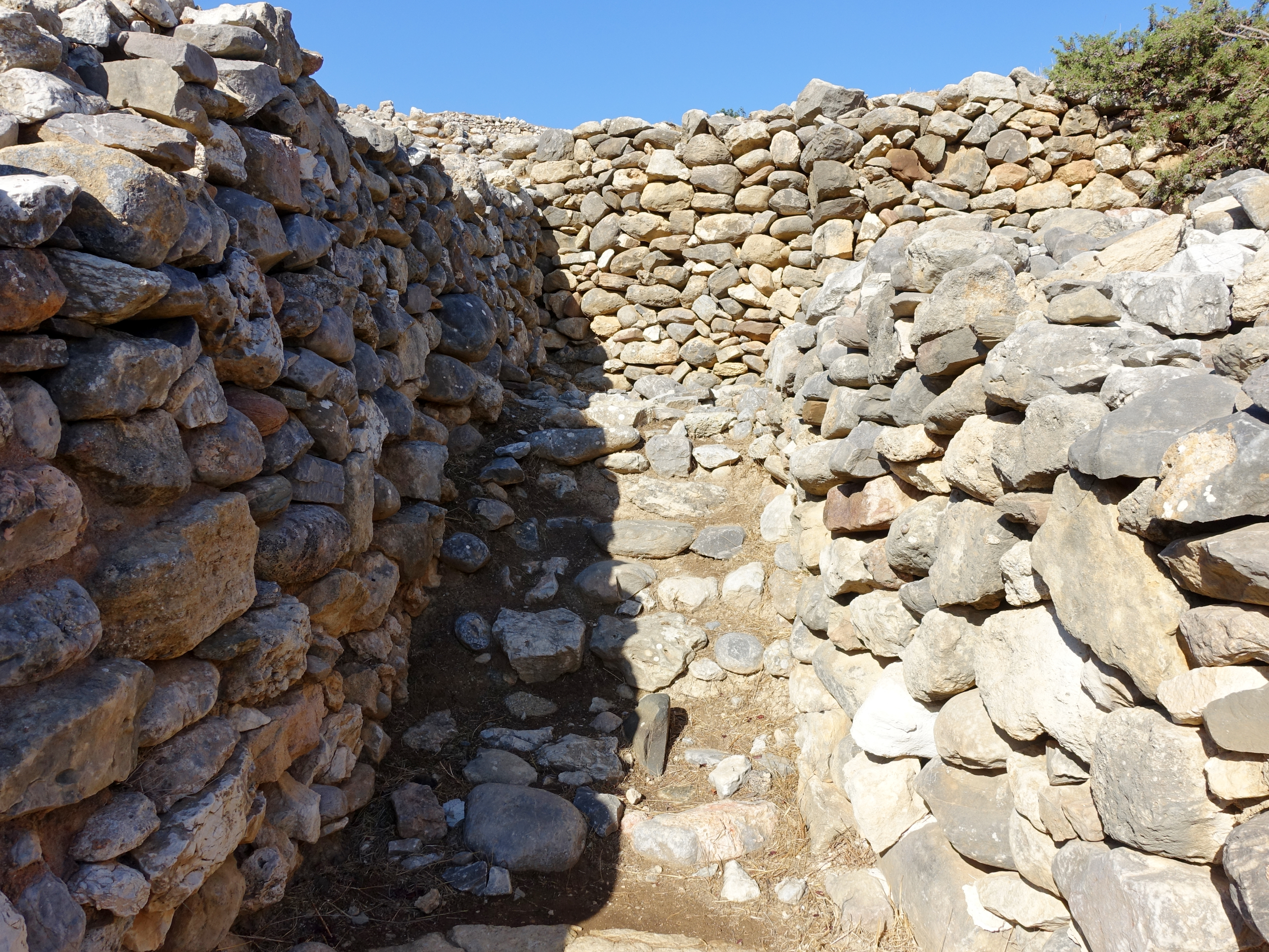
Stairs at Gournia

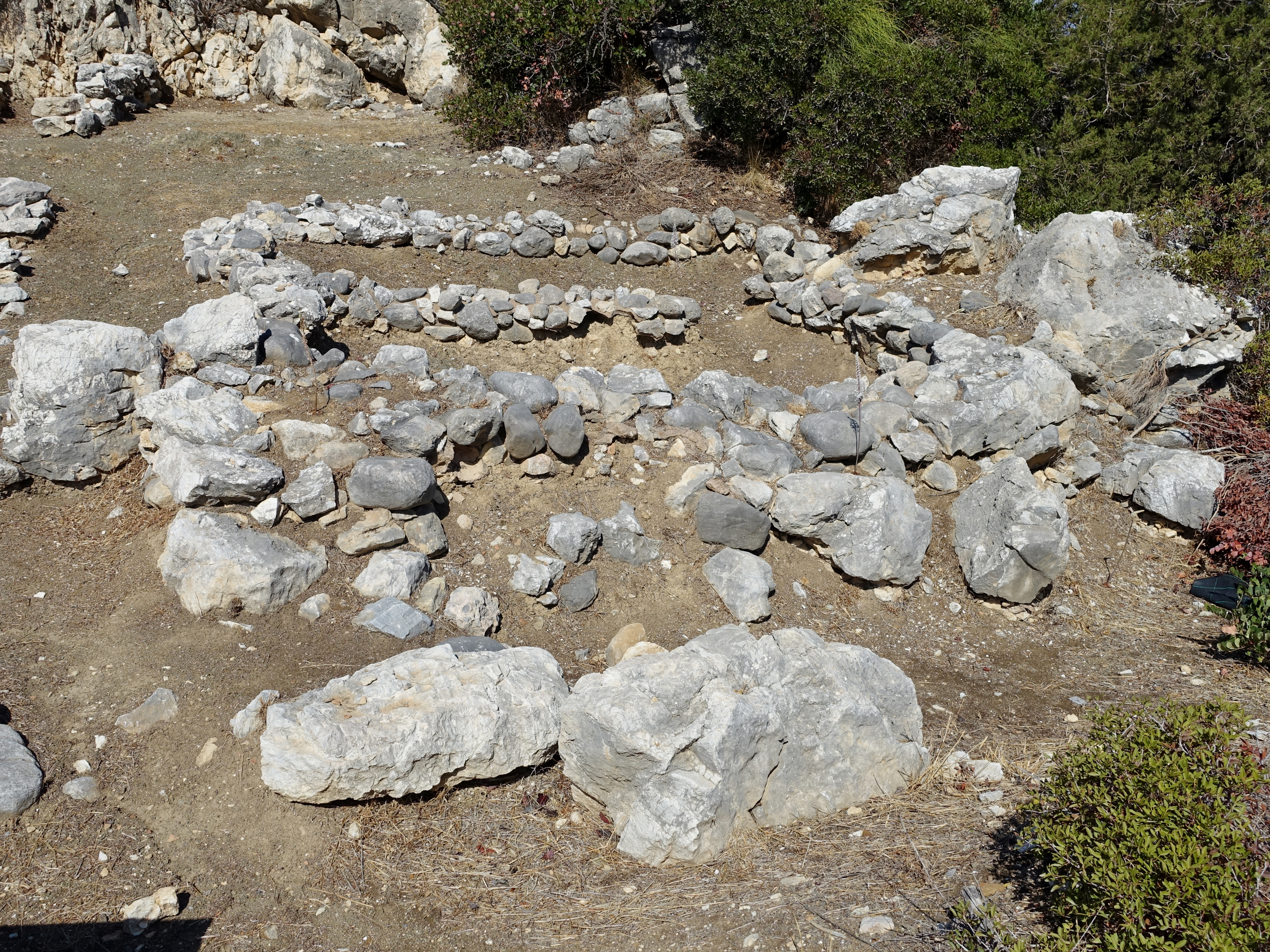
Building foundation at Gournia

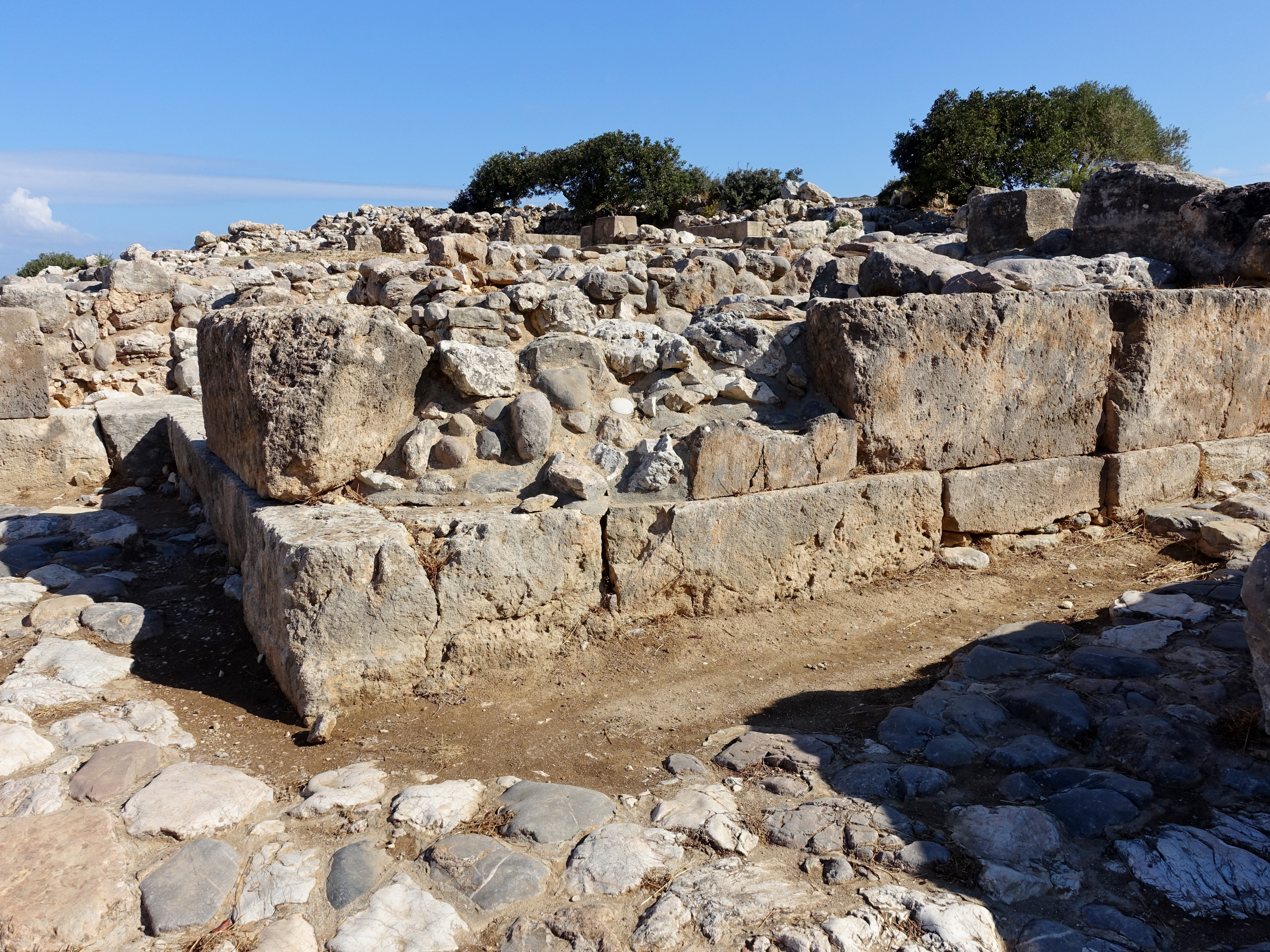
Stone Blocks at Gournia

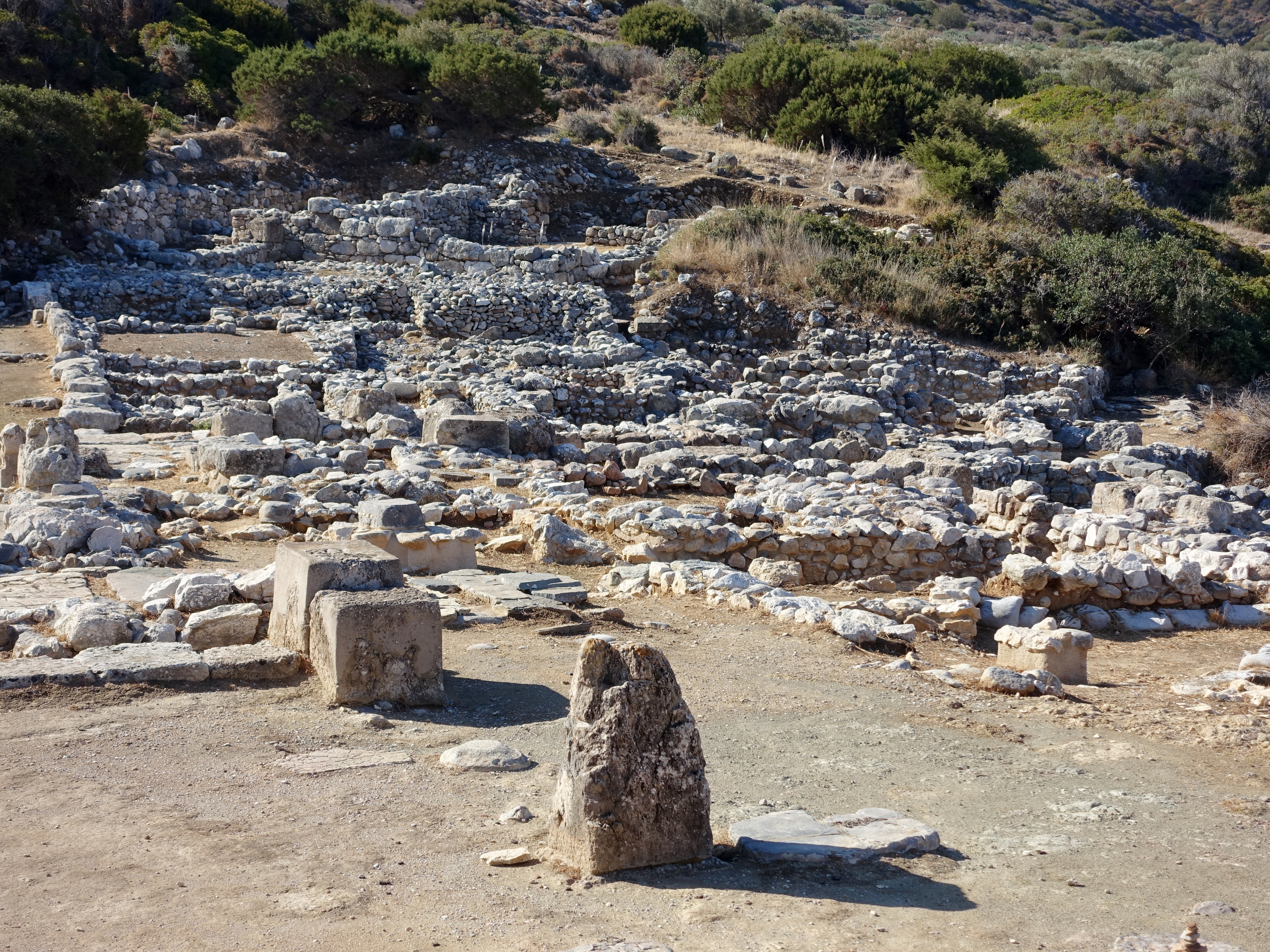
Gournia Layout

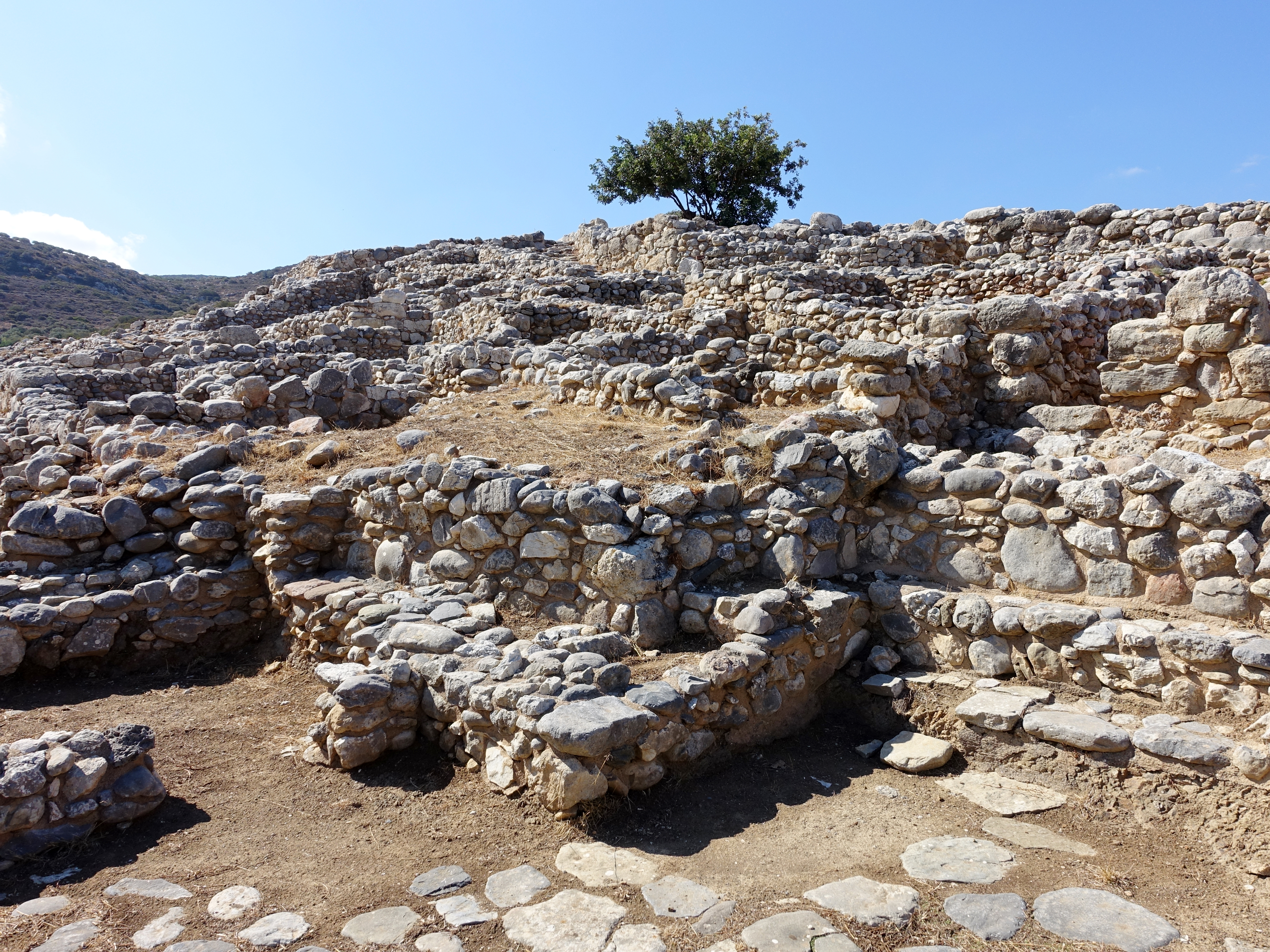
Terraced structure at Gournia

== See also ==
- Hagia Triada
- Minoan pottery
- Minoan chronology
- Minoan art
- Minoan religion
- Minoan eruption
