= Dorothy Cross Jensen =

American archaeologist

- Born: October 21, 1906; Philadelphia, Pennsylvania
- Died: February 26, 1972 (aged 65); Trenton, New Jersey
- Scientific career
- Fields: Archeology; anthropology
- Workplaces: Hunter College

Dorothy Cross Jensen (October 21, 1906 – February 26, 1972) was an American anthropologist, archaeologist, and public educator. Her research transformed both the fields of Middle Eastern archaeology and New Jersey prehistory.

In 1936, she earned her Ph.D. from the University of Pennsylvania in Oriental Studies and Anthropology. She served as an assistant curator at the University of Pennsylvania Museum, contributing to the Tell Billa and Tepe Gawra excavations in Iraq under Professor Ephraim A Speiser. Using this research, she published The Pottery of Tepe Gawra, which became a foundational document in the field of Middle Eastern ceramics. Her dissertation Moveable Property in Nuzi Documents is described as a "classic" in her field.

Committed to public education, Cross served as State Archaeologist for the New Jersey State Museum, in which she was involved for 43 years. She was also a professor at Hunter College, where she served as a Divisional Chairman of the Department of Anthropology.

== Early life and education ==
Dorothy Cross was born in 1906 in Philadelphia, Pennsylvania, the daughter of Herbert Cross, an emigrant from Ramsbottom, England; and Marie MacCaughey, of Irish descent. She earned her undergraduate degree from the University of Pennsylvania in 1928. Cross married Paul Jensen, who died in 1957.

In 1936, she earned her Ph.D. from the University of Pennsylvania in Oriental Studies (the precursor to what is now the Department of Near Eastern Languages and Civilizations) and Anthropology. Initially, her professional focus was in the field of Middle Eastern Archaeology. Her dissertation, Moveable Property in the Nuzi Documents, was described as a "classic" in her field. Cross's research was based on an analysis of the transactions of two well-off families in the region in second millennium B.C. Through translating family records, business transactions, and court proceedings on cuneiform tablets, Cross was able to examine measuring systems as well as the different values of various goods during the time. Specifically, Cross examined the relative values of produce, clothing, metals, and metrology, among others.

Cross published all of her professional works under her maiden name of Cross but was later known at Hunter College as Professor Jensen.

== Influence in field of Middle Eastern archaeology ==
In addition to publishing her dissertation, Cross also contributed to the field of Middle Eastern archaeology throughout her time in graduate school and after receiving her Ph.D. From 1930 to 1938, Cross served as assistant curator at the University of Pennsylvania Museum. Cross also served as registrar on the Tell Billa and Tepe Gawra excavations in Iraq under Professor Ephraim A. Speiser.

Based on this research, Cross published The Pottery of Tepe Gawra, which detailed the changes in pottery with regards to shape, decoration, and wares. Cross' chapter became a model for later studies of Middle Eastern pottery, as Cross pioneered the first research on the subject.

== Influence in field of New Jersey anthropology and prehistory ==
After returning to the United States, Cross changed the focus of her research to New Jersey prehistory, specifically with regards to the Indians of the Delaware Valley. Cross initially became involved with the New Jersey State Museum, where she spearheaded public education efforts such as the publication of leaflets and lay articles about New Jersey's history. In 1936, Cross was appointed as supervisor of the Indian Site Survey of New Jersey, a Works Project Administration project that was part of the New Deal. This project consisted of retelling New Jersey's history, and Cross was in charge of the project's budget of $250,000.

Using the data from this project, Cross published a two-volume book entitled Archaeology of New Jersey. Volume I consisted of descriptions of sites across New Jersey and a compilation of data that resulted from previous uneven explorations. Volume II analyzed the history of the controversial historical site Abbott Farm. In this volume, Cross concluded that Paleo-Indians traversed the site but full occupation began with the Archaic period. Cross later published a 95-page work entitled "New Jersey's Indians," which was intended for a lay audience.

From 1959 to 1967, Cross was appointed supervisor of the Tocks Island Reservoir Area excavations for the National Park Service. A lifelong member of the New Jersey State Museum, Cross was involved in the museum for 43 years and was appointed to various positions, including State Archaeologist.

== Professorship and teaching ==
Cross began her teaching career at the summer school at Rutgers University. In 1929, she became a charter member of Society for Pennsylvania Archaeology, and she was made an honorary member of the Archaeological Society of New Jersey in 1937.

By 1939, she simultaneously was an archaeologist for the New Jersey State Museum as well as an instructor at Hunter College. Due to lack of funds, Cross taught a variety of courses at Hunter College, where she was known as Professor Jensen. From 1950 to 1957, Cross served as Divisional Chairwoman of the Department of Anthropology, and after 28 years of teaching became a full professor. She had a reputation for being honest and inquisitive among her students at Hunter. From 1940 to 1960, Cross also served as Program Chairwoman of the Eastern States Archaeological Federation.

== Final years and death ==
Cross never retired, though she had a host of health issues including low blood pressure and emphysema. She spent her final years in frustration as the New Jersey State Museum shifted its focus to modern art, leaving behind much of her work on the natural history of New Jersey. Cross died at age 65 of pneumonia in 1972.

== Additional awards and recognition ==
- 1938-39: Recording Secretary for Eastern States Archaeological Federation
- 1940-60 Program Chairwoman of Eastern States Archaeological Federation
- 1942: Assistant Editor for the Archaeological Society of New Jersey and Eastern States Archaeological Federation
- 1945: Local and Program Chairwoman for Section H of American Association for the Advancement of Science
- 1952: Local Chairwoman for the meeting of the American Association of Physical Anthropologists in New York
- 1950s: Co-chairman for Anthropology at the New York Academy of Sciences
- 1966-68: Member of executive board and Secretary of Archaeological Society of New Jersey
