= Avgo =

Greek islet in the Aegean Sea

Native name: Αυγό
- Location within Greece

Geography
- Coordinates: 35.603°N 25.577°E
- Archipelago: Cretan Islands

Administration
- Greece
- Region: Crete
- Regional unit: Lasithi

Demographics
- Population: 0 (2001)

Avgo (Greek: Αυγό, "egg"), is an uninhabited Greek islet, in the Aegean Sea, 30 km (19 mi) north of the eastern coast of Crete. Administratively it lies within the Neapoli municipality of Lasithi. The islet has also been the target of naval bombardment drills, notably by the American battleship USS Iowa (BB-61) in the 1980s.

== See also ==
- List of islands of Greece
