= Revista Geográfica Española =

Geography magazine (1938–1977)

- Editor-in-chief: Manuel Hernández-Sanjuán
- Categories: Geographic magazine
- Frequency: Biannual; Annual
- Founder: Valeriano Salas-Rodríguez
- Founded: 1938
- First issue: May 1938
- Final issue: 1977
- Country: Spain
- Based in: San Sebastián; Madrid
- Language: Spanish

Revista Geográfica Española (abbreviated R Geog Esp.) was a Spanish language popular geographic magazine which was published in the period 1938–1977 in Spain. The magazine was a propaganda publication during the Franco rule.

== History and profile ==
Revista Geográfica Española was modelled on National Geographic magazine and was launched by Valeriano Salas-Rodríguez in San Sebastián in May 1938 during the Spanish civil war under the patronage of the Servido Nacional de Propaganda. Salas-Rodríguez also managed the magazine until his death in 1962 first in San Sebastián and from 1941 in Madrid. His assistant Aurelia Alonso replaced him as the manager of the magazine and remained in the post until the final issue, numbered 63, which was published in 1977. The magazine was published irregularly. Revista Geográfica Española was biannual until 1960 although sometimes it was published every four months per year. From 1961 the magazine was published annually until its demise in 1977.

Throughout the Franco rule the magazine was financed by different state institutions such as the general directorate of cultural relations and general directorate of tourism due to its propaganda based articles. Revista Geográfica Española mostly featured articles on the visits of Rodríguez to different parts of the world, including the United States, Cuba, Italy and the Near East. The regular contributors included Federico Sardá, Manuel Hernández-Sanjuán who also served as the editor-in-chief during the Salas period and Segismundo Pérez de Pedro.

The magazine introduced Spain's first touristic national roads, showcasing the country's landscapes to sell them as scenic experiences.
