= Rudolf Meyer Riefstahl =

German art historian (1880–1936)

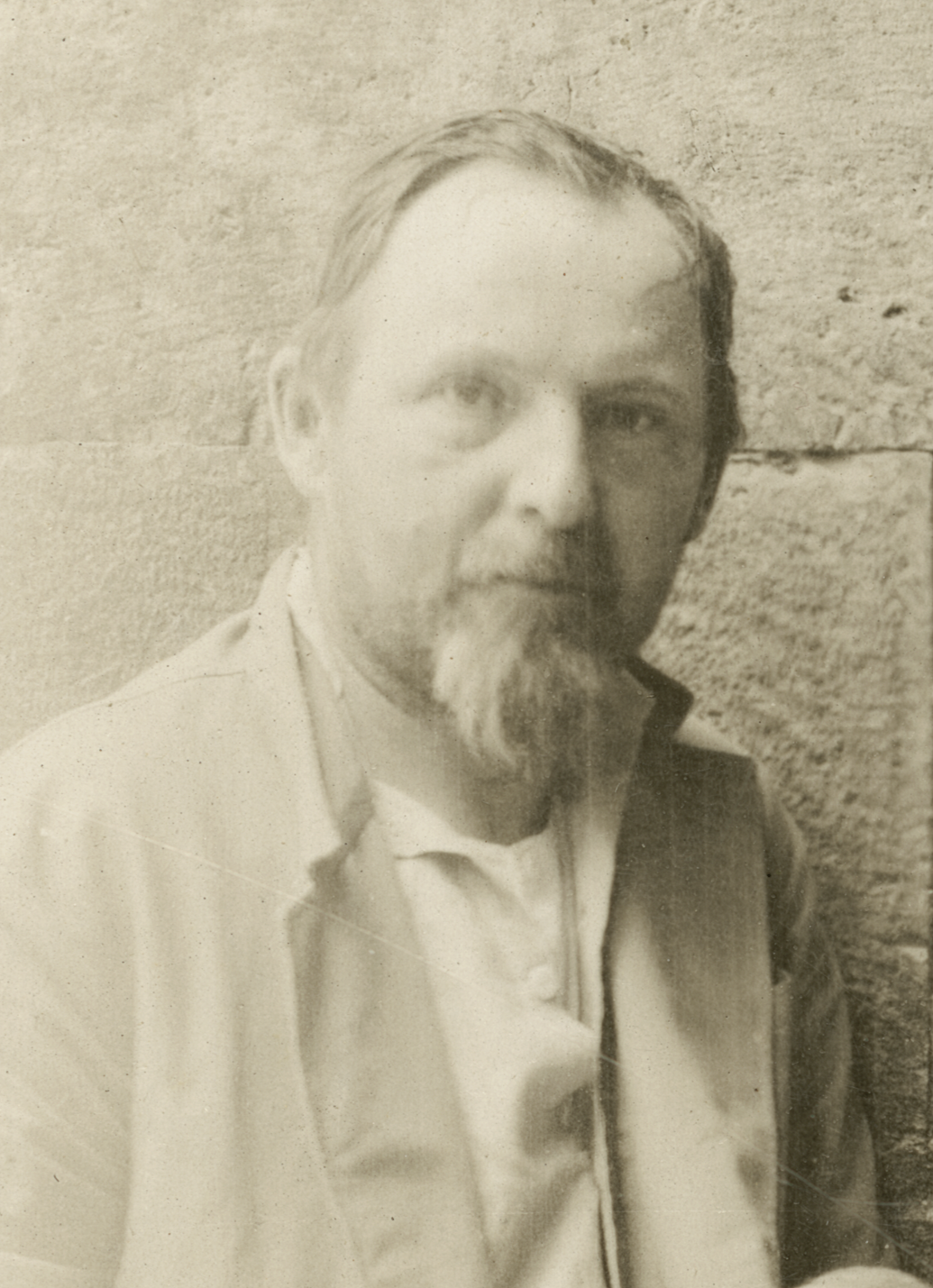
- Born: 9 August 1880; Munich
- Died: 31 December 1936
- Education: University of Göttingen, University of Strasbourg
- Occupation: Medievalist
- Awards: Guggenheim Fellowship (1934)
- Scientific career
- Fields: Cultural history
- Workplaces: University of California; New York University

Rudolf Meyer Riefstahl (9 August 1880 – 31 December 1936) was a German art historian and specialist in Islamic art who spent the majority of his career in America where he moved in 1915. His numerous obituaries attest to his distinguished career and the loss felt in his field of study at his sudden and early death from pneumonia.

== Early life and education ==
Born Rudolph Adalbert Meyer on 9 August 1880 in Munich to Wilhelm Meyer and Pauline Riefstahl, he later adopted his mother's maiden name. Dr Riefstahl firstly attended the University of Göttingen, where his father was professor of classical philology, and then the University of Strasbourg earning his PhD in 1904. His doctoral thesis was entitled Französische Lieder aus der Florentiner Handschift Strozzi-Magliabecchiana (French songs from the Florentine manuscript Strozzi-Magliabecchiana). Until 1910 he remained in France as a lecturer at the École normale supérieure and at the Sorbonne, Paris.

== Career ==
Riefstahl's interest in Islamic art arose following his appointment as Secretary-General of the Exposition of Muhammadan Art in Munich, in 1910. Upon his return to France, Riefstahl immersed himself in the study of Oriental art but, following the outbreak of WW1, he was forced to move and took up residence in the United States. At that time his art collection was seized by the French government as belonging to an enemy alien and sold at two auctions after the war. The sales Liquidation des biens Meyer-Riefstahl, ayant fait l'objet d'une sequestre de guerre took place in 1923 and 1925 at Hôtel Drouot, Paris.

Riefstahl lectured at the University of California in 1916 but by 1917 he had moved to New York, becoming an expert in textiles and working for the Anderson Galleries. In 1924 he was appointed Professor at New York University where he remained for the rest of his career. In the same year he married his wife Elizabeth Titzel (1889–1986), an expert in ancient Egyptian art, and together they embarked on a number of research expeditions to the Near and Middle East. Between 1927 and 1929 they lived in Istanbul (then Constantinople) where, as well as undertaking research, Riefstahl lectured at Robert College. The family then spent time in Rome, returning to New York in 1932.

Riefstahl acted as an advisor to a number of organisations, such as to the Pennsylvania Museum, Philadelphia, on the consultative committee of Ars Islamica and as a member of the council of the American Institute of Persian Art and Archaeology, amongst others.

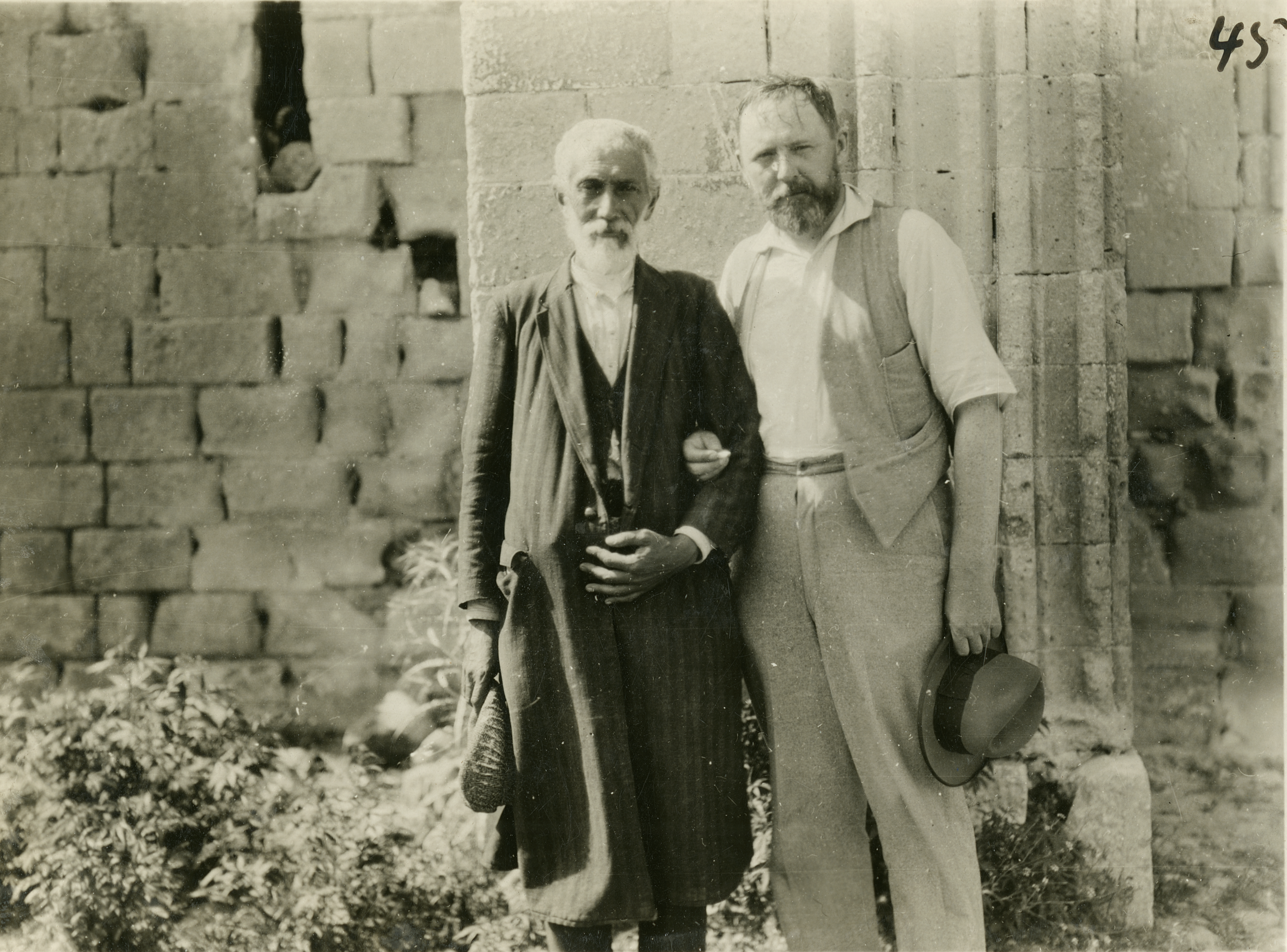
Rudolf Meyer Riefstahl with an Unidentified Man, c. 1925–1929. Department of Image Collections, National Gallery of Art Library.

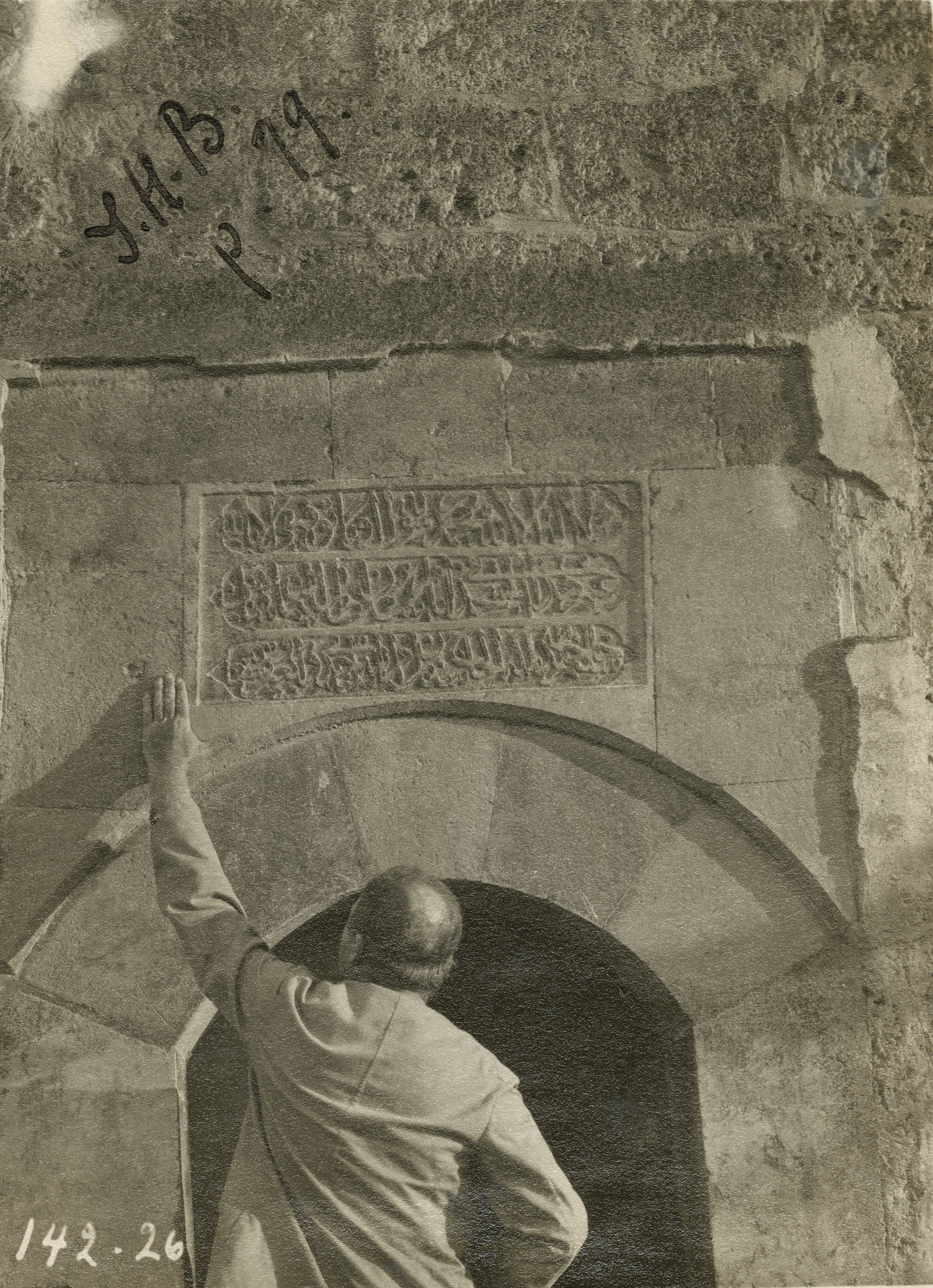
Rudolf Meyer Riefstahl, c. 1925–1929. Department of Image Collections, National Gallery of Art Library.

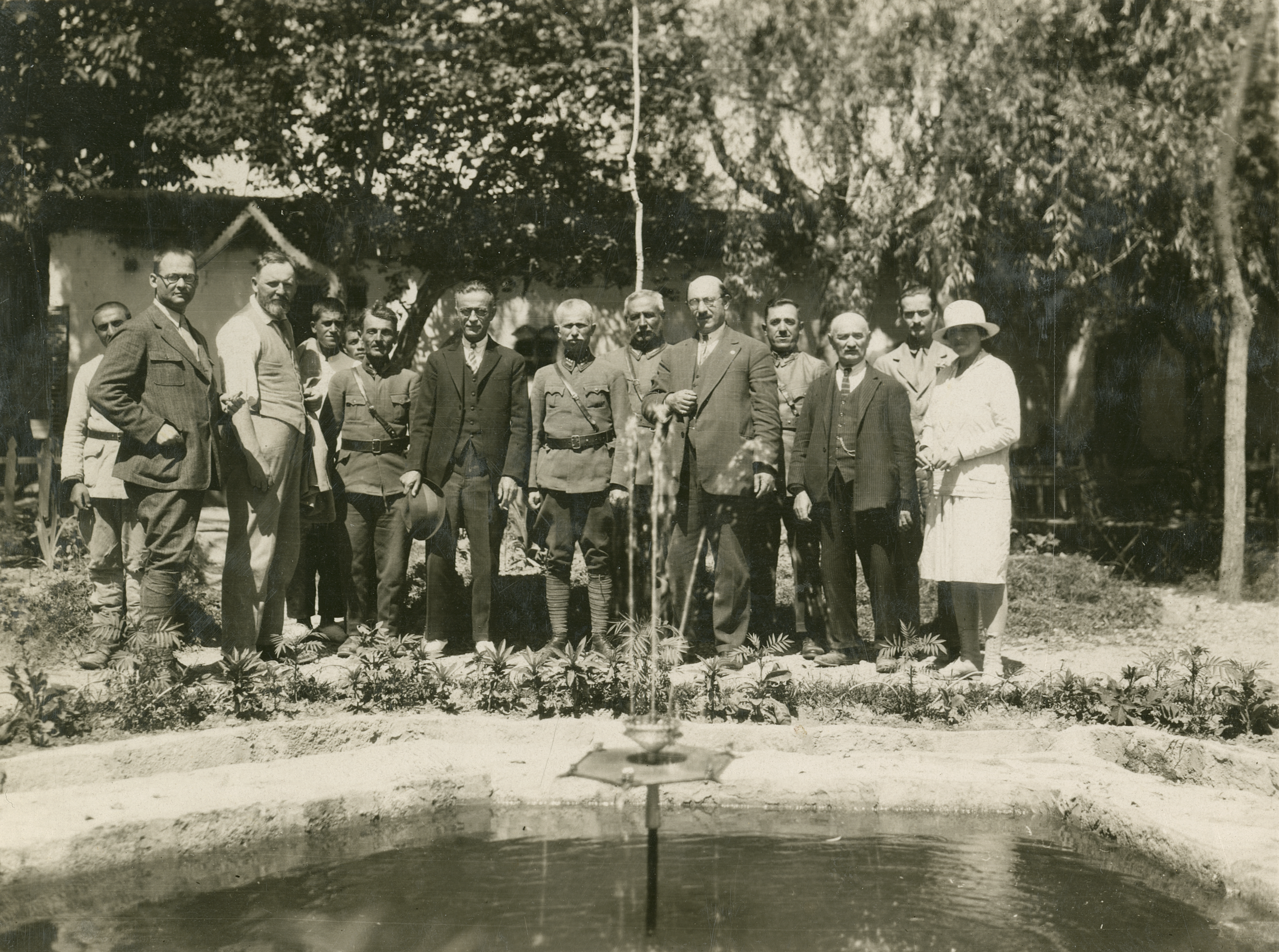
Rudolf Meyer Riefstahl and a group of Kaimakam, c. 1925–1929. Department of Image Collections, National Gallery of Art Library.

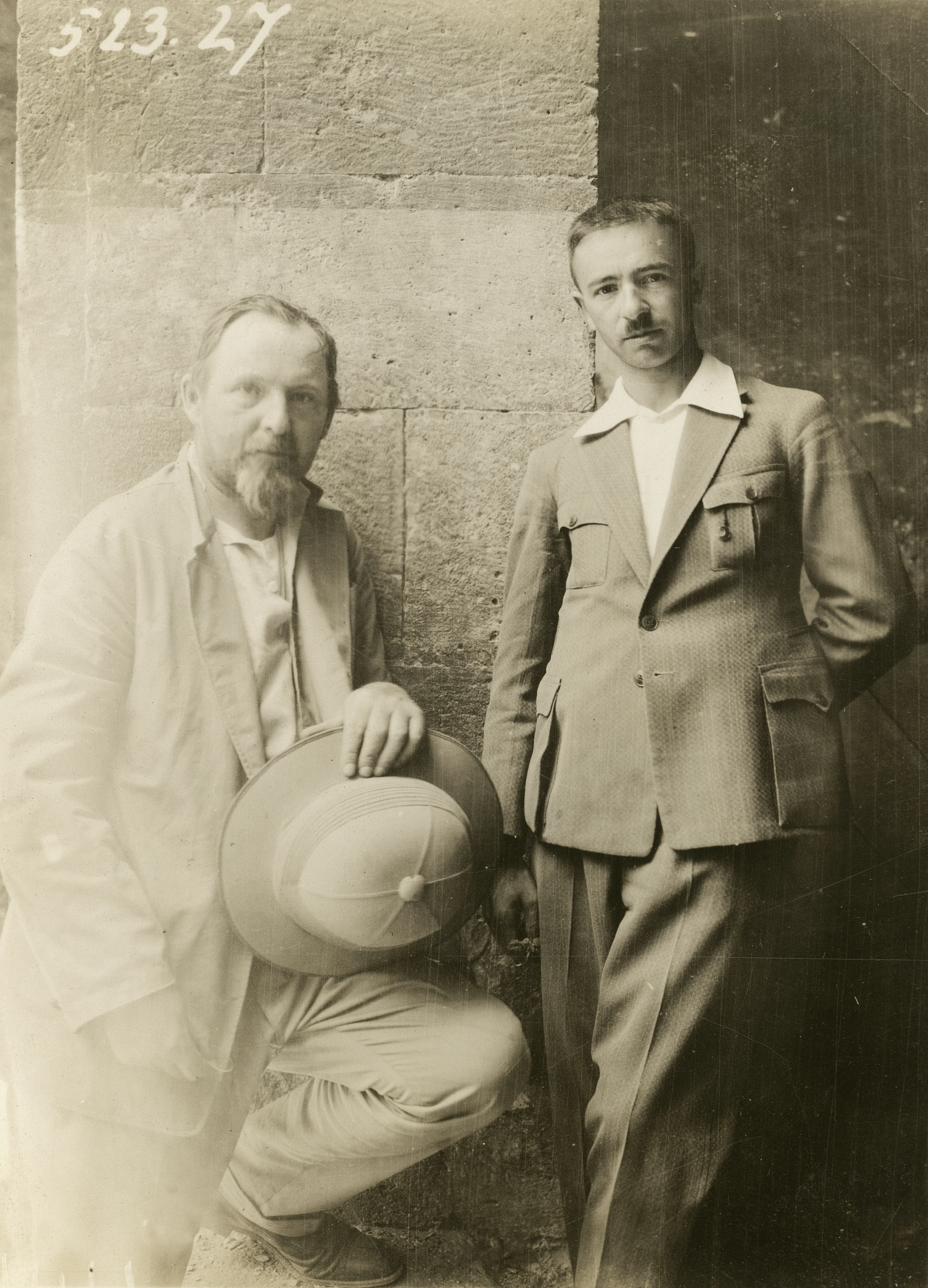
Rudolf Meyer Riefstahl with Turgot Halis Bey, c. 1925. Department of Image Collections, National Gallery of Art Library.

== Legacy ==
As well as published books, catalogues and journal articles, Riefstahl left unfinished work some of which has been subsequently published with the help of his wife, Elizabeth Riefstahl, herself a much published scholar who collaborated with him during his lifetime. For example, an article in Ars Islamica on Early Turkish Tile Revetments appeared in the year after his death. Papers and correspondence are held in the archive of the Biblioteca Berenson at Villa I Tatti and photographs taken in Turkey by Riefstahl are held in the Conway Library at The Courtauld Institute of Art, London, whose archive, of primarily architectural images, is in the process of being digitised under the wider Courtauld Connects project. The Department of Image Collection at the National Gallery of Art Library holds a collection of 10,000 photographs of Anatolian architecture and Islamic art taken by or for Rudolf Riefstahl, as well as some papers, lecture notes, and syllabi.

Riefstahl was also a collector, and items from his collection are held in various museums; a reclining figure sculpture from the Parthian period in the Harvard Art Museums, an homilectic fragment in the Morgan Library and Museum and a textile fragment from the 11th–12th century in the Brooklyn Museum.

== Personal life ==
Riefstahl married Elizabeth Titzel in 1924 in Chicago and they had a daughter, Marian, and a son, Rudolf. Their son, Rudolf Meyer Riefstahl II, born in Istanbul, was also an art historian who worked in the Fogg Art Museum of Harvard University and the Toledo Museum of Art. Elizabeth Titzel Riefstahl outlived her husband by some fifty years and continued working for most of her life. Riefstahl married first Marie Louise Nordlinger (1876–1961) in 1911 in Paris and they had a son, Albert, and a daughter, Pauline.

== Selected publications ==
- An Exhibition of Persian and Indian Miniature Paintings: from the collections of Demotte, Inc., catalogue by Rudolf M. Riefstahl, New York: Gotchnag Press, 1934
- Turkish Architecture in Southwestern Anatolia, Cambridge, Mass.: Harvard University Press, 1931
- A short bibliography for the student of Oriental and western handknotted rugs and carpets, New York: New York University Press Bookstore, 1926
- Turkish "bird" rugs and their design, New York: College Art Association of America, New York University, 1925
- Persian and Indian textiles from the late sixteenth to the early nineteenth century: an album of thirty six plates, New York : E. Weyhe, 1923
- The Parish-Watson Collection of Mohammadan Potteries, New York: E. Weyhe, 1922
- Catalogue of an unique collection of Greek and Roman marbles, important gothic sculptures, primitive paintings, ceramics, tapestries and ancient rugs, including two monumental altars and a Greek iconostas, coming from historical collections and gathered in England, France, Austria, Italy and the Levant by a well-known European connoisseur during many years of discriminating collecting. The entire collection of 824 objects to be sold at public auction at the Anderson Galleries, New York City, on January twenty-sixth to twenty-ninth [1921] inclusive. New York: Anderson Galleries Inc., 1921
