= Concepción Blanco Mínguez =

Spanish archaeologist

Concepción Blanco Mínguez (1907–1994) was an archaeologist and served as the director of the Archaeological Museum of Cádiz from 1932 to 1977.

== Biography ==
Mínguez studied Philosophy and Letters (History section) at the Central University of Madrid, graduating in 1930. For two years she worked at the Superior Facultative Body of Archives, Libraries and Museums. In 1932, she became the director of the Provincial Archaeological Museum of Cádiz, serving as an Excavation Inspector throughout the province. Her nomination reflected the Second Spanish Republic's ambition to involve more women in public administration.

In addition to this position, Minguez was a professor at the Columela Institute, becoming the first woman to teacher there. Mínguez taught from 1933 to 1943 and also lectured at the Distance University. On an interim basis, she served as the director of the archive of the Treasury Delegation and was a member of the Adolfo de Castro Chair of the Institute of Cadiz Studies as well as the Royal Academy of Fine Arts of Cádiz.

She officially retired in 1977, and was succeeded by Ramón Corzo Sánchez in 1978.

Minguez died in Cádiz in 1994, at the age of 87.

== Publications ==
- "El Museo Arqueológico de Cádiz". En Revista Geográfica Española, 13. (1943)
- "El tesoro del Cortijo de Évora". En Archivo Español de Arqueología. 50-57.(1959)
- "Memorias del Museo Arqueológico Provincial de Cádiz". (1940, 1941, 1942, 1943, 1944, 1945, 1946, 1947). En Memorias de los Museos Arqueológicos Provinciales, Madrid.
- "El mosaico de 'Marchenilla' (Jimena de la Frontera, Cádiz)". En Noticiario Arqueológico Hispánico, VIII-IX. 190–192. (1964–1965)
- "Nuevas piezas fenicias del Museo Arqueológico de Cádiz". En Archivo Español de Arqueología. 50–61. (1970)

== Acknowledgments ==
On March 7, 1994, an act was organized in her memory organized by the Royal Academy of Fine Arts of Cádiz, which was later published.

== Bibliography ==
- s.a (1994) A Concepción Blanco Mínguez, in memoriam. Boletín del Museo de Cádiz, 6:5
- vvaa (1994) Acto en memoria de Doña Concepción Blanco, Cádiz. Real Academia de Bellas Artes de Cádiz.
