= Ursicina Martínez =

Spanish archaeologist (1906–2004)

Ursicina Martínez Gallego
- Born: April 20, 1906; Santa Cristina de la Polvorosa, Spain
- Died: December 14, 2004 (aged 98)
- Occupation: Archaeologist

Ursicina Martínez Gallego (April 20, 1906 – December 14, 2004) was a Spanish archaeologist.

== Early life and education ==
Martínez was born on April 20, 1906, in Santa Cristina de la Polvorosa, in the province of Zamora, Spain. Her parents, from the region of La Carballeda, owned a grocery store. Her father died when she was eleven years old.

Martínez attended high school in Benavente. In 1922, she began studying education at the Normal School of Zamora at the insistence of her mother, despite wanting to attend university. A year later, she left the Normal School and enrolled in Philosophy and Letters in 1923 at the Central University of Madrid, being one of the first women who could access higher education in Spain. She was a student of Julián Besteiro, Claudio Sánchez-Albornoz, Elís Tormo, and Manuel Gómez-Moreno, among others. She graduated with an Extraordinary Award and began her doctoral thesis The Travels of Marco Polo, though she did not finish it.

== Career ==
In 1930, Martínez passed the exams for the Facultative Corps of Archivists, Librarians and Archaeologists. The following year she was assigned to the direction of the Museo de León, installed in the building of the convent of San Marcos.

Cuerpo Facultativo de Archiveros, Bibliotecarios y Arqueolgos (CFABA) welcome Ursicina Martinez and three other women from 1930-1931.

When the Civil War broke out on July 18, 1936, the property was seized and used as a concentration camp for Republican prisoners, which led to the closure of the museum. Martínez was reassigned to the provincial library, where she remained until she requested a transfer on November 27, 1941, distressed by the museum's condition after the war. During this time, she began to teach geography and history classes at the Padre Isla de León Institute.

She returned to Zamora, where she replaced Carmen Pescador del Hoyo, who was purged by the Franco regime for political reasons, as director of the public library. She combined her work in the library with teaching Latin at the Claudio Moyano Institute.

In the 1960s, Martínez founded a municipal library in her hometown.

On February 18, 1971, she was appointed director of the House of Culture of Zamora.

She retired in 1976, at the age of 70.

Martínez promoted and was a founding member of the Florián de Ocampo Institute of Zamorano Studies.

== Legacy ==
The city of Zamora, in recognition of her work in favor of culture in the capital and in the province, gave her name to a public space, in a garden located between Diego de Losada street and Eduardo Barrón park. The proposal was presented by the Socialist Party and ultimately supported by all represented parties within the Zamora City Council.
