= Elizabeth Titzel Riefstahl =

American anthropologist and archaeologist

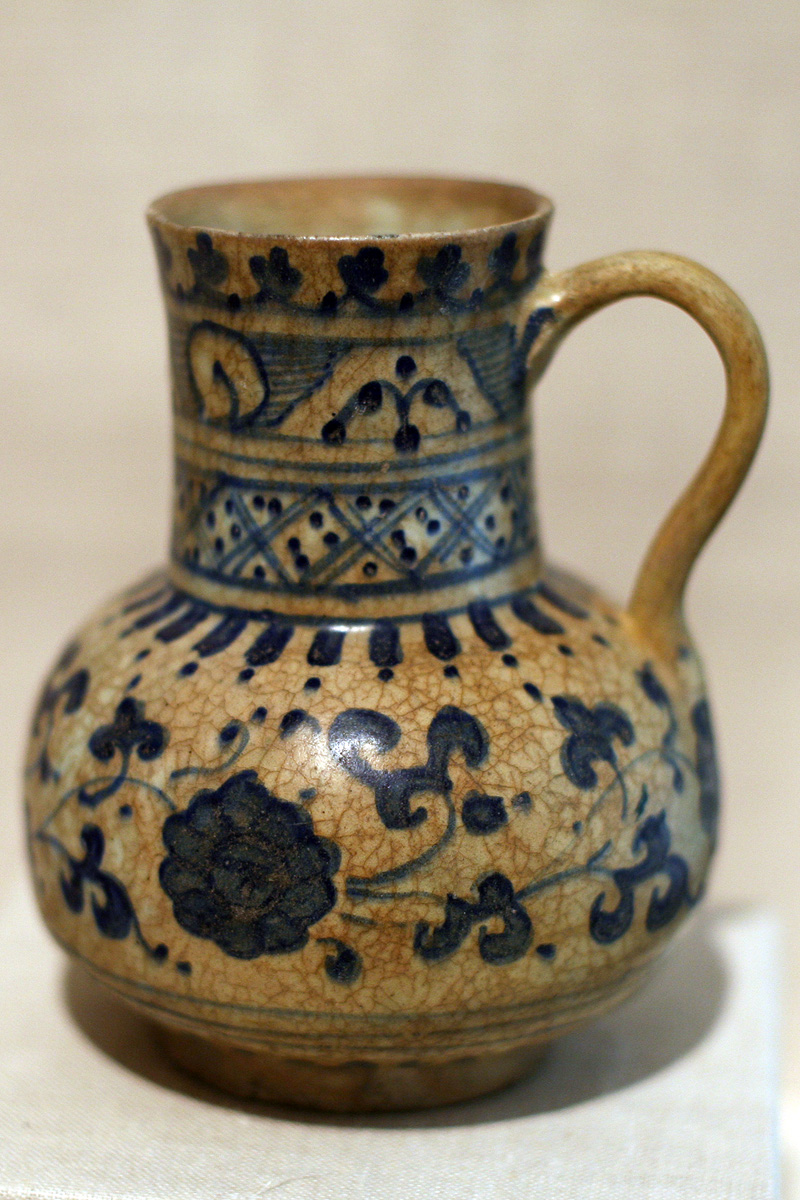
A ceramic jar given to the Brooklyn Museum in honor of Elizabeth Riefstahl

Mary Elizabeth Titzel Riefstahl (March 8, 1889 – September 15, 1986) was an American anthropologist and archaeologist who specialized in artwork from the Near East. She also served as a librarian and curator for the Wilbour Library of Egyptology of the Brooklyn Museum.

== Early years and education ==
Mary Elizabeth Titzel was born in Butler, Pennsylvania on March 8, 1889. She received a Bachelor of Arts degree in 1910, and began teaching English Composition.

== Career ==
After a single quarter of teaching, she gave it up to pursue a career in journalistic writing. In 1922 she traveled to Jordan and Palestine, and published three articles in the journal Asia: the American Magazine on the Orient based on her experiences. In 1924 she married Rudolf Meyer Riefstahl, an Islamic Art professor and historian working at New York University's Institute of Fine Arts. They had two children: Marian who was born on April 26, 1926, in New York City; and Rudolph, born in 1929 in Istanbul, who was the first American child to be granted Turkish citizenship due to recent changes in their birth citizenship laws. In 1934 the couple jointly published a number of monographs which in turn produced a number of articles in various art publications such as Art Studies and Roma.

After Rudolf's death in 1936, Elizabeth was hired by the Brooklyn Museum to be a librarian for their recently opened Wilbour Library of Egyptology, named for American Egyptologist Charles Edwin Wilbour. During this time, her area of study moved towards the pharaonic and Early Christian periods. Her first paper on the subject was published in 1938, in the Brooklyn Museum Quarterly. During World War II, she took over curator duties while the former curator, John D. Cooney was fighting in the war. During the time the two shared extensive correspondence concerning museum business, and Riefstahl deferred to Cooney for major decisions regarding acquisitions. During her period as de facto curator, she published a number of articles and books for the museum. When Cooney returned from the war, Riefstahl continued to run the Wilbour library and publish her findings regarding the artifacts that the museum acquired.

In 1953, she served as a technical advisor for the movie The Egyptian. After returning to the Wilbour Library for another year, she requested her retirement, effective September 30, 1956. On December 7, 1955, she was given the title Associate Curator Emeritus of the Wilbour Collection in recognition for her services to the museum.

Riefstahl's retirement was shortly followed by the beginning of her employment by the American Research Center in Egypt (ARCE), headquartered in Boston, Massachusetts. Her position was that of Executive Secretary, and she continued to publish and edit during this time, including doing work for her former employers at the Brooklyn Museum, notably the catalog for the Egyptian Sculptures of the Late Period exhibition in 1960. During this time, she also published her first book, Thebes in the Time of Amunhotep III. She held employment with the ARCE until 1969.

After retiring from the ACRE, she returned to the Brooklyn Museum, where she served as the Curator of Ancient Art, where she acted as an editor for the entire department, as well as continued to write her own pieces. This continued until 1975, when she retired from the museum for a second time on September 22.

She died on September 15, 1986.

== Selected works ==
- "Beyond Jordan I" Asia: The American Magazine on the Orient 23 (1923) 49–52, 68-71
- "Beyond Jordan II" Asia: The American Magazine on the Orient 23 (1923) 105–8, 143-44
- "The Too Much Promised Land" Asia: The American Magazine on the Orient 23 (1923) 256–61, 297-99
- "A Tempest in a Snuff Bottle" Brooklyn Museum Quarterly 25, no. 2 (April 1938) 37-48
- Toilet Articles from Ancient Egypt from the Charles Edwin Wilbour Memorial Collection and the Collection of The New York Historical Society in The Brooklyn Museum Brooklyn: The Museum. (1943)
- Patterned Textiles in Pharaonic Egypt Brooklyn: The Museum. (1944)
- "An Ancient Egyptian Hairdresser" Brooklyn Museum Bulletin 13, no. 4 (Summer 1952) 7-16 JSTOR 26458650
- "Nemesis and the Wheel of Fate" Brooklyn Museum Bulletin 17, no. 3 (Spring 1956) 1-7 JSTOR i26457813
- Egyptian Sculpture of the Late Period 700 B.C. to A.D. 100. Edited by Elizabeth Riefstahl. Brooklyn: The Museum. (1960)
- Thebes in the Time of Amunhotep III Norman: University of Oklahoma Press. (1964)
- "A Note on Ancient Fashions: Four Early Egyptian Dresses in the Museum of Fine Arts, Boston" Boston Museum of Fine Arts Bulletin 68, no. 354 (1970) 244-259
