= Malcolm H. Wiener =

American attorney, prehistorian and philanthropist (1935–2026)

- Born: Malcolm Hewitt Wiener; July 3, 1935; Qingdao, China
- Died: October 12, 2026 (aged 91)
- Education: Harvard University
- Occupations: Attorney, prehistorian, philanthropist
- Spouses: Mary F. McLarnon (m. 1975, divorced) Carolyn Talbot Seely (m. 1990)
- Children: 4
- Website: Official website

Malcolm H. Wiener (July 3, 1935 – October 12, 2026) was an American attorney, prehistorian and philanthropist who served as general counsel of the Archaeological Institute of America, as an advisor for the United States Department of State and as principal and chairman of The Millburn Ridgefield Corporation and ShareInVest, both asset management firms.

In 1988, Wiener endowed the Malcolm Wiener Center for Social Policy at the Harvard Kennedy School of Government at Harvard University in Cambridge, Massachusetts. The center focuses on increasing social and economic wellbeing, equity and opportunity, and to advance the cause of social justice and effective social programs. He was also a trustee emeritus of the Metropolitan Museum of Art and a member of the Council on Foreign Relations. He held honorary doctorates from multiple institutions, including the University of Cincinnati.

== Early life and education ==
Wiener was born July 3, 1935, in Qingdao, China, to American parents Myron Wiener and Ethel Wiener (née Zimmerman). He was raised in a Jewish family. His mother was born in Yantai to Russian-born Samuel Zimmerman and she died when he was only four days old. Wiener came to the United States to San Francisco in 1939.

He was awarded a Naval Reserve Officers' Training Corps scholarship for study at Harvard College; the award was made "on the basis of financial need, and high academic personal promise in class and extracurricular activities". He graduated magna cum laude with an honors thesis in economics and was elected to Phi Beta Kappa. While at Harvard, he was president of the University Chess Club. Between his years at Harvard College (1953–1957) and Harvard Law School (1960–1963), he served at sea as an Ensign/Lieutenant JG in the United States Navy from 1957 to 1960.

== Career ==
Wiener was the founder and CEO of The Millburn Corporation (later Millburn Ridgefield LLC, 1977–1997) CommInVest (1977–1997) and ShareInVest (1982–1997). In 1981 he founded the Institute for Aegean Prehistory (INSTAP) and in 1984 the Malcolm Hewitt Wiener Foundation (both are registered non-profit organizations). From 1996 to 2010, he served as a Trustee of the Metropolitan Museum of Art. From 1984 to 2016, he served as a Trustee of the American School of Classical Studies at Athens, the last five years as Chair of the Board; at the American School, he proposed and funded the Malcolm H. Wiener Laboratory for Archaeological Science (1992).

The Malcolm Wiener Center for Social Policy at Harvard Kennedy School at Harvard University was founded and funded by Wiener. The Center encompasses programs in health, criminal justice, housing, education, and inequality. Wiener also published several works on economic policy.

He was a member of the Council on Foreign Relations. There, he was active in promoting the consideration of non-lethal military technologies; in particular, he chaired and authored the report of a CFR Independent Task Force on the subject in 1995. He also endowed the CFR Annual Lecture on Science and Technology.

Wiener is the author of numerous works on Aegean prehistory and the eastern Mediterranean in the Bronze Age. Several works have focused on the chronology of the Bronze Age Mediterranean world. His publication "The Interaction of Climate Change and Agency in the Collapse of Civilizations ca. 2300–2000 B.C." (2014) has attracted notice for its contribution to the history of climate change episodes in world history.

== Personal life and death ==
Wiener's first marriage was to Mary F. McLarnon in 1975.

On June 8, 1990, Wiener married Carolyn Talbot Seely (born 1948), a daughter of Mr. & Mrs. Frederic T. Seely, of Old Greenwich, Connecticut. She was Counsel to the Republican Leader Bob Dole and an Adjunct Professor at the University of Baltimore's School of Law. They have four children together.

- Catherine "Kate" Wiener (born 1993), a Yale graduate, married to Riley Ford, who is a great-great-grandson of George Gough Booth and Ellen Scripps Booth, of the founding family of The Detroit News.
- Elizabeth Seely Wiener (born 1994), a Harvard graduate.
- Thomas F. Wiener (born 2001)
- Jonathan P. Wiener (born 2001)

He was a resident of Greenwich, Connecticut. Malcolm H. Wiener died on October 12, 2026, at the age of 91. His death was announced with a message of condolences by the Greek Minister of Culture Lina Mendoni.

== Awards and recognition ==
Wiener received seven honorary doctorates: Litt.D., University of Sheffield, 1997; Ph.D., University of Tübingen, 1998; D., University of Athens, 1998; Dr. of Humane Letters, University of Cincinnati, 2007; D.Sc., University College London, 2009; D. Archaeology, Dickinson College, 2013; D.Sc., and University of Arizona, 2014.

He was a Fellow or Member of the following: the Academy of Athens, the American Academy of Arts and Sciences, the Archaeological Institute of America, the Austrian Academy of Sciences, the Austrian Archaeological Institute, the German Archaeological Institute, the Royal Swedish Academy of Letters, History and Antiquities, and the Society of Antiquaries of London. He was a Chevalier in the Ordre des Arts et des Lettres of France and an Honorary Member of the Board of the Archaeological Society at Athens. He also received the Ring of Honour of the Academy of Sciences and Literature in Mainz, Germany. Additionally, he received the Bandelier Award for Public Service to Archaeology from the Archaeological Institute of America, and the Philhellene Award and Athens Prize from the American School of Classical Studies at Athens. In 2014, the Greek government bestowed upon him the Gold Cross of the Order of Honor.

== Publications ==
- "The Dating Game: The History and Present State of the Controversy Concerning the Date of the Theran Eruption", CHRONOS: Stratigraphic Analysis, Pottery Seriation and Radiocarbon Dating in Mediterranean Chronology, 2024, pp. 181–189.
- "Processions Aplenty: From Elite Palatial Parades to Mass Population Pilgrimages in Middle and Late Minoan Crete", Processions: Bronze Age Ceremonial Studies Presented to Robert B. Koehl, 2023, pp. 3–7.
- "Travels with Hugh", Megistos Kouros: Studies in Honour of Hugh Sackett, 2022.
- "The Population and Depopulation of Late Minoan Crete", Kleronomia: Legacy and Inheritance. Studies on the Aegean Bronze Age in Honor of Jeffrey S. Soles, 2022, pp. 217–228.
- "The Fateful Century: From the Destruction of Crete ca. 1450–1440 to the Destruction of Knossos ca. 1350–1340", One State, Many Worlds: Crete in the Late Minoan II-IIIA2 Early Period. Proceedings of the International Conference Held at Khania, Μεγάλο Αρσενάλι, 21st–23rd November 2019, 2022, pp. 97–115.
- "Minoan Colonization", Political Geographies of the Bronze Age Aegean. Proceedings of the Joint Workshop of the Belgian School at Athens (EBSA) and the Netherlands Institute at Athens (NIA) May 28 to 31, 2019, 2022, pp. 251–257.
- "The Contribution of Archaeological Science to the Study of Animals in Aegean Prehistory", Zoia. Animal-Human Interactions in the Aegean Middle and Late Bronze Age. Proceedings of the 18th International Aegean Conference, originally to be held at the Program in Aegean Scripts and Prehistory, in the Department of Classics, The University of Texas at Austin, May 28–31, 2020, Aegaeum 45, 2021, pp. 29–33.
- "Helladic Greece from the Middle Bronze Age to c. 1350 BCE", From Past to Present. Studies in Memory of Manfred O. Korfmann, 2020, pp. 279–331.
- "Foreword", Πύρρα. Μελέτες για την αρχαιολογία στην Κεντρική Ελλάδα προς τιμήν της Φανουρίας Δακορώνια, 2018.
- "The Impact of Climate Change, Famines, Mass Migrations, Epidemics, and Warfare in the Collapse of Civilizations: Recent Evidence from Archaeological Science", Πρακτικα της Aκαδημία Aθηνών 93 B, 2018, pp. 49–68.
- "The Significance of Recent Developments in Egyptian Chronology for the Absolute Chronology of Late Helladic I–III and the Middle, Recent, and Final Bronze Age Chronology of Italy", MEDITERRANEA ITINERA: Studies in Honour of Lucia Vagnetti, 2018, pp. 3–10.
- "The Collapse of Civilizations", Belfer Center Paper, September 2018. Belfer Center for Science and International Affairs, Harvard Kennedy School.
- "Causes of Complex Systems Collapse in the Aegean, Eastern Mediterranean, Anatolia and Italy at the End of the Bronze Age", "Sea Peoples" Up-to-Date: New Research on the Transformations in the Eastern Mediterranean in the 13th–11th Centuries BCE, 2017, pp. 43–74.
- "Il mondo miceneo e Omero", Manuale di Epigrafia Micenea. Introduzione allo studio dei testi in lineare B, 2016, pp. 23–50.
- "Helladic Pairs of Cups", Studies in Aegean Art and Culture. A New York Aegean Bronze Age Colloquium in Memory of Ellen N. Davis, 2016, pp. 11–26.
- "Beyond the Versailles Effect: Mycenaean Greece and Minoan Crete", RA-PI-NE-U: Studies on the Mycenaean World Offered to Robert Laffineur for His 70th Birthday, Aegis 10, 2016, pp. 365–378.
- "Aegean Warfare at the Opening of the Late Bronze Age in Image and Reality", METAPHYSIS. Ritual, Myth and Symbolism in the Aegean Bronze Age. Proceedings of the 15th International Aegean Conference, Institute for Oriental and European Archaeology, Austrian Academy of Sciences and Institute of Classical Archaeology, University of Vienna (22–25 April 2014), Aegaeum 39, 2016, pp. 139–146.
- "The Scientific Study of Antiquity", Daedalus 145.2, 2016, p. 112.
- "Oh, No—Not Another Chronology!" The Art and Culture of Ancient Egypt: Studies in Honor of Dorothea Arnold (Bulletin of the Egyptological Seminar 19, 2010), 2015, pp. 649–663.
- "The Mycenaean Conquest of Minoan Crete", The Great Islands: Studies of Crete and Cyprus Presented to Gerald Cadogan, 2015, pp. 131–142.
- "Dating the Theran Eruption: Archaeological Science Versus Nonsense Science", Israel's Exodus in Transdisciplinary Perspective, 2015, pp. 131–143.
- "The Interaction of Climate Change and Agency in the Collapse of Civilizations ca. 2300–2000 BC", Radiocarbon 56(4) / Tree-Ring Research 70(3), 2014, pp. S1–16.
- "Dating the Emergence of Historical Israel in Light of Recent Developments in Egyptian Chronology", Tel Aviv 41, 2014, pp. 49–53.
- "Radiocarbon Dating of the Theran Eruption", Proceedings of the 38th International Symposium on Archaeometry, Tampa, Florida, May 10–14, 2010, Open Journal of Archaeometry 2, 5265, 2014.
- "Realities of Power: The Minoan Thalassocracy in Historical Perspective", АΜΙΛΛΑ: The Quest for Excellence. Studies Presented to Guenter Kopcke in Celebration of His 75th Birthday, 2013, pp. 149–173.
- "'Minding the Gap' Gaps, Destructions, and Migrations in the Early Bronze Age Aegean: Causes and Consequences", American Journal of Archaeology 117, 2013, pp. 581–592.
- "Contacts: Crete, Egypt and the Near East circa 2000 B.C.", Cultures in Contact: From Mesopotamia to the Mediterranean in the Second Millennium B.C., 2013, pp. 34–43.
- "Problems in the Measurement, Calibration, Analysis and Communication of Radiocarbon Dates (with Special Reference to the Prehistory of the Aegean World)", Proceedings of Radiocarbon and Archaeology, 6th International Symposium, Pafos, Cyprus, April 10–15, 2011, special issue, Radiocarbon 54(3–4), 2012, pp. 423–434.
- "Conical Cups: From Mystery to History", Our Cups Are Full: Pottery and Society in the Aegean Bronze Age. Studies in Honor of Jeremy B. Rutter on the Occasion of His Birthday, 2011, pp. 355–368.
- "Carl William Blegen (1887–1971)", "Sir Arthur John Evans (1851–1941)" and "Mycenae", Homer Encyclopedia, 2011, pp. 133–135, 280–281, 535–538.
- "A Point in Time", Cretan Offerings: Studies in Honour of Peter Warren (British School at Athens Suppl. 18), 2010, pp. 367–394.
- "Locating Ahhiyawa", ΔΩΡΟΝ:Τιμητικοσ Τομοσ για τον Καθηγητη Σπυρο Ιακωβιδη, 2009, pp. 701–715.
- Thera Discussion: "M.H. Wiener's Reply to the Papers by Manning et al. and Friedrich et al." and "M.H. Wiener's Response to the Friedrich et al. and Manning et al. Responses", Tree–Rings, Kings, and Old World Archaeology and Environment: Papers Presented in Honor of Peter Ian Kuniholm, 2009, pp. 317–332.
- "Cold Fusion: The Uneasy Alliance of History and Science", Tree-Rings, Kings, and Old World Archaeology and Environment: Papers Presented in Honor of Peter Ian Kuniholm, 2009, pp. 277–292.
- "The State of the Debate about the Date of the Theran Eruption", Time's Up: Dating the Minoan Eruption of Santorini, Acts of the Minoan Eruption Chronology Workshop, Sandbjerg (November 2007), 2009, pp. 197–206.
- "Neopalatial Knossos: Rule and Role", Krinoi kai Limenes: Studies in Honor of Joseph and Maria Shaw, 2007, pp. 231–242.
- "Homer and History: Old Questions, New Evidence", EPOS: Reconsidering Greek Epic and Aegean Bronze Age Archaeology, Proceedings of the 11th International Aegean Conference, Los Angeles, UCLA-The J. Paul Getty Villa (20–23 April 2006), Aegaeum 28, 2007, pp. 3–33, ills. I–II.
- "Times Change: The Current State of the Debate in Old World Chronology", Proceedings of the 2nd EuroConference of "SCIEM 2000", 28 May–1 June 2003, Vienna, 2007, pp. 25–47.
- "Palatial Potters in Mycenaean Greece", ΣΤΕΦΑΝΟΣ ΑΡΙΣΤΕΙΟΣ: Archäologische Forschungen zwischen Nil und Istros. Festschrift für Stefan Hiller zum 65. Geburtstag, 2007, pp. 271–277.
- Malcolm H. Wiener et al. (eds.), Pottery and Society, The Impact of Recent Studies in Minoan Pottery, Gold Medal Colloquium in Honor of Philip P. Betancourt, 104th Annual Meeting of the Archaeological Institute of America, New Orleans, Louisiana (5 January 2003), 2006.
- "Pots and Polities", Pottery and Society, The Impact of Recent Studies in Minoan Pottery, Gold Medal Colloquium in Honor of Philip P. Betancourt, 104th Annual Meeting of the Archaeological Institute of America, New Orleans, Louisiana (5 January 2003), 2006, pp. 1-21.
- "Egypt and Time", Egypt and the Levant 16, 2006, pp. 325-339.
- "Chronology Going Forward (With a Query about 1525/4 B.C.)", Timelines: Studies in Honour of Manfred Bietak, Vol. 3, 2006, pp. 317-328.
- "The Absolute Chronology of Late Helladic III A2 Revisited", Annual of the British School at Athens 98, 2003, pp. 239–250.
- "Time Out: The Current Impasse in Bronze Age Archaeological Dating", METRON: Measuring the Aegean Bronze Age, Proceedings of the 9th International Aegean Conference, New Haven, Yale University (18–21 April 2002), Aegaeum 24, 2003, pp. 363–399, ills. LXX–LXXI.
- "Report on the Final General Discussion: Introductory Remarks", LH IIIC Chronology and Synchronisms, Proceedings of the International Workshop held at the Austrian Academy of Sciences at Vienna, (7–8 May 2001), 2003, pp. 245–247.
- "The White Slip I of Tell el-Dab'a and Thera: Critical Challenge for the Aegean Long Chronology", The White Slip Ware of Late Bronze Age Cyprus, Proceedings of an International Conference Organized by the Anastasios G. Leventis Foundation, Nicosia in Honour of Malcolm Wiener, Nicosia (29–30 October 1998), Contributions to the Chronology of the Eastern Mediterranean, Vol. 2, 2001, pp. 195–202.
- "Present Arms / Oars / Ingots: Searching for Evidence of Military or Maritime Administration in LM IB", POLEMOS, Le contexte guerrier en Égée à l'âge du Bronze, Actes de la 7e Rencontre égéenne internationale Université de Liège (14–17 April 1998), Aegaeum 19, 1999, pp. 411–423, ill. LXXX.
- "The Absolute Chronology of Late Helladic IIIA2", Sardinian and Aegean Chronology, Towards the Resolution of Relative and Absolute Dating in the Mediterranean, Proceedings of the International Colloquium 'Sardinian Stratigraphy and Mediterranean Chronology', Tufts University, Medford, Massachusetts (17–19 March 1995), Studies in Sardinian Archaeology 5, 1998, pp. 309–319.
- Co-author (with James M. Allen), "Separate Lives: The Ahmose Tempest Stela and the Theran Eruption", Journal of Near Eastern Studies, 57.1, January 1998, pp. 1–28.
- Editor, "Discussions", Trade, Power and Cultural Exchange: Hyksos Egypt and the Eastern Mediterranean World 1800–1500 B.C., An International Symposium, The Metropolitan Museum of Art (3 November 1993), Ägypten und Levante 5, 1995, pp. 121–132.
- "The Nature and Control of Minoan Foreign Trade", Bronze Age Trade in the Mediterranean, Papers Presented at the Conference held at Rewley House, Oxford (December 1989), Studies in Mediterranean Archaeology 90, 1991, pp. 325–350.
- "The Isles of Crete? The Minoan Thalassocracy Revisited", Thera and the Aegean World III, Vol. 1, Archaeology, Proceedings of the Third International Congress Held in Santorini, Greece (3–9 September 1989), 1990, pp. 128–161.
- "Round-Table Comments", Aegean Seals, Sealings and Administration, Proceedings of the NEH-Dickson Conference of the Program in Aegean Scripts and Prehistory of the Department of Classics, University of Texas at Austin (11–13 January 1989), Aegaeum 5, 1990, pp. 236–239.
- "Trade and Rule in Palatial Crete", The Function of the Minoan Palaces, Proceedings of the Fourth International Symposium at the Swedish Institute in Athens (10–16 June 1984), 1987, pp. 261–268.
- "Crete and the Cyclades in LM I: The Tale of the Conical Cups", The Minoan Thalassocracy: Myth and Reality, Proceedings of the Third International Symposium at the Swedish Institute in Athens (31 May – 5 June 1982), 1984, pp. 17–26.

== Forthcoming publications ==
- "Late Bronze Age Aegean Seaports, in Particular Nauplio", Festschrift, forthcoming.
- "Minoan and Cypro-Minoan: "Linguae Francae?" Festschrift, forthcoming.
- "Known Unknowns: Crete Between the Theran Eruption and the Destructions at the End of LM IB", The Meaning of Pax Minoica: Was Evans Right in the Light of New Evidence?, forthcoming.
- "Dating Events and Objects in the Aegean Bronze Age", Princes of Pylos exhibition catalog, Getty Villa, forthcoming.

== See also ==
- Institute for Aegean Prehistory Study Center for East Crete

== Sources ==
- Biography at the Belfer Center for Science and International Affairs
- "Malcolm Hewitt Wiener to be awarded honorary doctorate" (News release from the University of Cincinnati.)
- Honorary Graduands 2009 – University College London (archived version; current shorter version at )
- "Malcolm Wiener Weds Carolyn Seely", The New York Times, 15 July 1990.
- Betancourt P. P., Karageorghis V., Laffineur R., Niemeier W.-D. (editors), Meletemata: Studies in Aegean Archaeology Presented to Malcolm H. Wiener As He Enters His 65th Year (Aegaeum, University of Liège, 1999) ISBN 978-1-935488-14-9 (Three-volume festschrift, including a biography.)
