= Lucille Proctor Nawara =

American painter and printmaker

Lucille Proctor Nawara (born 1941) is an American landscape painter and printmaker. She was born in Oklahoma City, Oklahoma in 1941 and grew up in Massachusetts. She graduated from Smith College with a Bachelor of Arts degree in 1962. Nawara currently lives and works in Michigan.

== Career ==
Nawara taught studio art at Wayne State University and at the Cranbrook Academy of Art.
