= Cranbrook Academy of Art =

Graduate art school in Bloomfield Hills, Michigan, U.S.

- Type: Private graduate school
- Established: 1932
- Parent institution: Cranbrook Educational Community
- Location: 39221 Woodward Ave., Bloomfield Hills, Michigan, U.S. 42.5675°N 83.2516°W

The Cranbrook Academy of Art, a graduate school for architecture, art, and design, was founded by George Gough Booth and Ellen Scripps Booth in 1932. It is the art school of the Cranbrook Educational Community. Located in Bloomfield Hills, Michigan, United States, Cranbrook grants MFA or MArch degrees to students who have completed a two-year course in graphic design, industrial design, interactive design, architecture, ceramic art, fiber art, metalsmithing, painting, photography, print media, or sculpture. Described as an experiment in radical art education, each department is led by an artist-in-residence, who acts as mentor, advisor, and professor to the students in that department. Cranbrook is closely tied to the Arts and Crafts movement in America.

== History ==
In the 1920s, the Booths began developing a group of public institutions in Bloomfield Hills, Michigan. These would eventually make up the Cranbrook Educational Community. In the spring of 1925, George Booth shared his idea of an arts academy with Finnish architect Eliel Saarinen, who was teaching Booth's son, Henry Booth, at the nearby University of Michigan School of Architecture in Ann Arbor. Booth envisioned a school dedicated to the English Arts and Crafts movement, where artists and craftsmen would teach students through the example of their own work. There was a strong domestic component to the movement; hand-crafted design should be part of daily life and work. Cranbrook was to be a place where artists both worked and lived. The entire Booth family lived at Cranbrook, and Saarinen involved his entire family as well. His wife Loja Saarinen would lead the Weaving and Fiber Department, and their two children, Eero Saarinen and Pipsan Saarinen, grew up and would go on to study at the academy.

In a series of letters during 1925, Booth and Saarinen planned a multi-tiered educational community comprising a church, a primary school, secondary schools for boys and girls, and an art academy.

The school was first headed by Saarinen, who integrated design practices and theories from the Arts and Crafts movement through the international style.

By 1931, artists and craftsmen were already living at Cranbrook, some of them having moved across the world to be there. Finnish architect Eliel Saarinen was the chairman of the Art Council. Carl Milles left the Royal Academy of Fine Arts in Stockholm to lead Cranbrook's Sculpture Department. After the 1930s, modernism eclipsed the Arts and Crafts movement, but the Academy adhered to its Arts and Crafts roots.

Beginning in 1983, a major exhibition of works by Cranbrook's faculty and graduates, Design in America: The Cranbrook Vision 1925–1950, toured major museums in the United States and Europe. The Detroit Institute of Arts and Metropolitan Museum of Art co-authored a book detailing the works in the exhibit.

In 1984, The New York Times wrote that "the effect of Cranbrook and its graduates and faculty on the physical environment of this country has been profound ... Cranbrook, surely more than any other institution, has a right to think of itself as synonymous with contemporary American design."

From 1971 to 1995, the Design department was co-chaired by Michael McCoy and Katherine McCoy (who were married).

== Educational structure ==
The Cranbrook Academy of Art is a graduate-only school oriented around a professional, studio practice. The school continues to be known for its apprenticeship method of teaching, in which a small group of students—usually 10 to 16 per class, or 150 students in total for the 10 departments—study under a single artist-in-residence for the duration of their curriculum. There are no traditional courses; all learning is self-directed under the guidance and supervision of the respective artist-in-residence. Cranbrook is the only surviving experiment in radical art education, having outlasted the Bauhaus and Black Mountain College.

The school currently confers two degrees: Master of Fine Arts and Master of Architecture. The Master of Architecture degree is a post-professional degree and is not accredited by the National Architectural Accrediting Board. Cranbrook Art Academy currently has 11 departments — 2D Design, 3D Design, 4D Design, Architecture, Ceramics, Fiber, Metalsmithing, Painting, Photography, Print Media and Sculpture. The latest department (4D Design) began taking students in the fall of 2019, under the leadership of Carla Diana, a Cranbrook Art Academy alumna. In 2022, Paul Sacaridiz was appointed the Director of the Cranbrook Academy of Art.

== Architecture ==
The entire campus of the Cranbrook Educational Community was designed by Eliel Saarinen in the style of the Arts and Crafts movement. Every wooden door on campus is unique, an example of Gesamtkunstwerk (total design). Director of the Cranbrook Art Museum, Andrew Blauvelt, described the school as the "most designed environment you will ever encounter in the United States".

== Alumni ==
Notable artists, architects, and designers who have studied at Cranbrook Academy of Art include Adela Akers, Olga de Amaral, McArthur Binion, Peter Bohlin, Nick Cave, Niels Diffrient, Charles and Ray Eames, Edward Fella, Gere Kavanaugh, Florence Knoll, Marjorie Kreilick, Jack Lenor Larsen, Donald Lipski, Fumihiko Maki, Myra Mimlitsch-Gray, Annabeth Rosen, Ruth Adler Schnee, Nancy Skolos, Toshiko Takaezu, Lucille Tenazas, Harry Bertoia and Anne Wilson.
