= Cranbrook Schools =

Private school in Bloomfield Hills, Michigan, US

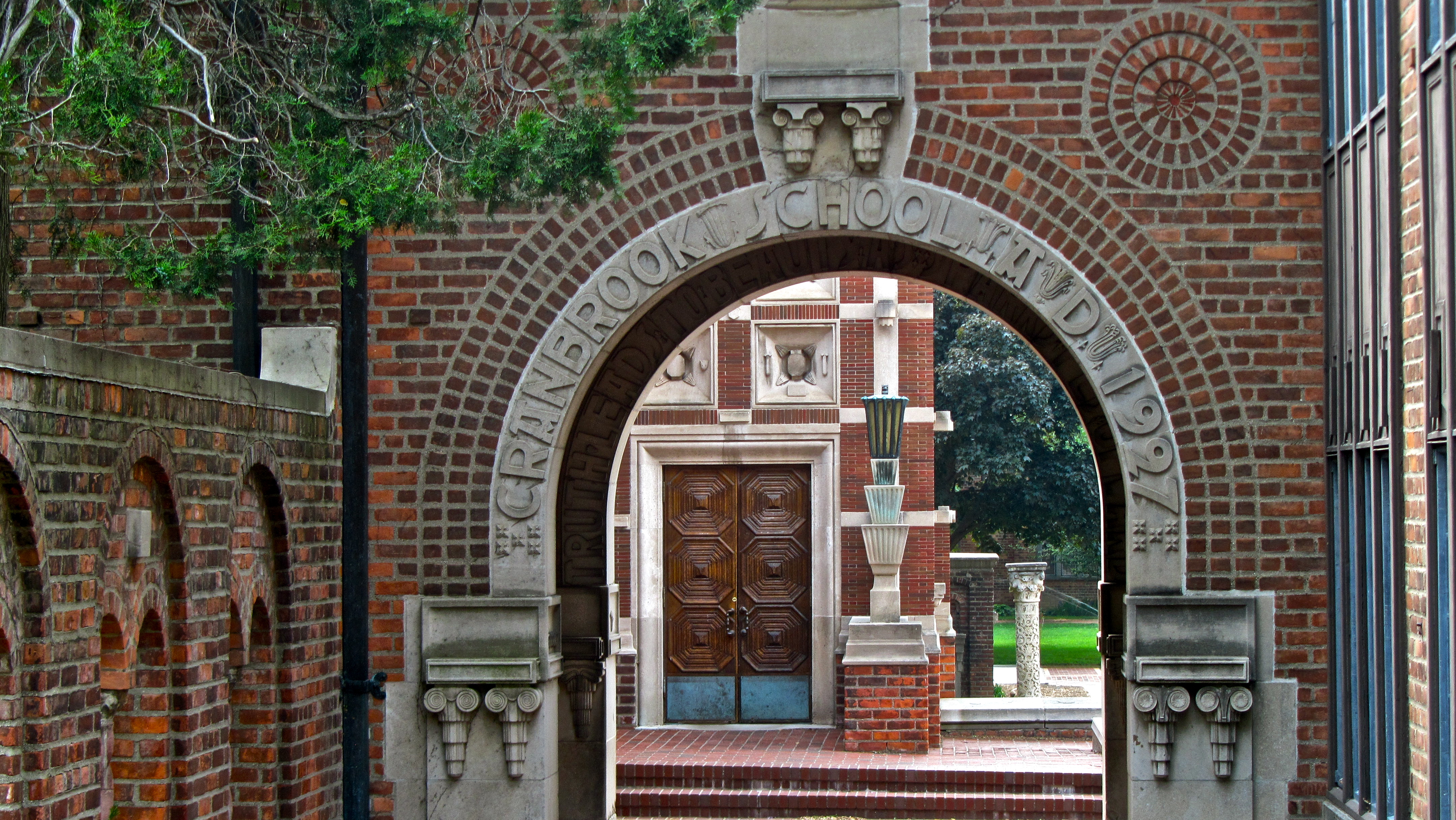
- Entrance gate, showing Saarinen's rich use of brick

Location
- Bloomfield Hills, MI 48304; USA; 42°34′21.6″N 83°14′56.4″W

Information
- Type: Private, Boarding
- Motto: Cranbrook: "Aim High"; Kingswood: "Enter to Learn, Go Forth to Serve"
- Established: 1922; 104 years ago
- Head of school: Jeff Suzik, Ph.D.
- Faculty: 200
- Enrollment: 1658 Students; 506 Pre-K thru 5th Grade; 339 Grades 6th thru 8th 811 Grades 9th thru 12th (257 Boarding, 554 Day)
- Student to teacher ratio: 8:1
- Campus size: 320 acres (130 ha)
- Campus type: Suburban
- Colors: Blue and Green
- Athletics: 25 Interscholastic Sports
- Athletics conference: MHSAA Catholic League Division II
- Mascot: Cranbrook Crane; Kingswood Aardvark
- Tuition: Boarding: $56,600; Day: $41,800
- Website: schools.cranbrook.edu

Cranbrook Schools is a private PK–12 educational institution located on a 319-acre (129 ha) campus in Bloomfield Hills, Michigan. It includes a co-educational elementary school, a middle school with separate schools for boys and girls, and a co-educational college-preparatory high school with boarding facilities. Cranbrook Schools is part of the Cranbrook Educational Community (CEC), which includes the Cranbrook Institute of Science, the Cranbrook Academy of Art, and Cranbrook House and Gardens. Christ Church Cranbrook is also on campus. The Cranbrook community was established by publishing mogul George Booth, who bought the site of today's Cranbrook community in 1904. Cranbrook was designated a National Historic Landmark on June 29, 1989, for its significant architecture and design. It attracts tourists from around the world. Approximately 40 acres (160,000 m^{2}) of Cranbrook Schools' campus are gardens.

As of 2023, Cranbrook Schools had an endowment of $217 million, among the fifteen largest held by America's boarding schools. In addition, the Cranbrook Educational Community, of which the schools is a member, had an endowment in excess of $300 million in 2007.

As of 2021 it had 1,656 students, making it Michigan's largest private school by enrollment in a single campus.

== History of Cranbrook Schools ==
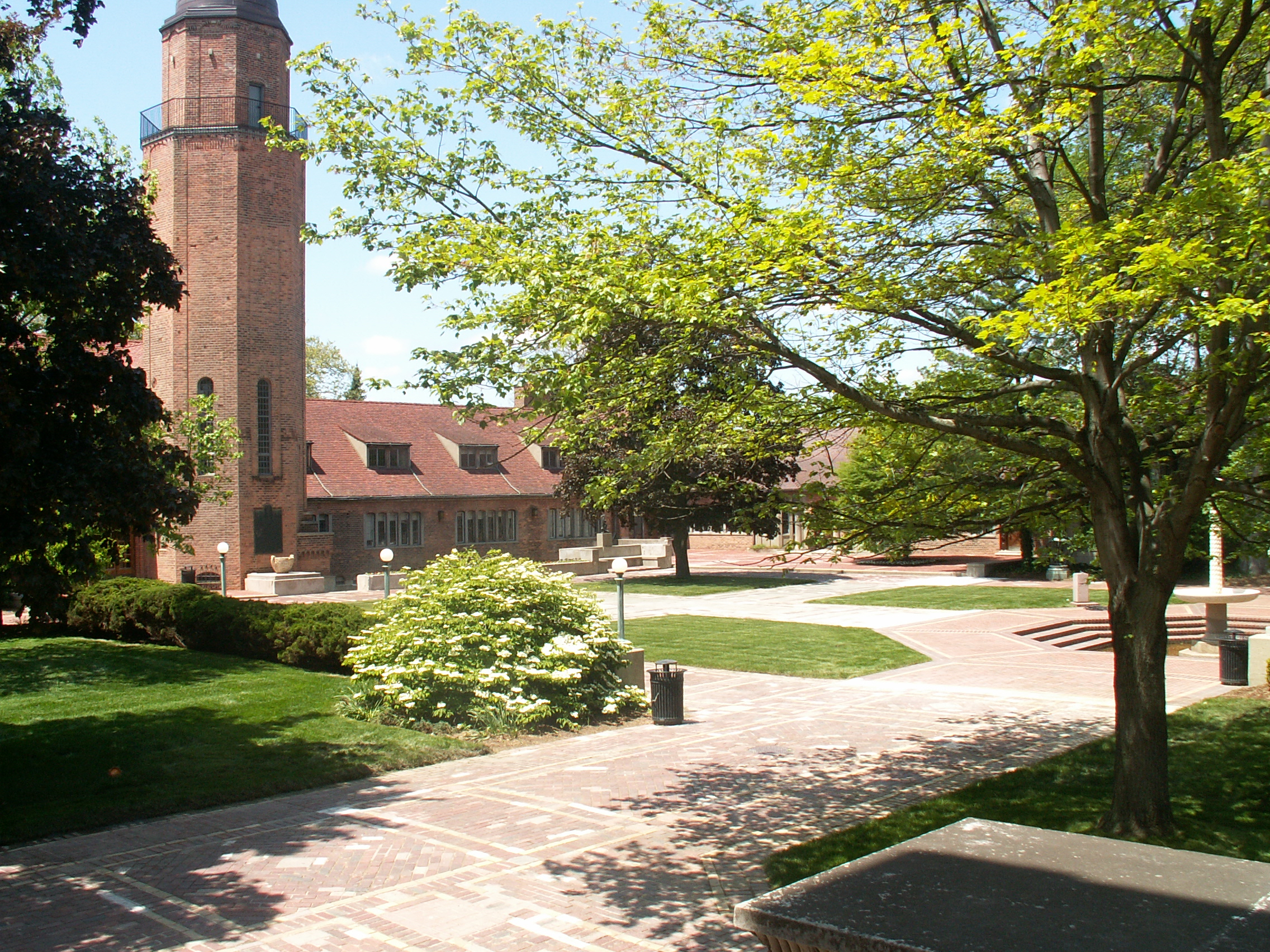
The tower and main quadrangle at Cranbrook Kingswood

In 1915, George and Ellen Booth first opened their property to the public with the construction of a small Greek Theatre. By 1918, they had built the Meeting House, which became the Bloomfield Hills School and began serving local children in grades 1–12 by 1922.

The Booths subsequently expanded their vision to include middle and college-preparatory levels, leading to the 1927 opening of the Cranbrook School for Boys. Named after the English birthplace of George Booth’s father, the campus was designed by world-renowned architect Eliel Saarinen. Completed in 1928, it marked Saarinen’s first executed architectural work in the United States, on which he collaborated with Henry Booth, George’s third son and a former student of Saarinen at the University of Michigan. In 1931, the Saarinen-designed Kingswood School Cranbrook opened for girls, with both schools serving grades 7–12. Meanwhile, the original Bloomfield Hills School was transitioned into an elementary school and renamed Brookside School Cranbrook in 1930.

Unlike the Cranbrook School for Boys, which has several buildings, the Kingswood School has only one building, which includes supporting facilities. It houses dormitories, a dining hall, an auditorium, classrooms, lounge/common areas, a bowling alley, and a ballroom. The education at Kingswood School Cranbrook was initially primarily viewed as a "finishing school". Today, Students take classes in English, History, Religion, and Art at Kingswood. The art classes available are Foundations in Design, Sculpture, Drawing, Weaving, Ceramics, Fashion Design, Painting, and Photography.

For the Booths and Saarinen, the conception and design of the Cranbrook and Kingswood schools were greatly influenced by the Arts and Crafts Movement, which began in 19th-century England. Much of the campus features revival architectural styles emphasizing clay materials such as brick and Ludowici tile.

In 1923, Booth founded an Episcopal church to serve the nascent Cranbrook community, as well as surrounding communities. He chose the firm of Goodhue Associates to design the church. Groundbreaking took place in 1925, and Christ Church Cranbrook was consecrated on September 29, 1928. Originally Cranbrook and Kingswood schools were affiliated with the Episcopal Church, but they have since secularized. However, special occasions are still celebrated at Christ Church Cranbrook.

Cranbrook School, Kingswood School, and Brookside School operated separately until 1970, when it was decided to govern them together. This was followed by the creation of the Cranbrook Educational Community. In 1985, Cranbrook and Kingswood schools were merged to create a co-educational upper school institution.

The middle school did not become co-educational; it was divided into gender-specific campuses in 1984. The Community acquired Vaughan School to house the boys' middle school. The basement of Kingswood was at one point the girls' middle school. A new Middle School building opened in 2010. For boys and girls of grades 6–8, all classes are separate. The exceptions are those for the performing arts (Symphonic Band, Orchestra).

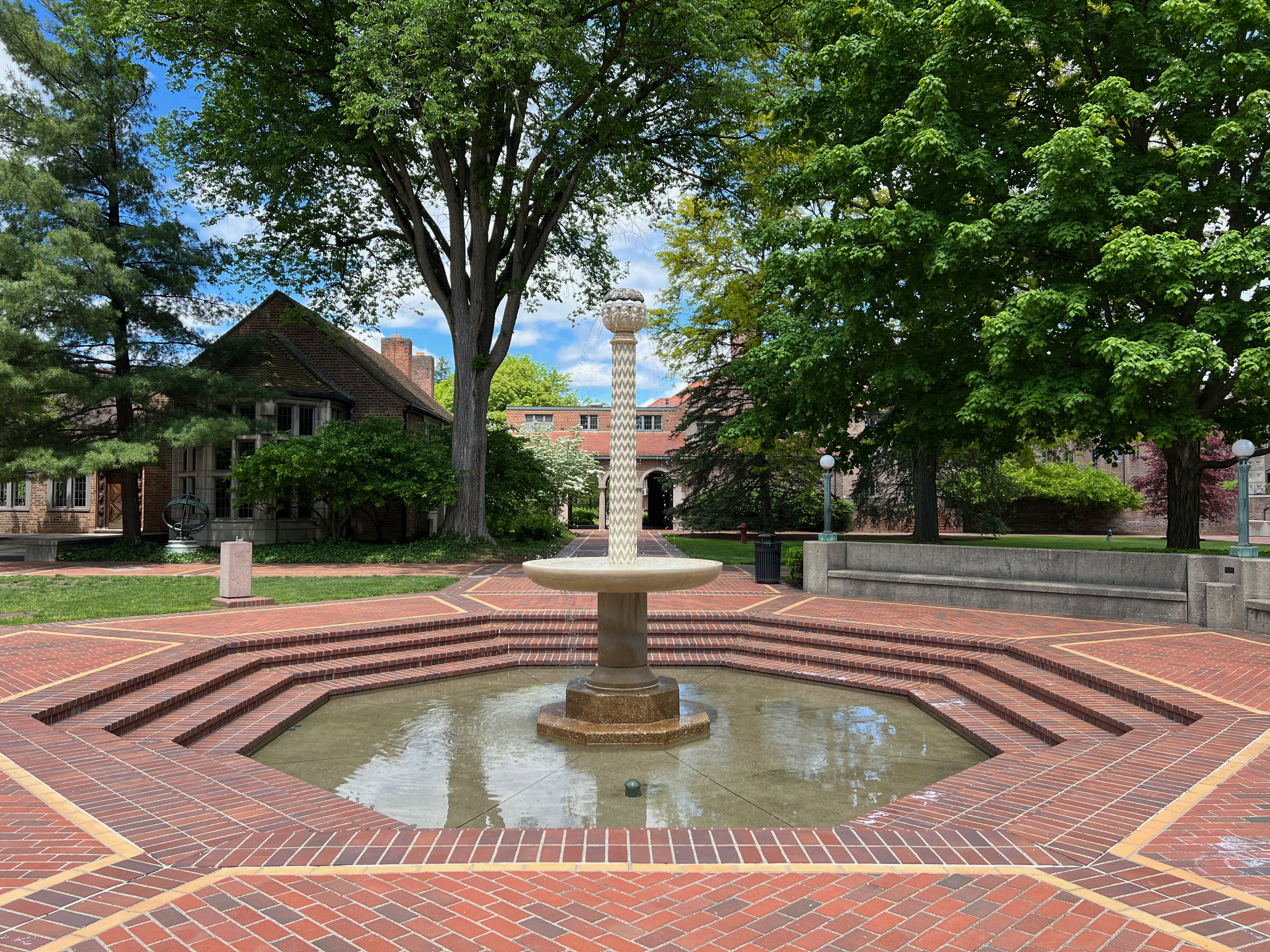
Italian Fountain on the Quad

Architecture critic Paul Goldberger of The New York Times called the Cranbrook campus "one of the greatest campuses ever created anywhere".

== Cranbrook Schools today ==
In 1985, Cranbrook School and Kingswood School were merged to create a coeducational upper school, the Cranbrook Kingswood Upper School. Classes are taught on both the original Cranbrook and Kingswood campuses.

Frequently, the school is referred to as "CK" by its students, faculty, and alumni. Cranbrook Kingswood now lays claim to 70 athletic teams; both men and women's teams earned state championship titles in hockey, tennis, lacrosse, golf and swimming. As of 2011, there were 795 students, approximately one-third of which were boarding students who live in single-sex residence halls. Cranbrook Kingswood accepts slightly fewer than half of all applicants, placing it in the most selective 25% of preparatory schools in the United States.

Several programs offered at Cranbrook have won awards and recognition. The student newspaper The Crane-Clarion has been recognized by the Columbia Scholastic Press Association and the National Scholastic Press Association. In 2009, the Upper School's student literary arts magazine, Gallimaufry, received a Gold Crown award from the Columbia Scholastic Press Association. The robotics and forensics team have also won several state and national awards. Their Model United Nations team has also been placed in the top 75 in North America as of Spring 2012.

Total enrollment at Cranbrook during 2007–08 was 1626, with 780 enrolled in the upper school, 333 in the middle schools, and 513 at the lower school Brookside. (Brookside's numbers include children enrolled in pre-kindergarten, junior kindergarten, and kindergarten at the Vlasic Early Childhood Center, which opened in 1996.) Approximately 11% of Cranbrook Kingswood's students are international students. Traditionally, Cranbrook School also has an exchange program with Cranbrook School, Kent, a boarding school in Cranbrook, Kent, England in honor of George Booth's heritage.

=== Summer programs ===
During the summer months Cranbrook Schools conducts a variety of day and boarding programs on their campus. These include day camps, a soccer clinic, a filmmaking seminar, a compensatory educational program for students from low-income families, a jazz ensemble, ice hockey, lacrosse, and tennis camps as well as the Cranbrook Theater School. The actor Robert Englund taught one summer at the theater school.

=== Iconography ===
The Archer, the symbol of Cranbrook school, is based on an episode in Book V (Latin) of the Aeneid, by Virgil, line 519:

...tamen aerias telum contendit in auras...
...he aimed an arrow high into the breezes of the air...

In an archery contest, a bird is tethered to a cord, and there are four archers. The first three in turn miss, then hit the bird, while the fourth, Acestes, instead shoots his arrow into the air, where it bursts into flames. For this miracle, Acestes is declared the victor.

The design was chosen by William Oliver Stevens, the first headmaster of Cranbrook School, who sketched it. The actual logo was designed by Eero Saarinen.

=== Traditions ===
- Although Cranbrook School for Boys and Kingswood School Cranbrook merged in 1985 to become a single co-ed institution, the school reflects in many ways its history as separate, single-sex entities. (Alumni and alumnae who were enrolled prior to the merger consider themselves graduates of either Cranbrook or Kingswood.) Cranbrook Kingswood Upper School has two different hymns: The Cranbrook Song and the Kingswood Song, which are sung at many school events. Only the boys are invited to attend the Cranbrook Senior Pageant. Boys and girls have separate graduation ceremonies (although they do share in the same Baccalaureate service).
- Since 1971 sophomores have taken part in the Wilderness Expedition, a 10-day backpacking and wilderness camping trip in March that takes place in the Smoky Mountains along the North Carolina-Tennessee border
- Junior leadership ceremonies to celebrate the transition of the juniors to the senior class: A Junior Ring ceremony for girls and the Passage of Leadership ceremony for boys is held at Christ Church Cranbrook
- Cranbrook Kingswood Upper School maintains a dress code: Sweatpants are not allowed on any day except Friday, and on every Wednesday (the so-called Dress Day) boys have to wear a dress shirt with a tie and girls have to wear dresses or dressy tops with skirts or slacks.
- A convocation ceremony is held at the opening of the school year.

=== Popular references ===
- Paper Lion, George Plimpton's non-fiction account of his faux tryout as quarterback for the Detroit Lions in 1963 was set in large measure at Cranbrook (where the Lions trained from 1957 through 1974).
- Eminem's character, Rabbit, in the 2002 film 8 Mile mentions Cranbrook in a rap battle with Papa Doc (portrayed by Anthony Mackie) when he questions Papa Doc's "gangsta" act because he attended Cranbrook, which is a private school.
- The Cranbrook School is also the model for the preparatory school portrayed in Edmund White´s autobiographical novel A Boy's Own Story.
- Lisa Birnbach makes note of Cranbrook in The Official Preppy Handbook and True Prep: It's a Whole New Old World.

== Notable faculty ==
- Dave Barney (1960s), English teacher, head coach for ice hockey and baseball, assistant coach for football
- George Laskowski (1970s–1990s), whose science fiction fanzine Lan's Lantern won a Hugo Award for Best Fanzine
- Alexi Lalas (1980s), American soccer player and commentator

== Notable alumni ==
Cranbrook has many notable alumni, including designer Florence Knoll, former U.S. Senator Alan K. Simpson, Heisman Trophy winner Pete Dawkins, Pentagon Papers whistleblower Daniel Ellsberg, Utah Senator and 2012 presidential candidate Mitt Romney and his wife Ann Romney (née Davies), Senator Elissa Slotkin, columnist Michael Kinsley, Sun Microsystems founder Scott McNealy, co-founder of Pandora Radio Tim Westergren, former professional soccer player Alexi Lalas, Lisa Frank, actress and Tony award winner Renée Elise Goldsberry and actress Selma Blair.

== Athletics ==
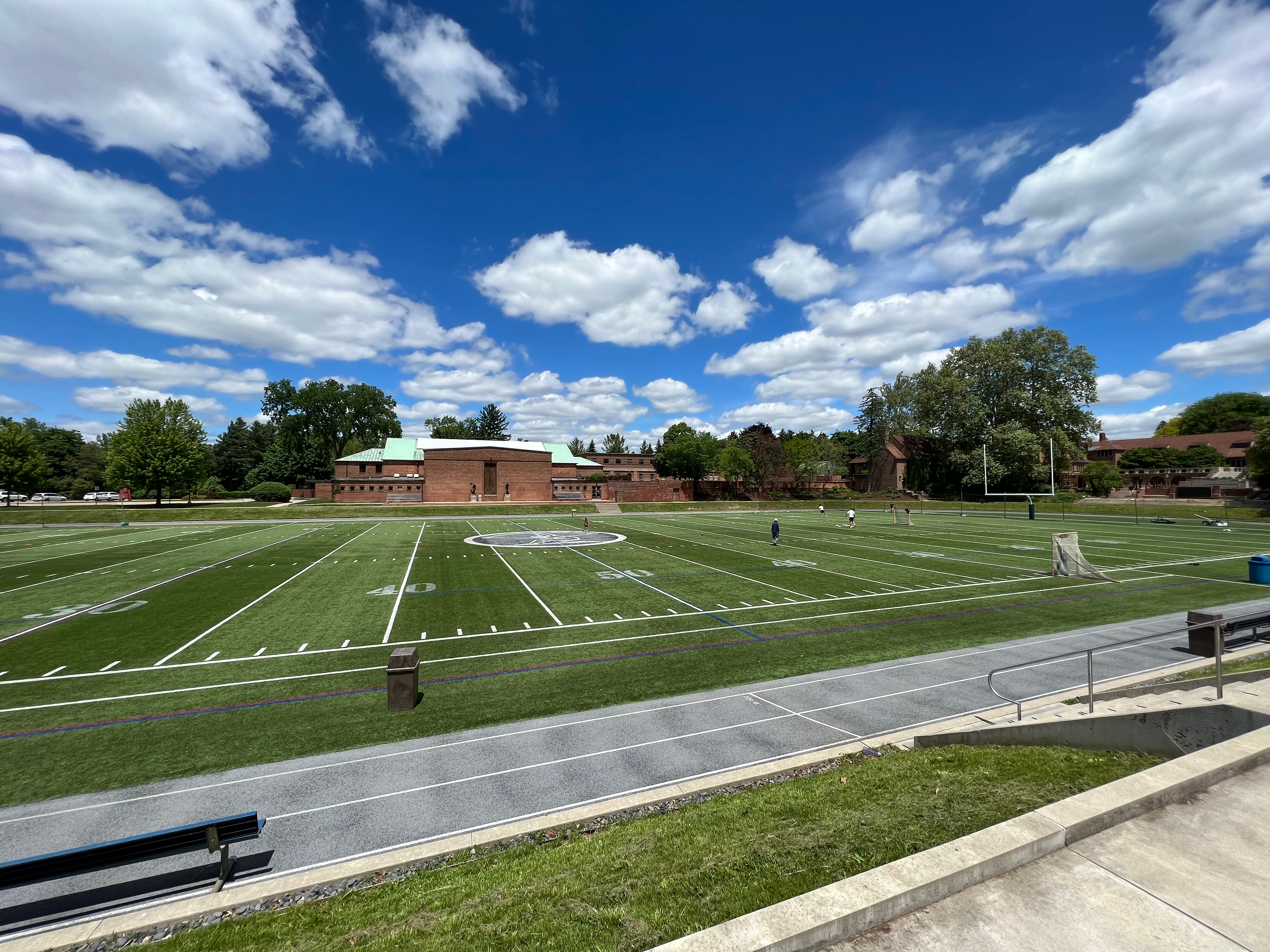
Cranbrook Athletic Field

Cranbrook Kingswood participates in MHSAA Division 3

Hockey-B	State Champions: 1979, 1983, 1985, 1986, 1987, 1988, 1991, 1997, 2000, 2001, 2004, 2006, 2007, 2009, 2010, 2013, 2015, 2021, 2024
Hockey-G	State Champions: 1998, 2002, 2005, 2010, 2013
Lacrosse-B	State Champions: 1980, 1981, 1982, 1984, 1987, 1991, 1995, 2006, 2013, 2015
Lacrosse-G	State Champions: 2017, 2018 Midwest Champions: 2009
Tennis-B	State Champions: 1972, 1973, 1980, 1981, 1982, 1983, 1984, 1985, 1987, 1988, 1989, 1990, 1991, 1992, 1993, 1994, 2008, 2010, 2015, 2016, 2017, 2018, 2020, 2021, 2023, 2025
Tennis-G	State Champions: 1979, 1980, 1981, 1982, 1988, 1989, 1990, 1991, 1999, 2004, 2008, 2011, 2012, 2013, 2014, 2015, 2022, 2023
Golf-B	State Champions: 1980, 1997, 1999, 2012, 2014
Golf-G	State Champions: 2001, 2006, 2021
Track and Field-B	State Champions: 1966, 1972
Swimming & Diving-B	State Champions: 2014, 2015, 2016, 2017, 2023, 2024
Swimming & Diving-G	State Champions: 2011, 2012, 2017, 2020

== Gallery ==
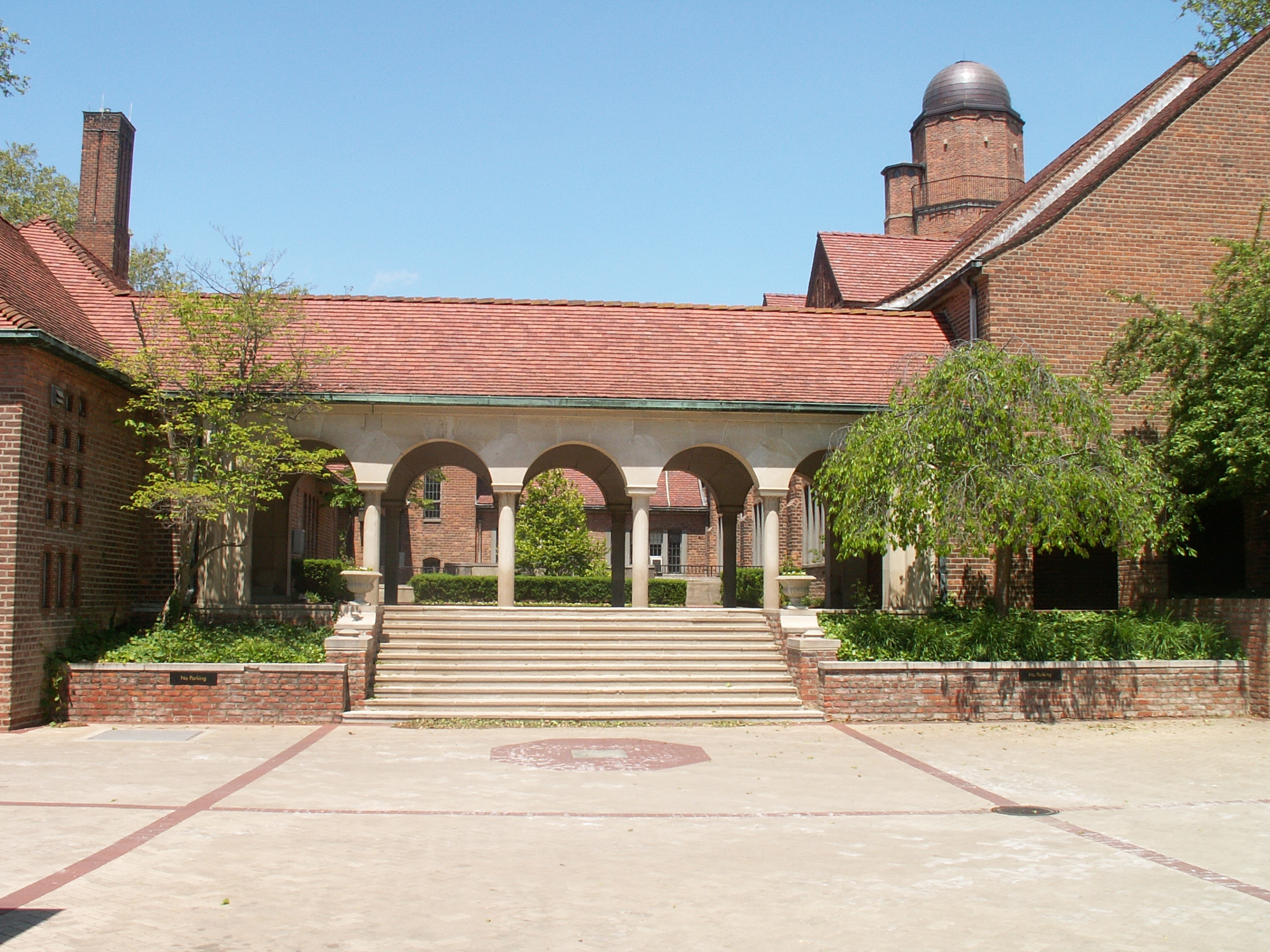
Covered walkway

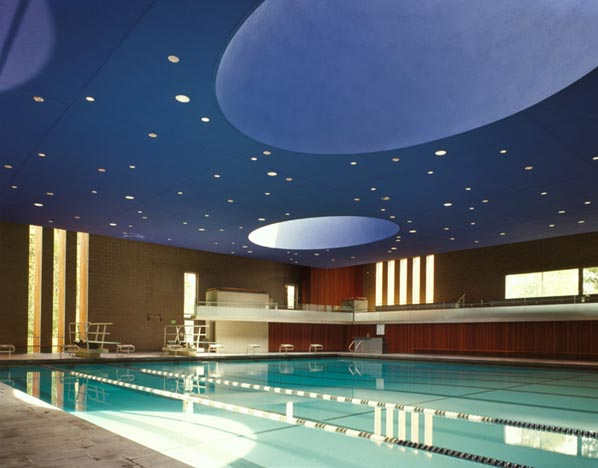
Natatorium

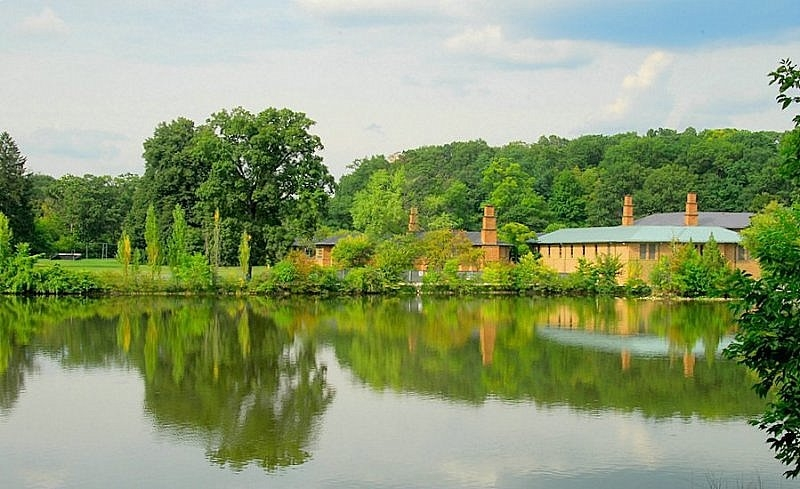
Kingswood School Building

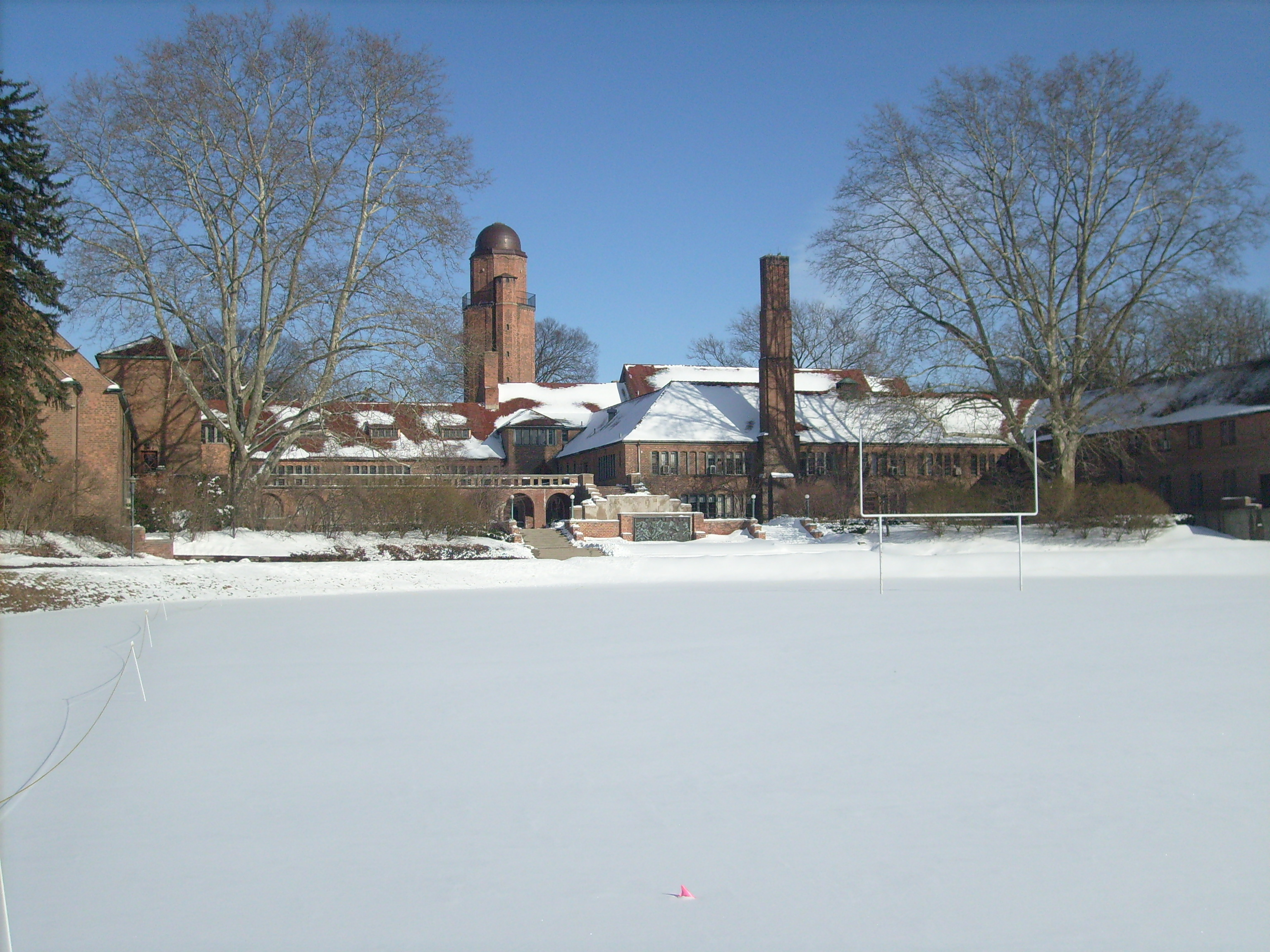
The school seen from a football field in winter

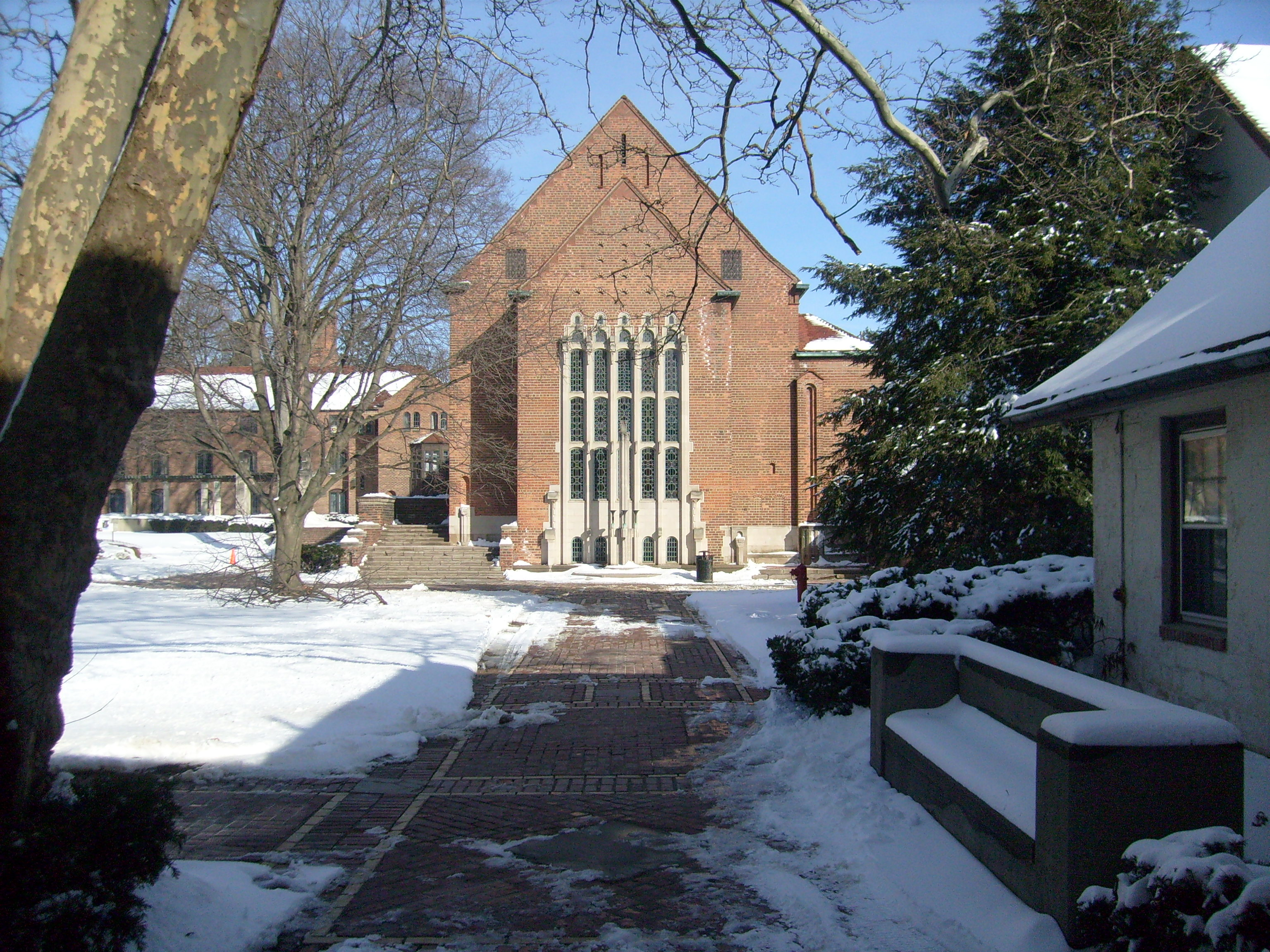
Dining Hall

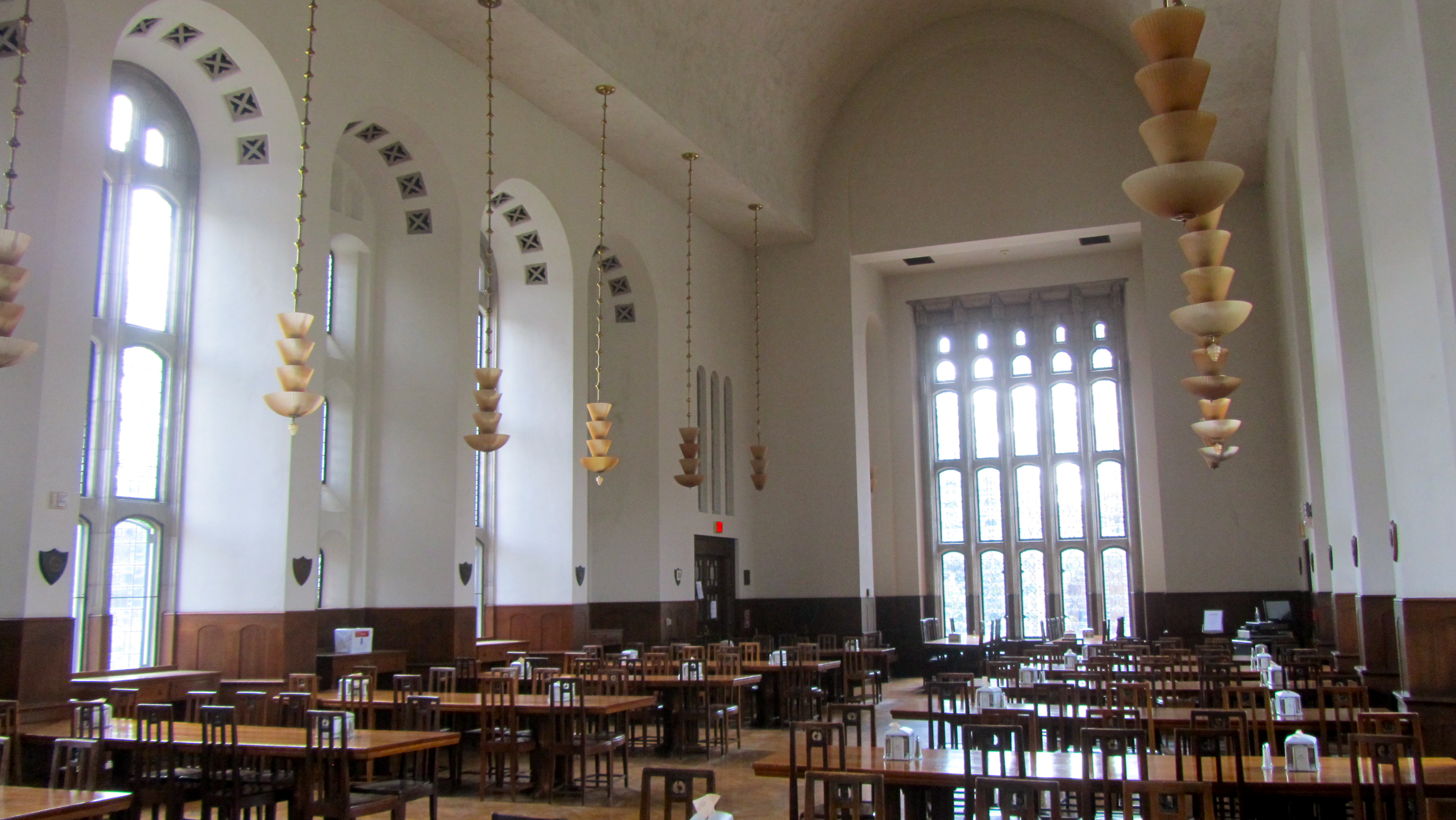
Dining Hall

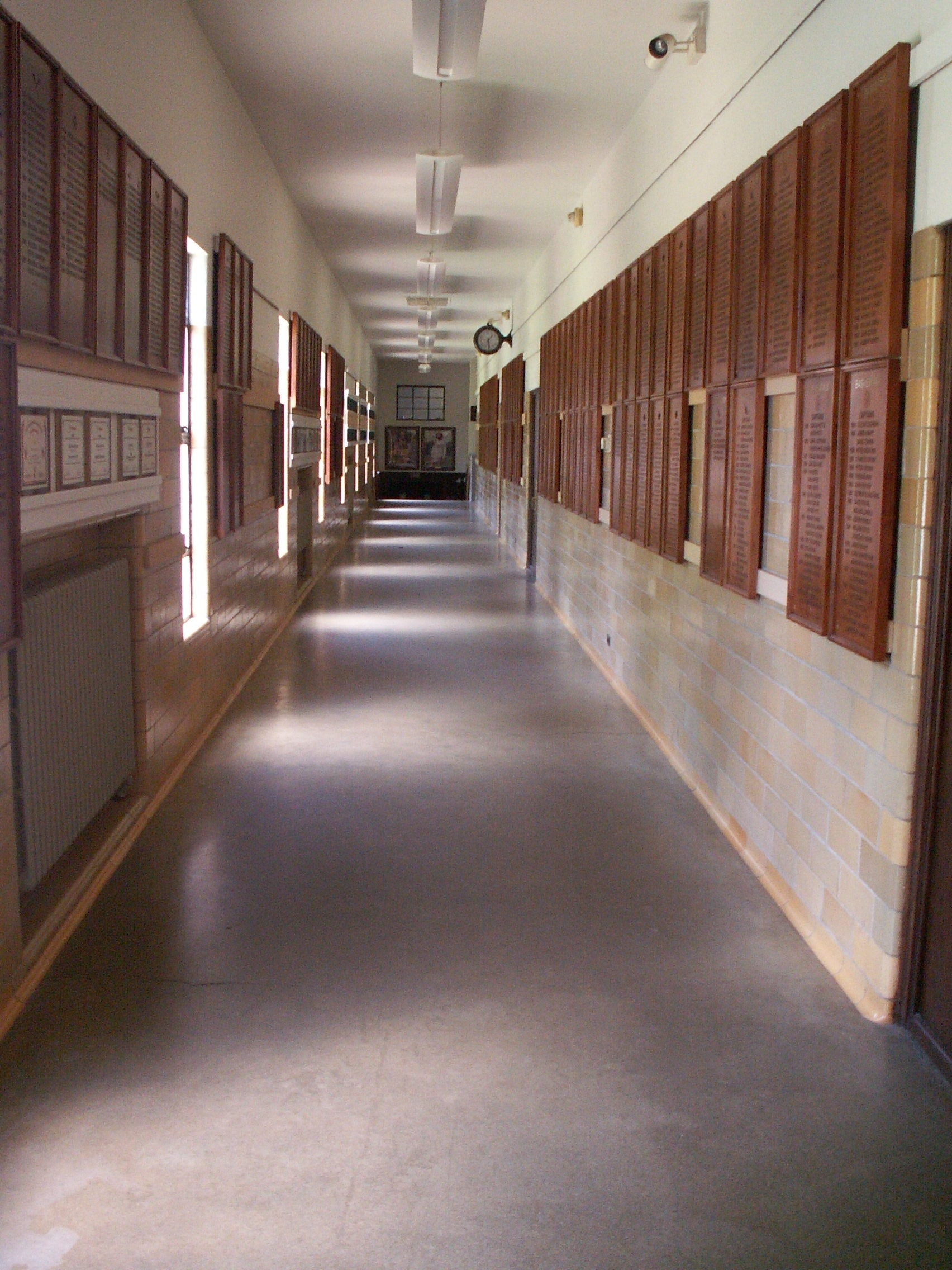
Hallway to Keppel Gymnasium

== See also ==
- Cranbrook Educational Community
- Architecture of metropolitan Detroit
- Interlochen Center for the Arts – Non-profit corporation in Green Lake Township, Michigan
