= Ruth Adler Schnee =

Textile designer and interior designer (1923–2023)

- Born: Ruth Adler; May 13, 1923; Frankfurt, Hesse-Nassau, Prussia, Weimar Republic
- Died: January 5, 2023 (aged 99); Colorado, U.S.
- Education: Harvard University; Rhode Island School of Design, Cranbrook Academy of Art
- Known for: Contemporary textile design
- Style: Mid-Century Modern
- Spouse: Edward Schnee

Ruth Adler Schnee (née Adler; May 13, 1923 – January 5, 2023) was a German-born American textile designer and interior designer based in Michigan. Schnee was best known for her modern prints and abstract-patterns of organic and geometric forms. She opened the Ruth Adler-Schnee Design Studio with her spouse Edward Schnee in Detroit, which operated until 1960. The studio produced textiles and later branched off into Adler-Schnee Associates home decor, interiors, and furniture.

== Biography ==
Ruth Adler was born on May 13, 1923, in Frankfurt, Weimar Republic Germany, to the German Jewish family of Marie and Joseph Adler. The family later moved to Düsseldorf. In 1937, when she was 14, she went to the Degenerate Art Exhibition, This exhibit was designed by the Nazis to be a criticism of modern art, but it inspired Adler Schnee, particularly the vivid colors of Wassily Kandinsky's paintings. She and her family fled Germany shortly after Kristallnacht in 1938 and before the start of World War II.

They moved to Detroit, where Adler Schnee graduated from Cass Technical High School in 1942. In 1944, she studied under Walter Gropius at Harvard University, after receiving a fellowship to the Harvard University Graduate School of Architecture and Design. In 1945, she received a bachelor of fine arts degree from Rhode Island School of Design. Adler Schnee interned with Raymond Loewy in New York City and she received a master of fine arts degree from Cranbrook Academy of Art in 1946, becoming one of the first woman to graduate from the school. She also won a Chicago Tribune residential design competition in 1946. She studied architecture with Eliel Saarinen at Cranbrook and it was here she became interested in textile design.

In 1948, she married Edward Schnee, a Yale University graduate in economics and he helped her grow her business. Together they opened the Adler Schnee home store in Detroit.

In 1952, Adler Schnee worked with Buckminster Fuller on the Ford Rotunda by contributing drapery. Her work was also included in the General Motors Technical Center designed by Eero Saarinen and Minoru Yamasaki's World Trade Center (1973–2001) in New York.

Adler Schnee was the subject of a 2010 documentary, The Radiant Sun: Designer Ruth Adler Schnee directed by Terri Sarris of the University of Michigan.

Adler Schnee was awarded The Kresge Foundation's 2015 Kresge Eminent Artist Award for lifetime achievement in her introduction of post-war modernism to the Detroit area.

Adler Schnee died on January 5, 2023, at the age of 99.

== Design aesthetic and textiles ==
The Chicago Tribune Design for Better Living competition that she won was to design a modern house. Adler Schnee's design was a box of glass and steel, with large windows. Needing draperies for the windows, she sketched out, on the spur of the moment, an abstract pattern. An architectural firm contacted her, wanting to purchase such draperies, but they didn't actually exist. She learned how to silk screen, but it was only after she met her husband that she was able expand her printing operation. At this time, textiles were changing from simply decoration to a way of expressing modern design. She was inspired in her textile design by the natural world (Seedy Weeds, 1953) and the built world (Construction, 1950). As a part of their partnership, her husband named all of her textiles. They started their store, Adler Schnee, shortly after their marriage. It featured Adler Schnee's bold, modern textiles and furniture designed by their friends, Charles and Ray Eames, Florence Knoll, Eero Saarinen, and more. Later, they also showcased and sold items from Scandinavian design firms such as Dansk, Marimekko, and Orrefors.

== Exhibitions/museum collections ==
Midcentury modernism started its revival in the early 1990s, and Adler Schnee's work was featured in retrospective shows, including:

- Design 1935–1965: What Modern Was, touring exhibition, 1991-1992
- Designing Home: Jews and Midcentury Modernism, Contemporary Jewish Museum in San Francisco, April 4 - October 14, 2014.

Her work can be found in the permanent collections of the Art Institute of Chicago and The Henry Ford Museum (Dearborn, Michigan).

The Cranbrook Center for Collections and Research holds the Edward and Ruth Adler Schnee Papers, acquired in 2010. The Cranbrook Art Museum received a large collection of her textiles in 2021 from Adler Schnee and her husband.

== Awards ==
- Condé Nast Prix de Paris prize, 1946
- American Institute of Decorators Award for Printed Textiles, 1947, 1948, 1957, 1958
- House and Garden Magazine Award, 1948
- Chicago Tribune Design for Better Living Award, 1948
- Awarded the key to the city of Detroit, 1976
- International Color Award from the American Institute of Architects, 1979
- International Lighting Design Award from the Illuminating Engineering Society of North America, 1985
- Women in Arts Award for lifetime contribution to the arts, 2002
- Kresge Eminent Artist for lifetime achievement by the Kresge Foundation, 2015
