= Greenwood Cemetery (Birmingham, Michigan) =

Cemetery in Birmingham, Michigan

Coordinates: 42.5538°N 83.2237°W

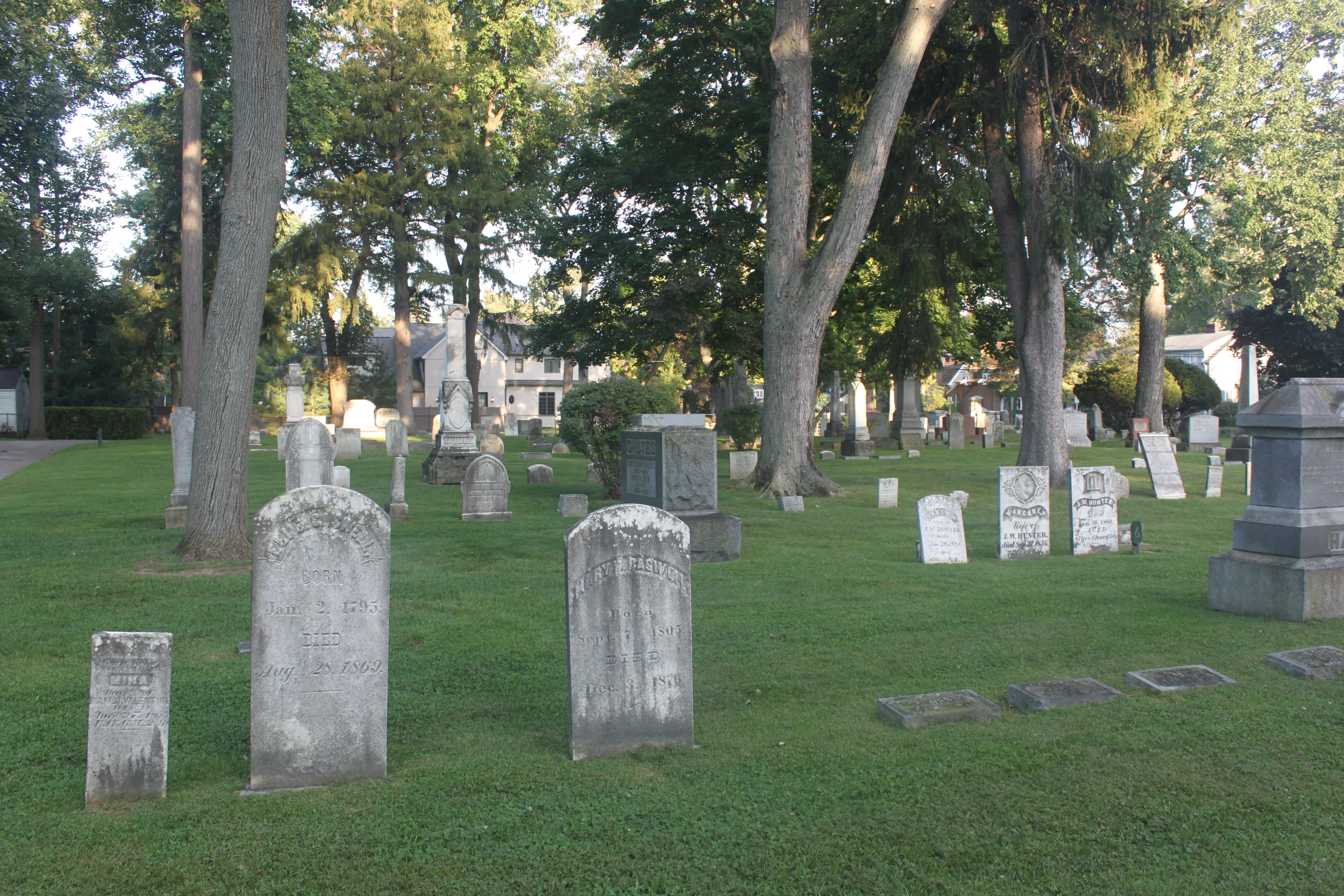
- Some Grave Markers at the Greenwood Cemetery
- Interactive map of Greenwood Cemetery

Details
- Location: Oak Avenue, Birmingham, Michigan
- Size: 7.9 acres (3.2 ha)
- No. of graves: Over 3,000

Greenwood Cemetery occupies 7.9 acres (32,000 m^{2}) on Oak Avenue between Greenwood and Lake Streets, west of Old Woodward Avenue, in Birmingham, Michigan. The gently rolling landscape contains over 3,000 graves; 650 date from the nineteenth century. The grounds display a plethora of limestone, marble, cast zinc and granite monuments. An iron fence with low stone piers flanking the entrance fronts the cemetery. In 1885 the Greenwood Cemetery Association was established to maintain the burial ground. When the Association was dissolved in 1946, the city of Birmingham assumed the ownership and maintenance of the cemetery.

== History ==
The oldest section of Greenwood Cemetery comprises land purchased from the federal government by Dr. Ziba Swan of Albany, New York, in 1821. The first interments on this one-half-acre parcel, set aside by Swan for a cemetery, occurred in 1825, when Polly Utter and her daughter Cynthia were murdered by Imri Fish, a mentally ill War of 1812 veteran who was boarding with the family.

Twenty-one years later twenty-one local citizens, including Dr. Ebenezer Raynale, a member of Michigan's first senate, purchased the cemetery property and an additional one and one-half acres from Swan. Martha Baldwin, founder of the Ladies' Library Association, organized local women into a group that in 1885 incorporated as the Greenwood Cemetery Association. Between 1846 and 1904 the cemetery was enlarged three times, increasing in size to 8 acres (32,000 m^{2}). In 1946 the city of Birmingham took over the operation of the cemetery. Side Two was created in 1825 on the property of Dr. Ziba Swan.

== Notable interments ==
Greenwood Cemetery contains the remains of some of Oakland County's earliest pioneers and most prominent citizens. Birmingham's only American Revolutionary War veteran, John Daniels, was buried here in 1832. He had moved to Michigan with his wife when he was in his 80s. Dr. Swan was interred in 1847.

Additional interments include:

- Will Carlton – Michigan's poet laureate and graduate of Hillsdale College
- Michigan State Senator Ebenezer Raynale (1881);
- Martha Baldwin (1913) – social activist; founder of library in Birmingham & Greenwood Cemetery Association;
- Edwin Baldwin – father of Martha, monument in shape of a tree trunk, symbolizing "head of the family;" Baldwin Avenue named for him.
- Birmingham Eccentric publishers George Mitchell (1929) and Almeron Whitehead (1926);
- U.S. Congressman Rowland E. Trowbridge (1881);
- George Gough Booth (1949) and Ellen Scripps Booth (1948), who established the Cranbrook Educational Community;
- Pewabic Pottery founder Mary Chase Perry Stratton (1961) and her husband William Buck Stratton (1938).
- John West Hunter (1880) — buried next to first wife Margaret (1856), second wife Sarah (1871), and youngest daughter Mary (1846); first settler to live in Birmingham (early 1819); farmer; businessman; foundry owner; he is referred to as Birmingham's first commuter because he lived in the town and worked in Detroit.
- Elijah Willets — tavern Owner; farmer; first land owner in Birmingham (Dec. 2, 1818).
- Ziba Sawn (original monument stolen) — Doctor; provider of first half acre of land for cemetery (1825); associate judge on Circuit Court of Oakland County (1839–1847); Mason.
- Olive Hamilton — sister of Margaret Hunter and wife of John Hamilton, second land owner in Birmingham; National Hotel founder; goods & people transporter. John Hamilton is buried in Flint, Michigan.
- Henry M. Benedict — sexton of Greenwood, appointed by Martha Baldwin; died hours after he became trapped between a newly dug grave & a cement vault.
- Harry Allen & Marion Clizbe Allen — First Mayor of the City of Birmingham and his wife; built house on land that was a part of Elijah Willet's first quarter section and on the site of first public school in Birmingham (now site of Birmingham Historical Museum and Park).
- Marshall Fredericks — His grave marker is his Leaping Gazelle, his first commissioned work. Sculptor of numerous works, including: The Spirit of Detroit, Cross in the Woods, Indian River, Michigan, and Freedom of the Human Spirit in Shain Park, Birmingham, Michigan.

== Sources ==
- Michigan State Historical Preservation Objects website, "Greenwood Cemetery," accessed at MI State Historic Preservation Objects
- Birmingham Historical Museum & Park » School & Group Tours » Tour of Greenwood Cemetery, accessed at Birmingham, MI : Tour of Greenwood Cemetery
