= Ellen Scripps Booth =

American businessperson and philanthropist

Ellen Warren Scripps Booth (1863–1948) was an American businesswoman and philanthropist.

== Biography ==
Scripps was born on December 10, 1863, to her parents James E. Scripps, and Harriet Josephine Messinger. She graduated from Capitol Union High School in Detroit, and did editorial work for The Detroit Evening News and Detroit Tribune, both papers owned by her father. Scripps married George Gough Booth in 1887, and the couple had five children together.

Scripps was active in the volunteer world, supporting the Children's Aid Society, Volunteers of America, the Young Women's Christian Association, the Detroit Institute of Arts, Hutzel Women's Hospital, American Red Cross, and others. Scripps played a role in the building and establishment of Cranbrook Schools, and often advised George Booth on art purchases. She was director of the Evening News Association, and one of the richest women in Michigan.
