= Ebenezer Raynale =

American politician

Member of the Michigan Senate from the 5th district
- In office November 2, 1835 – December 31, 1837

Personal details
- Born: October 21, 1804 Hartland, Vermont, US
- Died: March 24, 1881 (aged 76) Birmingham, Michigan, US
- Party: Democratic

Ebenezer Raynale (October 21, 1804 – March 24, 1881) was an American medical doctor and politician. He served two terms in the Michigan Senate following the adoption of the first state constitution.

== Biography ==
Ebenezer Raynale was born in Hartland, Vermont, on October 21, 1804, the son of Ebenezer and Mary Raynale. His father, who died the month before Raynale was born, was a farmer, teacher, and surveyor. When Raynale was three, his mother moved him and his sister Harriet to Brooklyn, Pennsylvania, where she remarried a year later, to Jonathan Sabin. The family moved several more times, to Ovid, New York, Reading, New York, and then in 1819 to Cambria, New York, where they lived until Raynale was 19 years old. He returned to Brooklyn, Pennsylvania, for four years to study medicine, with one more year of study back in Cambria, before he was licensed to practice medicine and surgery in New York.

In May 1828, he sailed on the steamboat Henry Clay from Buffalo to Detroit, then settled in Franklin, Michigan, and began practicing medicine. At the time, he was the only medical doctor in Southfield Township. He developed a reputation for sacrificing his own comfort in order to help the poor; he once got lost for an entire day and night in a snow storm after visiting a poor patient in the country, and his bill was just $3.

He served as the postmaster of Franklin for seven years after establishing the post office in the winter of 1828–1829. He built a sawmill in 1831 but sold it soon after. In 1835, he was chosen as a delegate to the state constitutional convention, and in October he was elected as a Democrat to a seat in the first session of the Michigan Senate, and was re-elected in 1837. He became violently ill during a session of the senate in Detroit, and his fellow senators put him in a bed in a covered wagon to go home, believing he was about to die. He recovered, and in the end was the last surviving member of the first session of the senate.

Following his time in the state senate, he moved to a farm in Bloomfield Township, and in 1839 he resumed practicing medicine after moving to Birmingham, Michigan. He was again chosen as a delegate to the state constitutional convention in 1850.

Raynale was one of a group of 21 citizens who in 1846 purchased the property of Greenwood Cemetery in Birmingham and expanded it two four times its previous size. He died in Birmingham on March 24, 1881.

=== Family ===
Raynale married Eliza Cassidy, of Springville, Pennsylvania, in October 1830. They had one child who died in infancy and four who lived to adulthood: Harriet E., Spencer B., Mary E., and Dr. Charles M. Raynale, who later took over his father's medical practice.
