= Madonna and Child (Cima, Detroit) =

1499-1502 oil on panel painting by Cima da Conegliano

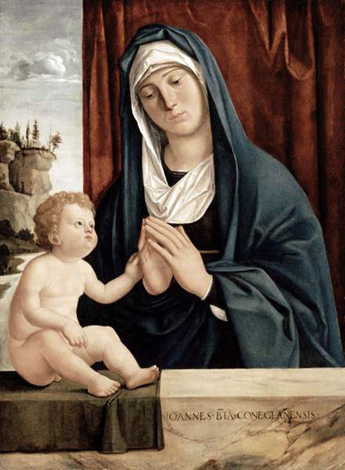
Madonna and Child (1499–1502) by Cima da Conegliano

Madonna and Child is a 1499–1502 oil on panel painting by Giovanni Battista Cima (1459-1517), now in the Detroit Institute of Arts, to which it was given in 1889 by James E. Scripps, having been in Scottish and English collections since around 1842.

The painting is on a 25&3/8 inch by 18&7/8 inch (64.5 × 47.9 cm) wood panel. It is mounted on a 33&1/8 inch by 26&7/8inch by 2&3/8 inche (84.1 cm × 68.3 cm × 6 cm) frame.
