= Marjorie Kreilick =

American sculptor, mosaicist and educator

Marjorie Kreilick (November 8, 1925 - July 5, 2023) was an American sculptor, mosaicist, and educator based in Madison, Wisconsin. She was sometimes known as Marjorie Kreilick McNab after her marriage. Over the course of her career, she created more than fifteen large-scale mosaics, including a series of ten mosaics for the Wisconsin State Office Building in Milwaukee completed in 1963. A longtime professor at the University of Wisconsin Madison, where she taught for 38 years, Kreilick was the first professionally trained woman artist appointed to the university's Department of Art faculty. Her work integrated modernist architectural theory with traditional mosaic practices, reflecting her studies both under sculptor Erwin Frey and at Cranbrook Academy of Art, and her training in Rome with Italian mosaicists. She was a recipient of the Rome Prize and has works in private museum collections across the United States.

== Early life and education ==
Marjorie Kreilick was born November 8, 1925 in Oak Harbor, Ohio, the daughter of Roland and Luella (Smith) Kreilick.

In 1943, Kreilick enrolled at Ohio State University in Columbus, Ohio, earning her Bachelor of Arts in 1946 and her Master of Arts in 1947. During her time at Ohio State, Kreilick studied sculpture under Erwin Frey.

Following graduation, Kreilick served as an instructor in sculpture at the Toledo Museum of Art from 1948 to 1951. During this period, Kreilick developed a greater interest in the potentialities of mosaic art, influenced in part by Toledo's prominent glass manufacturing industry.

From 1951 to 1952, Kreilick pursued further study at the Cranbook Academy of Art in Bloomfield, Michigan. There, Kreilick specialized in sculpture and was exposed to modernist architectural design theory.

== Career ==
=== UW-Madison ===
Encouraged to apply by American glass artist Harvey Littleton, Kreilick joined the University of Wisconsin Madison in 1953 as an instructor in the Department of Art Education, where she initially taught both painting and sculpture.

In 1957, Kreilick was promoted as full-time professor of sculpture, making her the first professionally-trained female artist in the faculty of the Art Department at UW Madison. University of Wisconsin-Madison campus historian Arthur Hove described Kreilick's artistic work as a form of scholarly exploration, combining both academic teaching and artistic practice.

Kreilick went on to develop a series of color theory courses that became foundational to the department's general art and graphic design programs, as well as spearheading a new course offering on Health Hazards in the Arts, spreading awareness of the safety concerns of materials and practices in art-making.

In 1991, Kreilick retired from University of Wisconsin-Madison and was conferred emerita status.

=== Rome ===
In 1956, Kreilick took a one-year sabbatical from the University of Wisconsin to study the Italian art of mosaic in Rome. There, she studied under and collaborated with Italian mosaicists, Giulio Giovanetti and the Meloni brothers.

Her interest in mosaic as a primary medium was further cultivated during this period. Later, Kreilick returned to Rome as a Fellow at the American Academy of Rome from 1961 to 1963.

=== Artworks ===
Kreilick designed a number of monumental mosaics for buildings across the Midwestern United States. In 1963, she completed her largest project: a series of ten mosaic murals for Wisconsin State Office Building in Milwaukee, Wisconsin.

She also created large-scale mosaic compositions for the Mayo Clinic in Rochester, Minnesota; the First National Building in Chicago, Illinois; Augustana University in Sioux Falls, South Dakota; and the Telfair Academy of Arts & Sciences in Savannah, Georgia.

In addition to these large-scale architectural compositions, Kreilick also created free-standing works now held in the collections of the Columbia Museum of Art in Columbia, South Carolina, the Joslyn Museum in Omaha, Nebraska, the Chazen Museum of Art in Madison, Wisconsin, the Racine Art Museum in Racine, Wisconsin, and the Museum of Wisconsin Art in West Bend, Wisconsin.

== Notable works ==
=== Wisconsin State Office Building ===
In 1963, Kreilick completed a series of ten mosaics for the Wisconsin State Office Building in Milwaukee, which houses the Governor office among other state departments. The project was commissioned by Wisconsin state architect, Karel Yasko, who engaged the architectural office of Grellinger and Rose, the Becker Construction Company, and Kreilick as artist in a collaborative effort.

During an initial planning meeting, the architects and contractors proposed the murals depict montages of dairy cows, breweries, and pulp mills character of Wisconsin's agriculture and industry. Kreilick rejected their proposal, instead noting: "Industries come and go...I wanted to show the state before man got here, to show the ecological areas and recognize some of the contributions that came from the indigenous Indians, the landscape before white man came. I wanted to do something that would be the essence of Wisconsin." The team unanimously accepted Kreilick's vision.

Each of the ten murals measures approximately 15 feet wide by 10 feet tall, each occupying one floor of the building. The series depicts landscapes representing Wisconsin's original geography. The lobby mosaic, Forward, named for the Wisconsin-state motto, is a non-representational abstraction representing dynamic movement, while the other nine murals depict the state's ecological divisions: namely, prairies, meadows, swamps, cranberry bogs, river groves, lake planes, coniferous forests, deciduous forests, and the cultivated fields.

All ten mosaic murals were constructed of Italian marble tesserae with gold smalti accents, executed at the Monticelli Studio in Rome. Across the ten murals, Kreilick employed over 65 different kinds of marble from the quarries of Carrara, Italy.

== Professional organizations ==
Marjorie Kreilick was an active member of a number of professional Art organizations, including the International Association of Contemporary Mosaicists, the National Society of Mural Painters, McKim & Morgan Society, the American Academy in Rome, the Arts Club, Pi Lamba Theta, and the College Art Association of America

== Awards and recognition ==
In 1963, Kreilick was awarded the prestigious Rome Prize (Prix de Rome) in painting, making her the second woman ever to receive the prize. In 1991, she retired from University of Wisconsin-Madison as a distinguished professor emerita.

== Legacy ==
In her later years, Kreilick established the Marjorie Kreilick Legacy Foundation Inc.

In 2021, the Archives of American Art at the Smithsonian in Washington D.C. acquired Kreilick's studio papers.
