= Institute for Aegean Prehistory Study Center for East Crete =

Organization in Greece

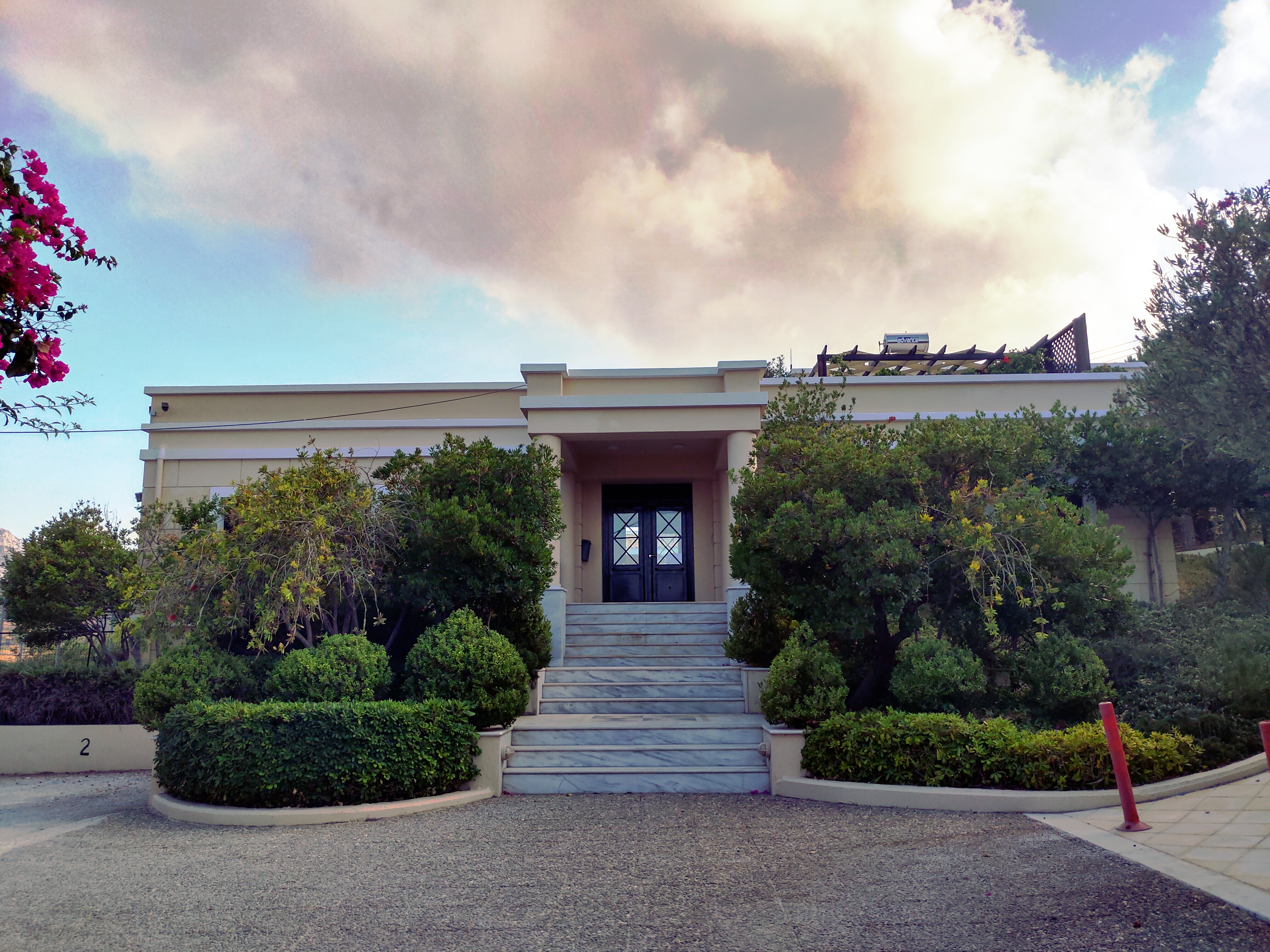

The Institute for Aegean Prehistory Study Center for East Crete (INSTAP-SCEC) is a research institution based at Pacheia Ammos in East Crete, Greece.

== General information, mission ==
INSTAP-SCEC was founded in 1997 as part of the Philadelphia-based Institute for Aegean Prehistory (INSTAP). Its primary object is the promotion and facilitation of archaeological research in the Aegean, with a special focus on the eastern part of Crete, where it supports American and Greek-American projects.

== Facilities, services ==
The Study Centre provides space for the storage of artefacts from excavations in the area, as well as extensive facilities, including laboratories, for their study. It also contains one of the most important archaeological libraries in Crete, organises a regular lecture series and offers internships for promising scholars in the field. Its contribution to Minoan archaeology is of immense importance.

== Archaeological fieldwork ==
The many important archaeological projects associated with INSTAP-SCEC include Mochlos, Pseira, Kavousi Vronda, Kavousi Kastro, Azoria, Chrysokamino, and Gournia.

== See also ==
- American School of Classical Studies at Athens
- List of Foreign Archaeological Institutes in Greece
- Malcolm H. Wiener
