= James E. Scripps =

American journalist (1835–1906)

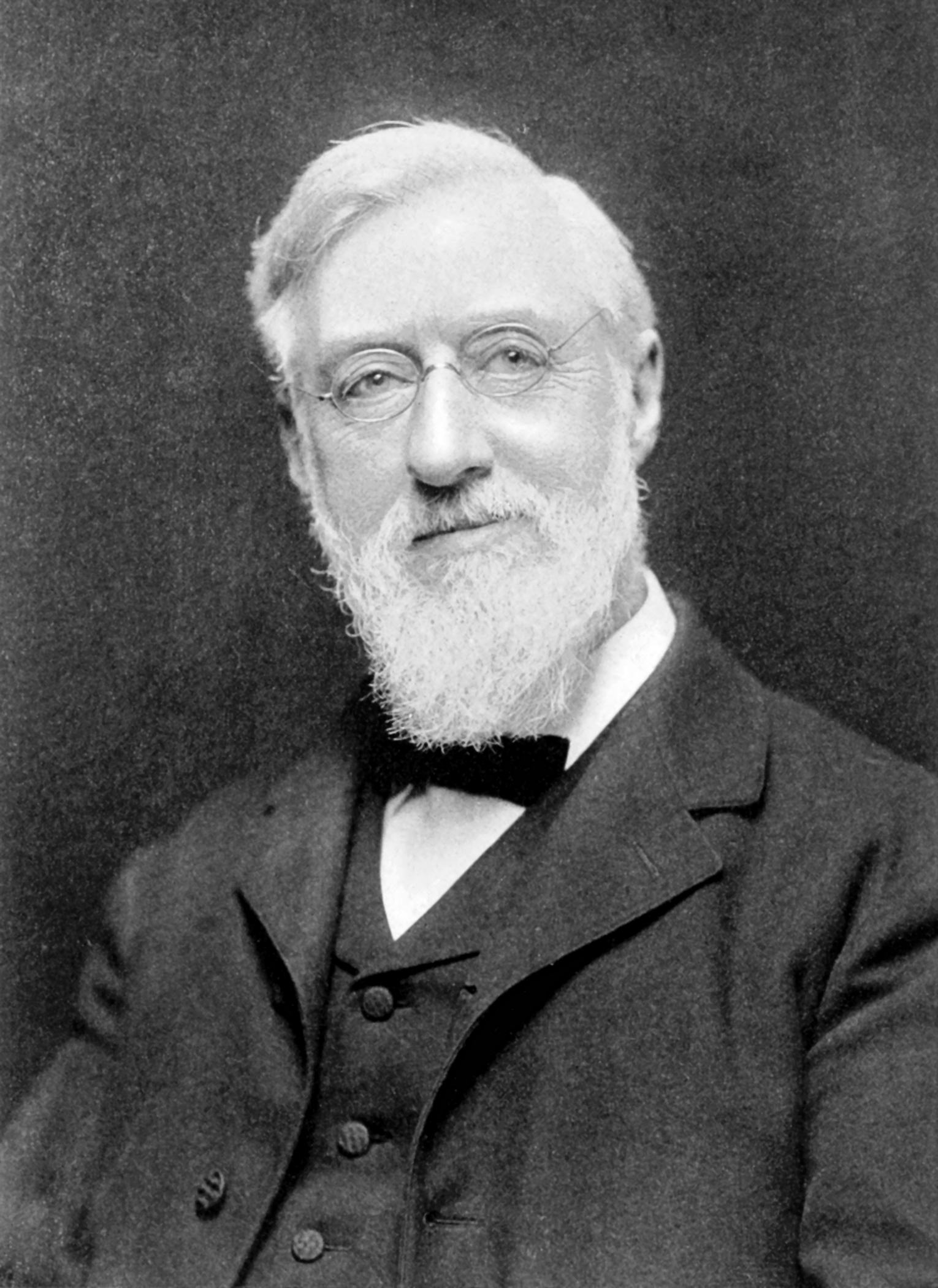
- Scripps in 1903
- Born: James Edmund Scripps; March 19, 1835; London, England
- Died: May 28, 1906 (aged 71)
- Resting place: Woodmere Cemetery, Detroit, Michigan, U.S.
- Occupations: Newspaper publisher; philanthropist
- Parent(s): James Mogg Scripps; Ellen Mary Saunders

James Edmund Scripps (March 19, 1835 – May 28, 1906) was an American newspaper publisher and philanthropist.

== Early life and education ==
Scripps was born in 1835 in London to James Mogg Scripps and Ellen Mary (Saunders) Scripps. His father was a bookbinder. After the death of Ellen Mary, his father immigrated to America in 1844 with their six motherless children. There he acquired land, and the boy Scripps grew up on a Rushville, Illinois, farm.

== Career ==
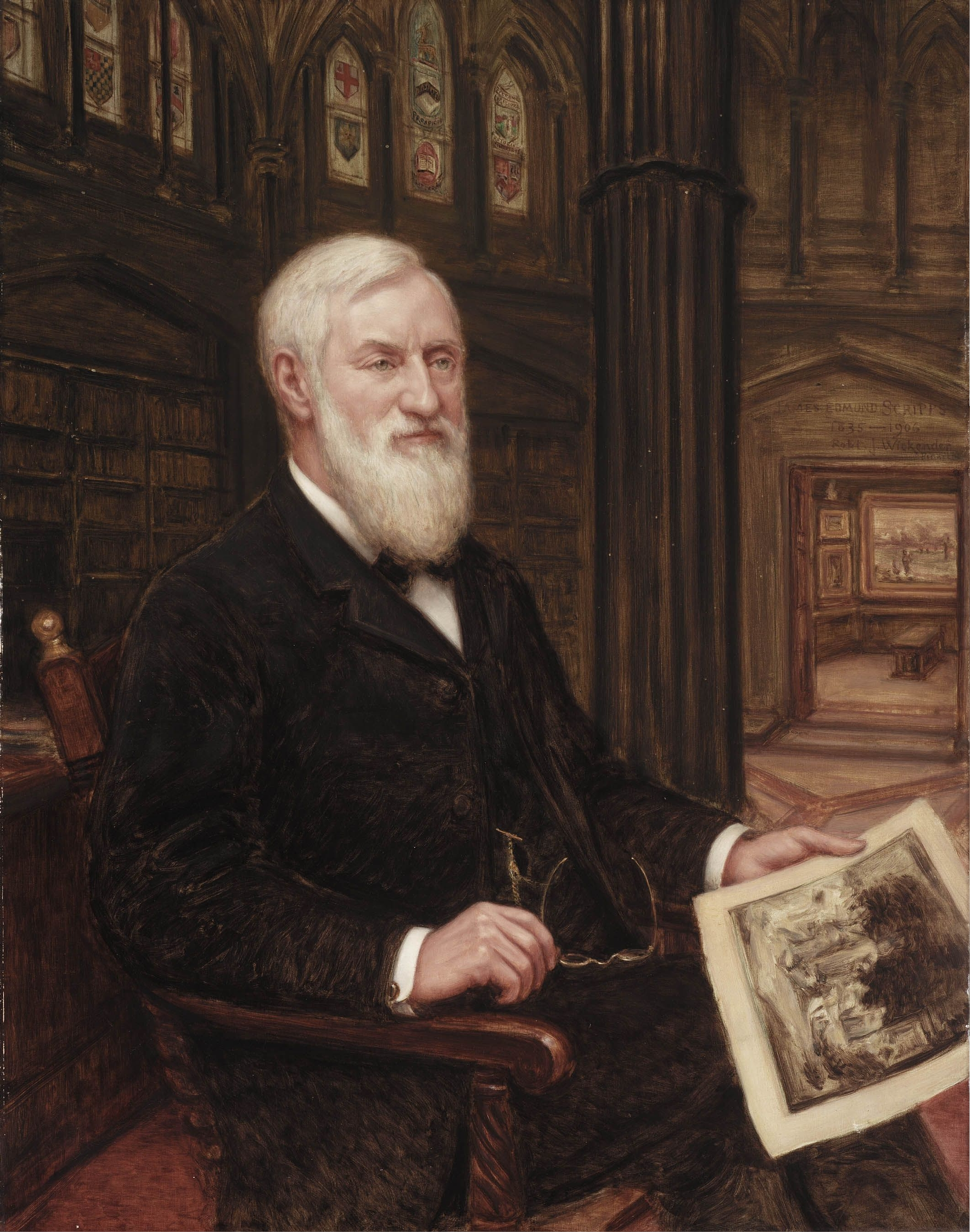
Portrait of James E. Scripps, 1907

By his early 20s, Scripps was working at the Chicago Tribune in 1857.

He moved to Detroit in 1859, where he again worked in the newspaper business. By 1862 he had become manager of the Detroit Tribune, and he later became part owner and manager of the Detroit Daily Advertiser.

When the Advertiser's premises burned in 1873, Scripps took his $20,000 insurance money and with it started his own newspaper. Scripps decided to tap the growing literate class of working men and women by launching a newspaper, The Evening News (later, The Detroit News). Running with an idea new for its time, he filled the paper with inexpensive advertising and instructed his reporters to write "like people talk". His competitors called the News "a cheap rag" and labeled his reporters "pirates", but Detroiters loved it.

Scripps later had an interest in E. W. Scripps Company with his younger half-brother, E. W. Scripps. They controlled newspapers located in Cleveland, St. Louis, Cincinnati and Chicago.

After a lengthy European acquisition tour, Scripps aided prominently in founding the Detroit Museum of Art (later, the Detroit Institute of Arts). In 1889 he presented it with a collection of old masters, such as Cima da Conegliano's Madonna and Child, costing $75,000 (in 1889 dollars). This was among the first major accessions of early paintings for any American museum. A catalogue of the collection was published in 1889 and has been digitized by the Research Library & Archives of the Detroit Institute of Arts.

In 1900, Scripps wrote a letter for the Detroit Century Box time capsule.

== Family life ==
Scripps's sister and one-time partner Ellen Browning Scripps was instrumental in helping establish their younger brother E. W. Scripps in the newspaper industry, resulting in the E.W. Scripps Company media conglomerate. She later became the founding donor of the Scripps Institute of Oceanography located in La Jolla, California and was the founder of Scripps College, located in Claremont.

Scripps's eldest daughter, Ellen Warren Scripps (1863–1948), married George Gough Booth. He joined the family business and subsequently became the publisher of the Evening News Association. With his brothers, he independently founded Booth Newspapers, now MLive Media Group. It was acquired by S.I. Newhouse's Advance Publications in 1976.

Together, George and "Nellie" also founded what became the world-renowned Cranbrook Educational Community in Bloomfield Hills, Michigan.

== Death ==
Scripps died in 1906 at the age of 71 years old and is buried in Detroit's Woodmere Cemetery.

== Books ==
- Five Months Abroad (1881)
- Memorials of the Scripps Family (1891)
- A Genealogical History of the Scripps Family and its Various Alliances (Detroit: privately printed, 1903)
- numerous pamphlets
