= Cranbrook Educational Community =

Educational complex in Bloomfield Hills, Michigan, U.S.

- Cranbrook
- U.S. National Register of Historic Places
- U.S. National Historic Landmark District
- Michigan State Historic Site
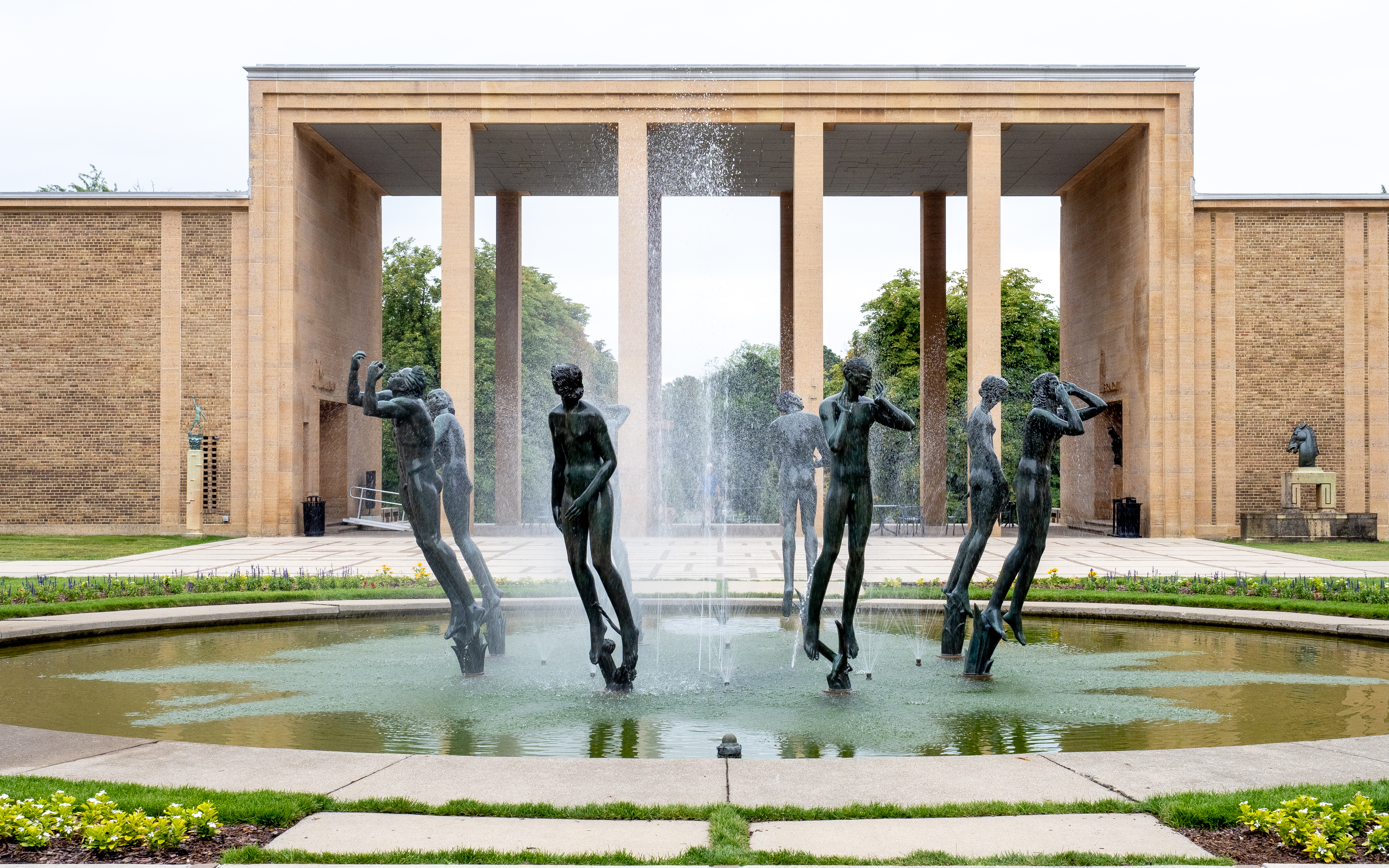
- Cranbrook Art Museum
- Interactive map
- Location: 39221 Woodward Avenue, Bloomfield Hills, Michigan, U.S.
- Coordinates: 42°34′3.4″N 83°14′36.9″W
- Built: 1926–99
- Architect: Eliel Saarinen
- Architectural style: 20th Century American
- NRHP reference No.: 73000954

Significant dates
- Added to NRHP: March 7, 1973
- Designated NHLD: June 29, 1989

The Cranbrook Educational Community is an education, research, and public museum complex in Bloomfield Hills, Michigan, United States. This National Historic Landmark was founded in the early 20th century by newspaper mogul George Gough Booth with his wife, Ellen Scripps Booth. It consists of Cranbrook Schools, Cranbrook Academy of Art, Cranbrook Art Museum, Cranbrook Institute of Science, Cranbrook House and Gardens, and the Cranbrook Center for Collections and Research. The founders also built Christ Church Cranbrook as a focal point for the educational complex, though it is a separate entity operated by the Episcopal Diocese of Michigan. The sprawling 319-acre (1,290,000 m^{2}) campus began as a 174-acre (700,000 m^{2}) farm, purchased in 1904. The organization takes its name from Cranbrook, England, the birthplace of the founder's father.

Cranbrook is renowned for its architecture in the Arts and Crafts and Art Deco styles. The chief architect was Eliel Saarinen while Albert Kahn was responsible for the design of Cranbrook House. Sculptors Carl Milles and Marshall Fredericks also spent many years in residence at Cranbrook.

In 2024 Cranbrook Educational Community was awarded 3 Michelin Stars in the Michelin Green Guide, on par with institutions such as the Detroit Institute of Art and the Louvre.

== Schools at Cranbrook ==
Cranbrook Schools comprise a co-educational day and boarding college preparatory "upper" school, a middle school, and Brookside Lower School.

In 1922, the Bloomfield Hills School was the first school to open on the Cranbrook grounds. Founded by George Booth and Ellen Scripps Booth, the Bloomfield Hills School was intended as the community school for local area children. The Bloomfield Hills School ultimately evolved into Brookside School. Following completion of the Bloomfield Hills School, The Booths looked forward to building Cranbrook School for Boys, an all-boys College-Preparatory school at which students from the Detroit area and abroad would come to reside. Booth wanted the Cranbrook School to possess an architecture reminiscent of the finest British boarding schools; he hired Finnish architect Eliel Saarinen to design the campus. Cranbrook's initial phase of building was completed in 1928.

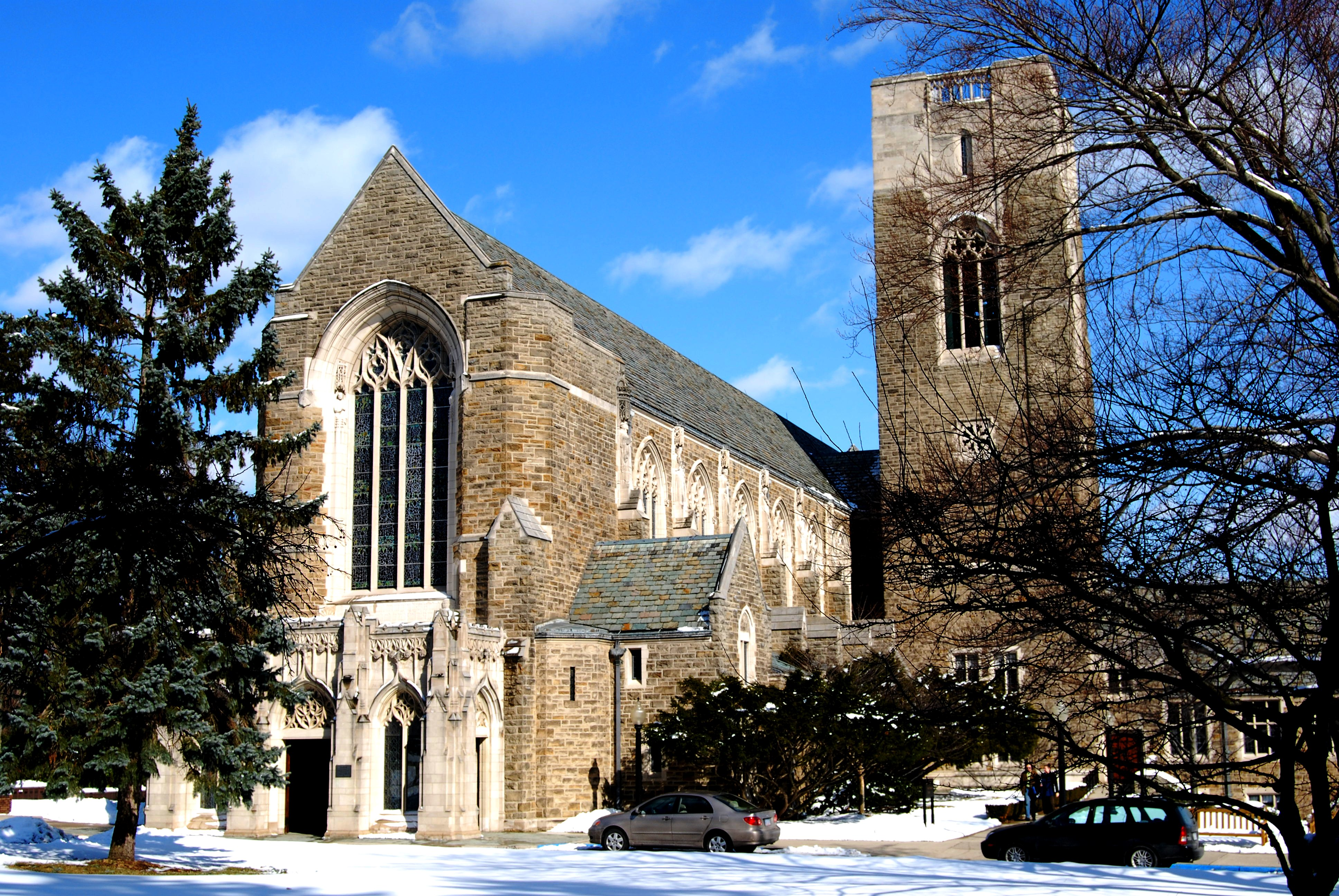
Christ Church Cranbrook (1925–1928), by architect Bertram Goodhue, with windows by Harry Wright Goodhue

Over the years, the Cranbrook School for Boys campus grew to include Stevens Hall, Page Hall, and Coulter Hall. While primarily functioning as only residential spaces, Page Hall featured a smoking lounge as well as a shooting range. Lerchen Gymnasium, Keppel Gymnasium, and Thompson Oval were also constructed on the campus. In the 1960s, Cranbrook School for Boys also constructed a state-of-the-art Science Building named the Gordon Science Center.

Realizing that young women would also need a place of their own to learn, Ellen Scripps Booth, Booth's wife, pressured Booth into building a school for girls. Scripps Booth supervised the project, which she named the Kingswood School Cranbrook. Unlike her husband, Scripps Booth encouraged Eliel Saarinen to come up with a unique interior design for the campus completely on his own. Instead of the several buildings that housed the Cranbrook School for Boys, the Kingswood School Cranbrook was contained within one building that included all necessary features, including dormitories, a dining hall, an auditorium, classrooms, a bowling alley, a ballroom, and lounges and common areas. The education at Kingswood School Cranbrook was initially viewed as a "finishing school", though that changed over time.

In 1986, the Cranbrook School for Boys and Kingswood School Cranbrook entered a joint agreement, renaming the new institution the Cranbrook Kingswood Upper School.

== Cranbrook Academy of Art ==
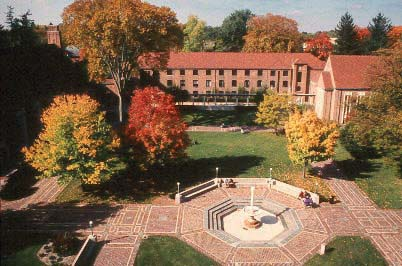
The Cranbrook School Quadrangle

The Cranbrook Academy of Art, a graduate school for architecture, art, and design, was founded by George Booth and Ellen Scripps Booth in 1932. In 1984, The New York Times wrote that "the effect of Cranbrook and its graduates and faculty on the physical environment of this country has been profound ... Cranbrook, surely more than any other institution, has a right to think of itself as synonymous with contemporary American design."

The buildings were designed and the school first headed by Eliel Saarinen, who integrated design practices and theories from the Arts and Crafts movement through the international style. The school retains its apprenticeship method of teaching, in which a small group of students—usually only 10 to 16 per class, or 150 students in total for the ten departments—study under a single artist-in-residence for the duration of their curriculum. There are no traditional courses; all learning is self-directed under the guidance and supervision of the respective artist-in-residence.

== Cranbrook Art Museum ==
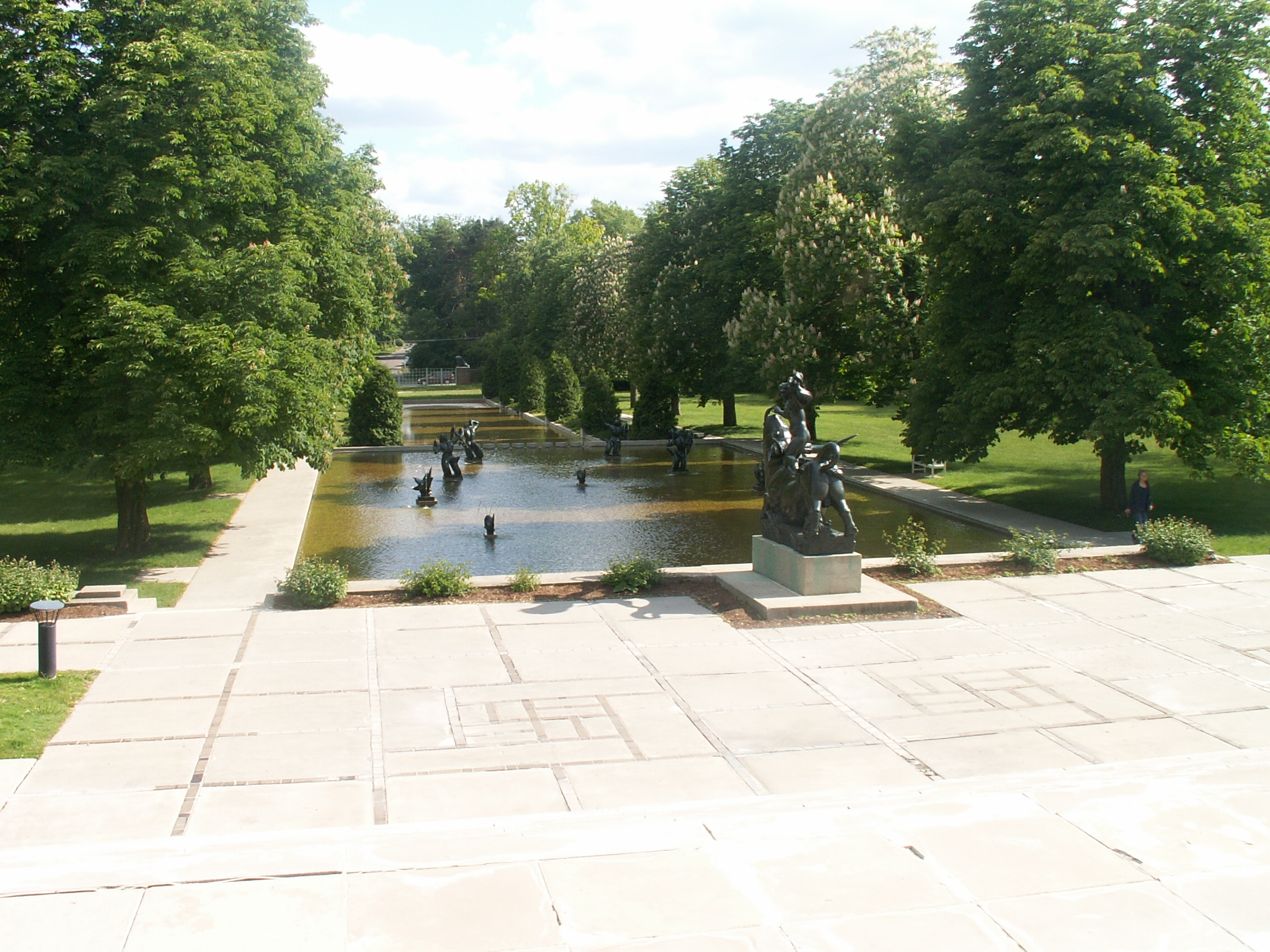
Cranbrook gardens

The Cranbrook Art Museum is a museum of contemporary art with a permanent collection, including works by Charles Eames, Ray Eames, Harry Bertoia, Maija Grotell, Carl Milles, Robert Motherwell, Andy Warhol, and Roy Lichtenstein. Completed in 1942 under the direction of architect Eliel Saarinen, the museum is housed in the same building as the Cranbrook Academy of Art.

The museum also offers tours of Saarinen House, which has undergone painstaking restoration beginning in 1977. The remaining areas of the house were completed between 1988 and 1994. The museum is accredited by the American Alliance of Museums.

Sculptor Carl Milles' numerous works in Metro Detroit include those at Cranbrook Educational Community, such as Mermaids & Tritons Fountain (1930), Sven Hedin on a Camel (1932), Jonah and the Whale Fountain (1932), Orpheus Fountain (1936), and Spirit of Transportation (1952), currently in Cobo Center.

In 2009, the museum closed for renovation and expansion, reopening in November 2011. The project restored aspects of the original building designed by Saarinen, made necessary structural repairs, replaced windows, and upgraded mechanical systems. The renovated museum features year-round, changing exhibitions and a new Collections and Education Wing—an additional 20,000 sq ft (1,900 m^{2}) of storage and classroom space open to visitors by guided tour. Based on an open storage plan, the new wing allows the museum's entire collection to be seen.

== Cranbrook Institute of Science ==
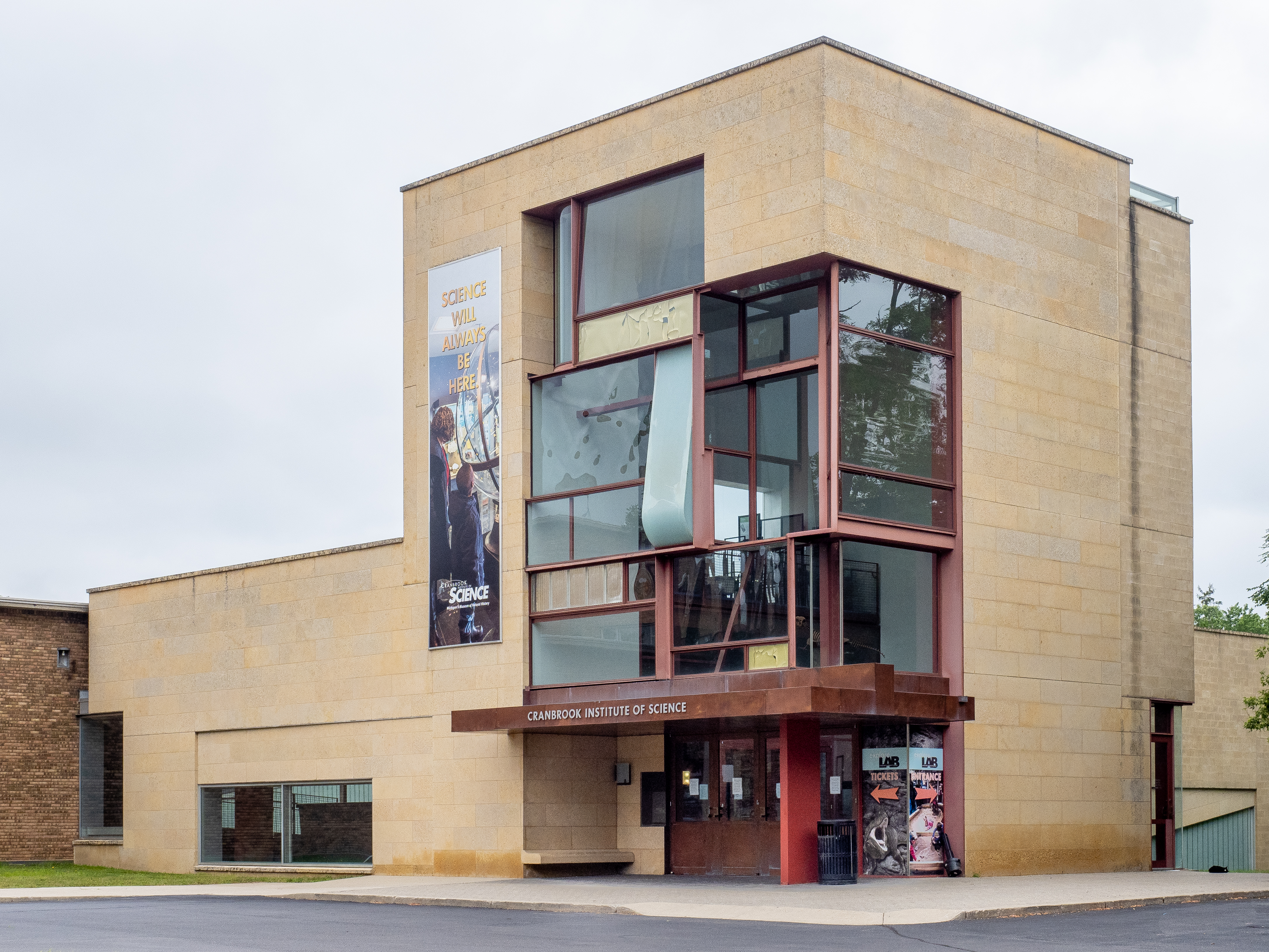
Cranbrook Institute of Science (2021)

The Cranbrook Institute of Science includes a permanent collection of exhibits from a variety of Disciplines including Earth, Space, and Life sciences. There are displays of temporary exhibits in museum's travelling hall that change every 3-9 months. It also features a planetarium and a powerful 20 inch telescope through which visitors may peer on selected nights.

The museum grounds feature a life-sized statue of a Stegosaurus.

From 1946 to 1970, the institute awarded the Mary Soper Pope Medal for notable achievement in plant sciences.

== Cranbrook House and Gardens ==
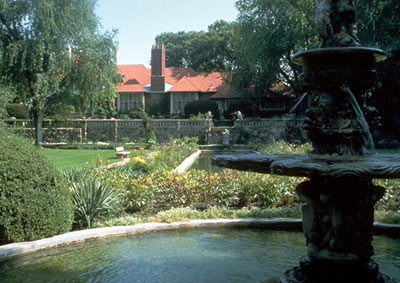
Cranbrook House and Gardens

Cranbrook House and Gardens are the centerpiece of the Cranbrook Educational Community campus. The 1908 English Arts and Crafts-style house was designed by Albert Kahn for Cranbrook founders George and Ellen Scripps Booth, and is roofed with Ludowici tile. Ten first-floor rooms can be seen on guided tours; the rooms contain tapestries, hand-carved woodworking, and English antiques in the Arts and Crafts style. The upper floors are used for the executive offices of the Cranbrook Educational Community.

Originally designed by George Booth, the 40-acre (160,000 m^{2}) gardens include a sunken garden, formal gardens, a bog garden, a herb garden, a wildflower garden, a Japanese garden, sculpture, fountains, specimen trees, and a lake.

Leonard Bernstein recalled composing portions of his Symphony No. 2, The Age of Anxiety, on the Cranbrook House Steinway concert grand piano while residing there in April 1946. Bernstein had come to Detroit at the request of Zoltan Sepeshy to conduct the Detroit Symphony Orchestra at Music Hall. While visiting, he requested studio space where he could compose, and Sepeshy had the piano moved from Cranbrook House into St. Dunstan's Playhouse.

The house and gardens are open to the public from May through October.

== St. Dunstan's Playhouse ==
St. Dunstan's Playhouse, while not formally a part of the Cranbrook Educational Community, is located on the Cranbrook grounds near the Cranbrook House. The Playhouse, a 206-seat theater, houses the St. Dunstan's Theatre Guild of Cranbrook. The guild was founded in 1932 by Henry Scripps Booth, the son of Cranbrook's founders George and Ellen Booth.

In the summer months, the St. Dunstan's Theatre Guild performs in the outdoor Greek Theatre adjacent to the Cranbrook House. The theater was restored in 1990–1991.

== Historic landmark ==
Fourteen buildings making up the Cranbrook complex were added to the National Register of Historic Places in 1973 and were further designated a National Historic Landmark District in 1989, cited as being "one of the most important groups of educational and architectural structures in America".

The contributing buildings are:

1. Brookside School Cranbrook
2. Buildings & Grounds Offices
3. Christ Church, Cranbrook
4. Cranbrook Academy of Art
5. Cranbrook Foundation Office
6. Cranbrook House & Gardens
7. Cranbrook Institute of Science
8. Cranbrook School
9. Cranbrook School Auditorium
10. Edison House
11. Faculty Housing
12. Greek Theater at St. Dunstan's
13. Kingswood School Cranbrook
14. Visitors Entrance

== See also ==
- Architecture of metropolitan Detroit
- List of Eye magazine issues – (No.3, Vol 1. Spring 1991)
- Tourism in metropolitan Detroit
- List of National Historic Landmarks in Michigan
- National Register of Historic Places listings in Oakland County, Michigan
