= George Gough Booth =

American newspaper publisher

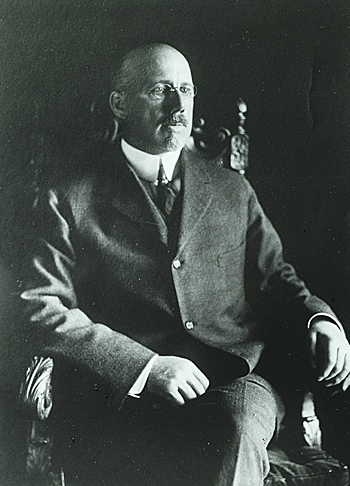
- Born: September 24, 1864; Toronto, Canada West
- Died: April 11, 1949 (aged 84); Detroit, Michigan
- Spouse: Ellen W. Scripps
- Children: 5
- Parent: Henry Wood Booth

George Gough Booth (September 24, 1864 – April 11, 1949) was the publisher of the privately held Evening News Association, a co-founder of Booth Newspapers (now MLive Media Group), and a philanthropist. Born in Canada, he made his career based in Detroit, Michigan and the region.

== Biography ==
He was born on September 24, 1864, in Toronto, Canada, to Henry Wood Booth and his wife. He had two brothers, with whom he later created a newspaper chain in southern Michigan.

Booth got his start in the newspaper industry after marrying Ellen W. Scripps, the eldest daughter of publisher James E. Scripps. His father-in- law was the older half-brother and one-time partner of E.W. Scripps. He had founded The Evening News in 1878 (later known as The Detroit News). James Scripps ultimately turned over business control of the newspaper to Booth.

With his two brothers, George Booth subsequently founded the independent Booth Newspapers (now MLive Media Group), a chain spanning the southern half of Michigan.

Booth died on April 11, 1949, in Detroit, Michigan. He was buried in Greenwood Cemetery in Birmingham, Michigan.

== Philanthropy ==
Booth and his wife, Ellen Scripps Booth, founded the Cranbrook Educational Community (CEC) in Bloomfield Hills, Michigan. It has become one of the nation's highest ranked private schools.

In 1904, the Booths purchased the site of the present-day CEC as a place for their summer home. They hired noted architect Albert Kahn to design their country manor, Cranbrook House. As their country estate grew both in purpose and in scale, Booth had both noted architect Eliel Saarinen and renowned sculptor Carl Milles in residence for many years at CEC.

Booth was an avid student of the Arts and Crafts movement. Together with his brother Ralph, the two men were major benefactors of the Detroit Institute of Arts.

== Legacy ==
Booth Newspapers (now MLive Media Group) was sold to Advance Publications, a Samuel I. Newhouse property, in 1976. Evening News Association was eventually sold to the Gannett Company in 1985. MediaNews Group currently owns The Detroit News.

== Family ==
Booth married Ellen Warren Scripps, the eldest daughter of James E. Scripps, in 1887. They had five children named James, Grace, Warren, Henry, and Florence. Their second son, Warren Scripps Booth (1894–1987), served as president of The Detroit News from 1952 to 1963. Their third son, Henry Scripps Booth (1897–1988), was a long-time trustee of the Cranbrook Foundation and an architect who collaborated on many Cranbrook buildings after studying under the noted architect Eliel Saarinen at the University of Michigan.

== See also ==
- William Morris Society
