= University of Minnesota Messenia Expedition =

1953–1975 archaeological project in Greece

Map of the southwest Peloponnese, Greece, showing the approximate area and key sites surveyed by the University of Minnesota Messenia Expedition

The University of Minnesota Messenia Expedition (UMME) was an archaeological expedition in Messenia, Greece, conducted between 1953 and 1975. It was devised and begun by William McDonald, who also served as its director for most of its duration.

The project had its origins in the decipherment of Linear B in the early 1950s, and the consequent realisation that the Linear B tablets unearthed at the site of Pylos in Messenia – where McDonald had excavated since 1939 – had been the centre of a Mycenaean polity that controlled sites across the region. In the early 1950s, McDonald, soon joined by Richard Hope Simpson, carried out field surveys to match the toponyms given in the Linear B tablets from the Palace of Nestor at Pylos to then-undiscovered archaeological sites in Messenia. Throughout the 1950s and 1960s, the project expanded to survey 3,800 square kilometres (1,500 sq mi) of territory, gathering records of habitation from the Neolithic to the Medieval periods.

The UMME's work established Messenia as one of the best-studied regions of Mycenaean Greece, and has been cited as an inspiration for numerous other archaeological projects in Greece. Its distinctive methods included the involvement of specialists in scientific fields, such as geologists and botanists, as well as its diachronic perspective, including the study of the modern human geography and anthropological investigation as a means of generating hypotheses about the ancient exploitation and habitation of the region.

Between 1969 and 1975, the expedition carried out the excavation of Nichoria, a Mycenaean and Early Iron Age site in southern Messenia, which proved a significant source of information about the end of the Bronze Age in Greece, as well as a proving ground and case study for the use of scientific, multi-disciplinary methods in archaeological excavation. Animal bone remains found at the site have become significant in reconstructing the diets of people in Mycenaean and Early Iron Age Greece, and a debated source of evidence for social changes at the end of the Mycenaean period.

== Background and rationale ==
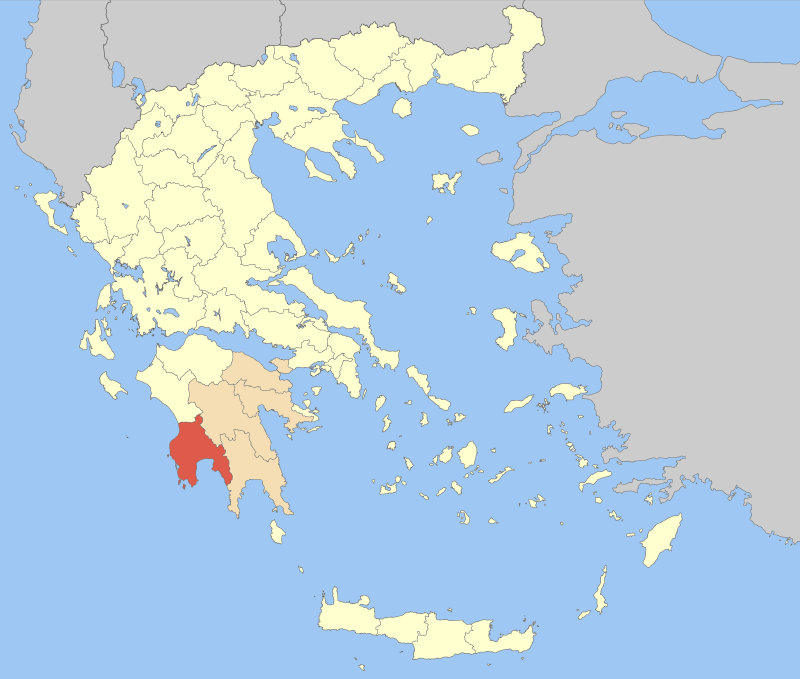
The region of Messenia within Greece

In a later reflection on the project, McDonald stated that the inspiration for the Minnesota Messenia Expedition came in 1953. McDonald had been working on the excavations of the so-called "Palace of Nestor" at Ano Englianos (now known as "Pylos") in Messenia, which had commenced under the joint directorship of the American archaeologist Carl Blegen and Konstantinos Kourouniotis, an archaeologist representing the Greek Archaeological Service, in the spring of 1939. The project at Pylos took on a significant role in the decipherment of Linear B, the writing system used in Mycenaean Greece. On April 3, 1939, the excavation's first trench hit an area later known as the Archives Complex, which contained over 600 tablets and fragments. McDonald, who was supervising the digging, spent several days along with Blegen excavating them by hand, receiving his director's tribute in the excavation write-up for his "circumspection, perseverance and long-suffering in spending so many days on his hands and knees in positions of extreme discomfort."

Interrupted by the outbreak of the Second World War, the excavations resumed in 1952. Kourouniotis had died in 1945, leaving Blegen in sole charge of the excavations: his successor at Archaeological Service, Spyridon Marinatos, focused his efforts primarily on fieldwork in the wider Messenia region. On May 19, 1953, the British scholar Michael Ventris wrote to Blegen, offering a transcription and translation of the Linear B tablet PY Ta 641 found at Pylos the previous year. Ventris' translation of this tablet served as near-conclusive proof that he had correctly deciphered Linear B, that Linear B encoded a form of Greek. In turn, the translation signalled the possibility of reading the archive of Linear B tablets that Blegen, with McDonald's assistance, had begun to unearth at Pylos. (Note: As of 2019, a total of 1587 Linear B tablets from Pylos are known.) The Pylos tablets revealed a large number of toponyms, and gave hints as to the political organisation of the Mycenaean state centred on Pylos – in particular, its organisation into a "Hither Province" and a "Further Province".

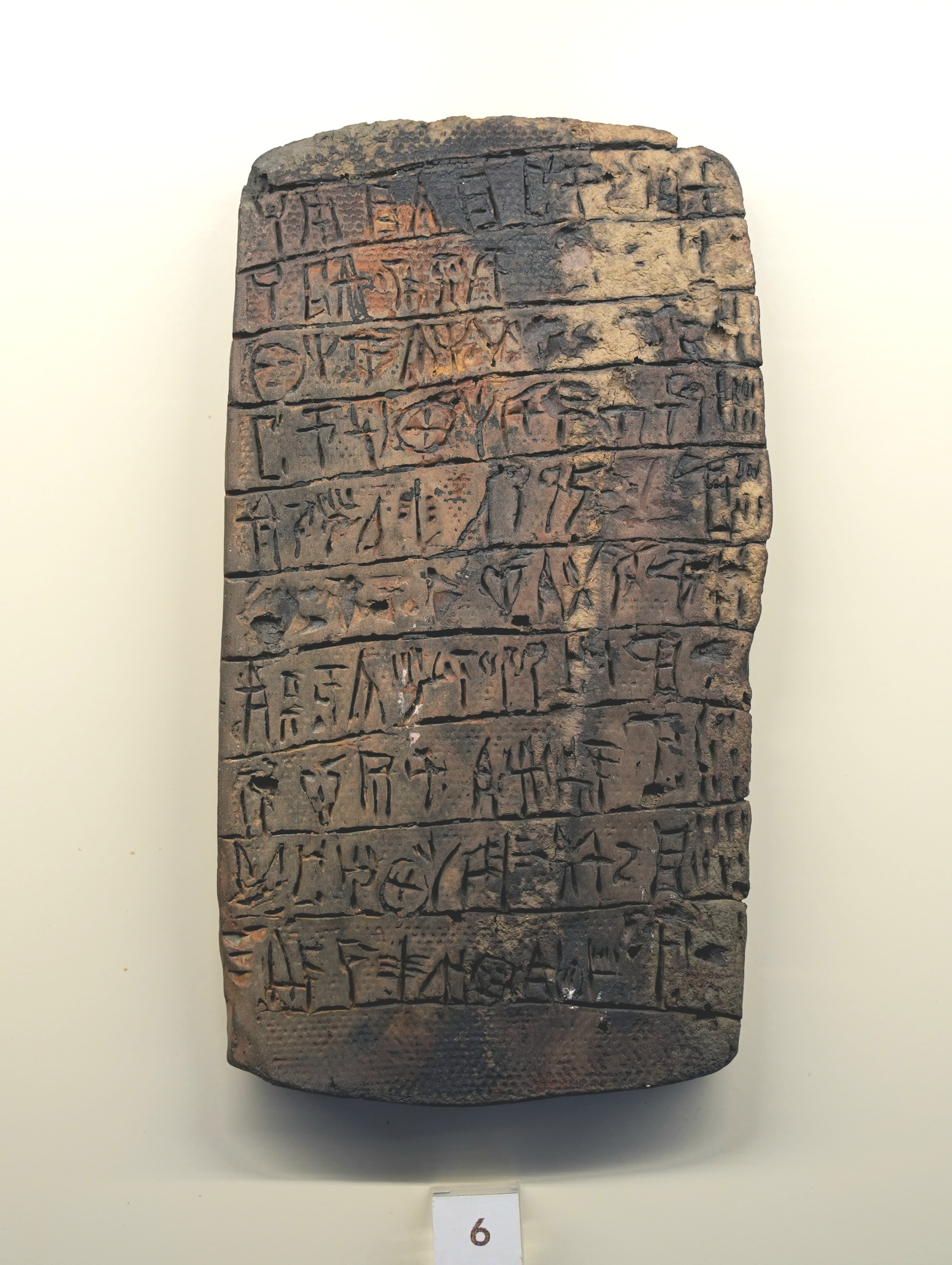
One of the Linear B tablets discovered by Blegen and McDonald at Pylos

Blegen, along with Ventris' collaborator John Chadwick and other scholars, saw the need for a greater understanding of the Mycenaean-era sites and settlements of Messenia, in order to match the toponyms listed in the Linear B tablets with the sites to which they related. While some field survey work had been carried out in Messenia during the first half of the 20th century, the number of known sites was comparatively low, and the quality of survey variable across different parts of the region. In 1935, the German archaeologist Georg Karo had been able to list only twenty-two plausibly dated Mycenaean sites, most of which were in turn derived from the survey conducted by the Swedish Natan Valmin, who had focused his efforts on the Soulima Valley in the north of the region. Other small-scale surveys had taken place in the 1930s and 1940s, principally two investigations by the American Jerome Sperling and the German Ernst Meyer in the north of Messenia, while Blegen had surveyed the region around the Bay of Navarino in early 1939. However, there was little understanding of how settlements had been distributed between these disconnected areas. Blegen therefore suggested that McDonald make a large-scale survey of Messenia, aiming in particular to identify 'towns' contemporary with the Linear B tablets.

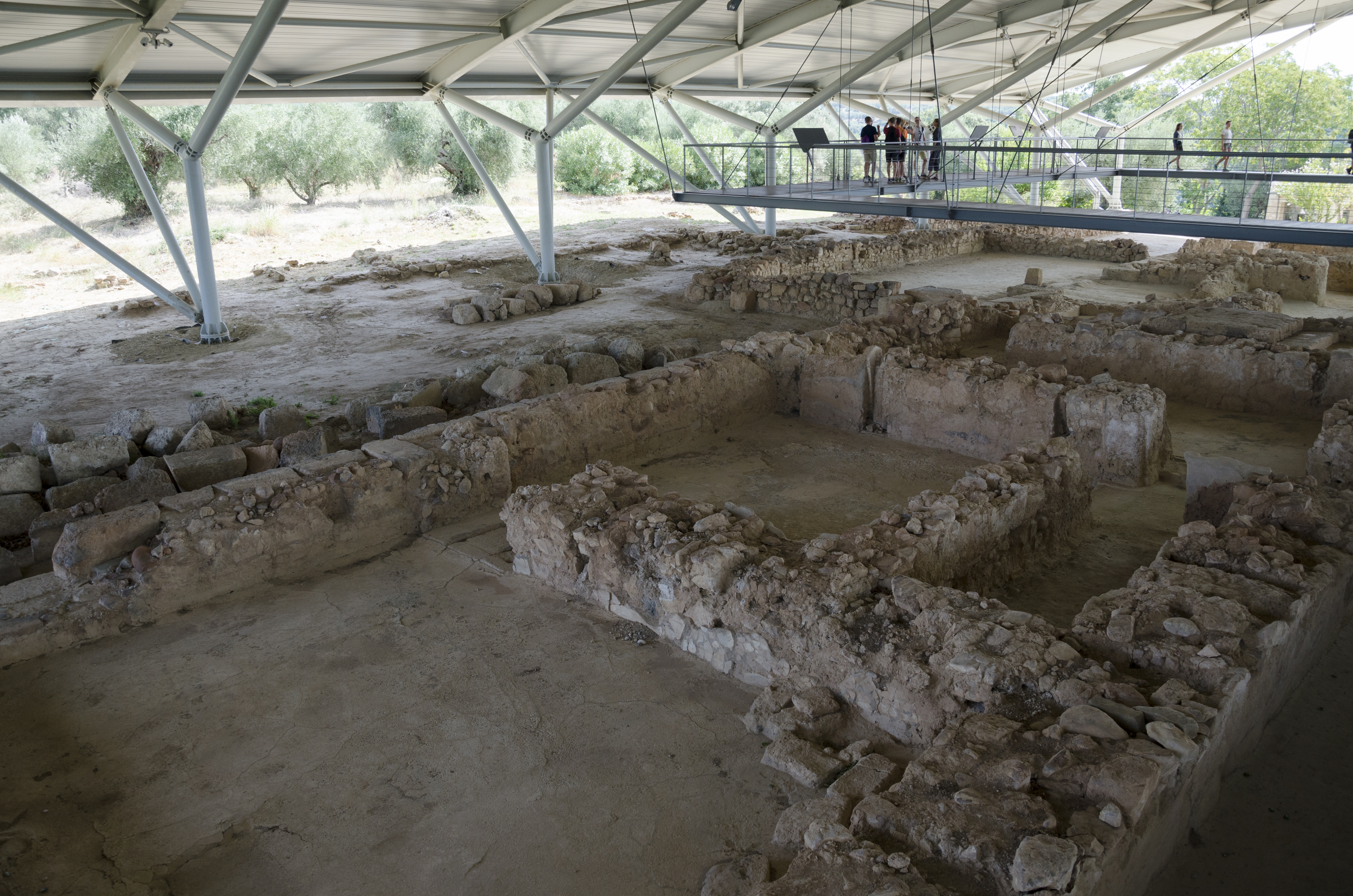
The ruins of the Palace of Nestor at Pylos, where Blegen and McDonald excavated Linear B tablets in 1939

The British landscape archaeologist John Cherry would later chart another line of inspiration for the UMME in McDonald's interest in the historicity of the Homeric epics, pointing to McDonald's 1942 article 'Where Did Nestor Live?', which attempted to use evidence from the Iliad and Odyssey to argue for the site of Ano Englianos as the home of Homer's Nestor. Indeed, McDonald's later collaborator, Richard Hope Simpson, would publish several works in the same methodological vein, including his Ph.D. thesis and his co-authored 1970 volume The Catalogue of the Ships in Homer's Iliad, both of which attempted to find the archaeological analogues of the toponyms used in the so-called "Catalogue of Ships" in the second book of the Iliad, and the publication of the UMME's findings would include the Trojan War as an historical event on its chronological chart.

== The survey project (1953–1968) ==
=== McDonald's first surveys (1953–1959) ===
"Naturally, our methods of search were modelled on those of Blegen and Wace. They are sound methods, tested and improved over a half century ... The basis is the typological study of the surface pottery; but, of course, one must first locate the sites on which pottery may be found. To do this successfully it is essential to have a firm grasp of the ancient topographical sources and to build on it a thorough familiarity with the modern countryside. One must learn the location of the best agricultural land and most abundant sources of water, what constitutes a good defensive location, healthful orientation, good drainage, easy communication. A knowledge of the present–day language and good rapport with local farmers and officials is also important. So are patience, a dependable and rugged method of transportation, and above all experience and sound instinct gained by trial and error over several seasons."

— William McDonald and Richard Hope Simpson, in the publication of the UMME, 1972.

In the earliest surveys, the main approach was to identify toponyms in Classical writers, particularly Homer, Strabo and Pausanias, and to attempt to cross–reference the descriptions of the places given in the ancient sources with the most likely sites for ancient settlement, given the surveyors' interpretation of the modern topography. McDonald and his collaborators largely looked for material dated to the LH IIIB period (c. 1300 – c. 1180 BCE), contemporary with the destruction of the palace at Pylos and the Linear B tablets discovered there. While these expeditions did not formally take place under the UMME name, McDonald and Hope Simpson would later include them under that label in their retrospective assessments of the development of the project.

McDonald's first surveys took place over two weeks in 1953, covering an area 5 to 10 kilometres (3.1 to 6.2 mi) in radius around the site of the Palace of Nestor, accompanied by Charalambos Christophilopoulos, a Messenian who had studied archaeology under Kourouniotis. He returned for four months in 1955, surveying the coastal region between Kyparissia and Methoni alongside Dionysios Androutsakis, the foreman of Blegen's excavations at Pylos. Finally, McDonald's receipt of a Guggenheim Fellowship for 1958–1959 allowed him to undertake a further series of expeditions with Androutsakis during 1958, from Korone to the Alfeios river. In other respects, McDonald experienced logistical and financial difficulties, later writing of his frustrations from having "practically no assured funding, and collegial attitudes ranging from cooperation to apathy to obstructionism." The Greek Archaeological Service issued annual permits for the work, and supervised the project's activities via its ephors for the Western Peloponnese.

In the spring of 1959, McDonald was joined by Richard Hope Simpson, with whom he developed the surveying methods that would characterise the project over its duration. These included large-scale, extensive survey (what McDonald called "regional exploration"), initially conducted by using a Land Rover to drive around Messenia and coming across sites by happenstance. Other distinctive methods of the UMME included a focus on identifying sites through surface finds rather than excavating them, a diachronic focus that collected and reported on evidence of habitation from the Neolithic until the Medieval period, and the attempt to find explanations for the patterns of site distribution and function observed through survey. The survey's approach would later be referred to as 'the Hope Simpson method', a label which McDonald resisted, writing in retrospect that "field strategies were not imposed by one collaborator but were gradually evolved by joint experience and discussion".

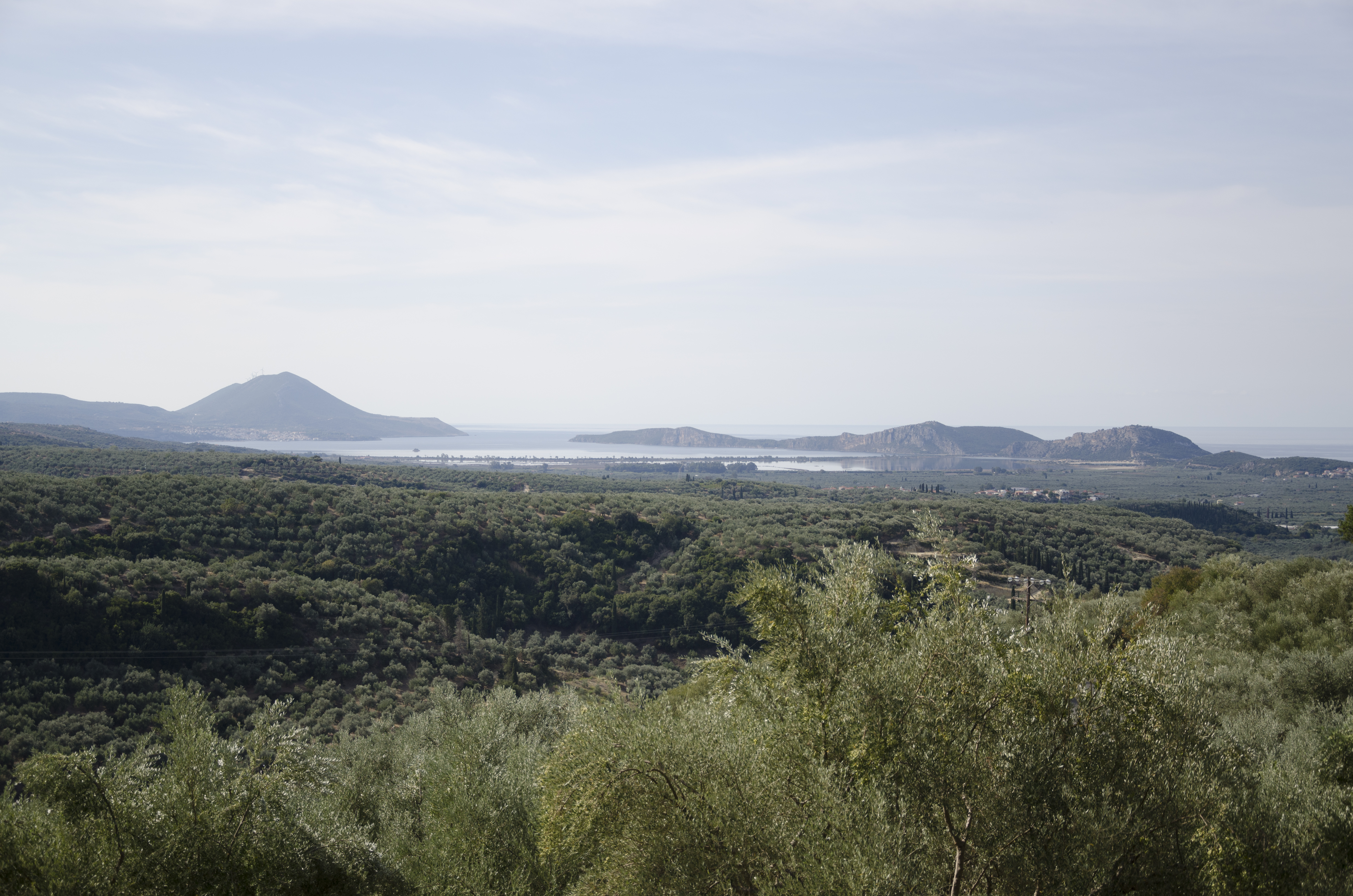
View over Messenia, looking southwest from the Palace of Nestor. Some of McDonald's earliest surveys took place in the area visible here.

An early indicator of the project's diachronic nature was the presence throughout the 1959 season of Peter Topping, director of the Gennadeion Library in Athens, who was researching the medieval habitation of Messenia. The later project's interdisciplinary nature was also foreshadowed by the two weeks in which Diomedes Charalambous, a geologist from the University of Athens, took part in the expedition, using an auger to uncover evidence of coastline changes since the Bronze Age.

McDonald and Hope Simpson undertook a final, short expedition in July 1960, checking the results of their survey with the assistance of Hope Simpson's frequent collaborator John Lazenby, before publishing their initial findings in the American Journal of Archaeology.

=== The University of Minnesota Messenia Expedition (1961–1968) ===
The UMME name was first formally used for the expedition from the 1961 season onwards. McDonald and Hope Simpson were joined on this expedition by three members of the University of Minnesota faculty: Jesse Fant, a civil engineer; Herbert E. Wright, a geologist; and Fred Lukermann, a geographer. During this period, the project received more regular funding: from the Louis W. and Maude Hill Family Foundation in 1962, 1964 and 1967; from the Bollingen Foundation of New York in 1963; and from various private donors. The expeditions' directors later wrote that all of these "should be credited with a crucial part in the UMME project."

As the project progressed, its scale and disciplinary range increased, inspired by contemporary projects in the Middle East (particularly the "Prehistoric Project", which surveyed in Iraq, Iran and Turkey, led by Robert Braidwood and Bruce Howe, and Robert McCormick Adams' Diyala Basin Archaeological Project), and in the New World (particularly the Teotihuacan Valley Project under William T. Sanders).McDonald and Hope Simpson expected all of the project's specialists to spend time working and socialising together, to read each other's work, and to become as familiar as possible with each other's area of expertise. The project secured the assistance of the Royal Hellenic Air Force to create aerial photographs of the region of Messenia, which were then interpreted by Fant (and later William Loy, who joined the project as a geographer and cartographer in 1965,) to identify potential ancient sites: McDonald and Hope Simpson later estimated that this allowed them to reduce their false positive rate for site identification below 50%, in contrast to over 90% from surface survey alone. While Hope Simpson and McDonald focused on the surface pottery, Fant surveyed for ancient roads while Wright attempted to reconstruct the paleotopography of the region. In total, the 1961 season uncovered around 150 probable Mycenaean sites.

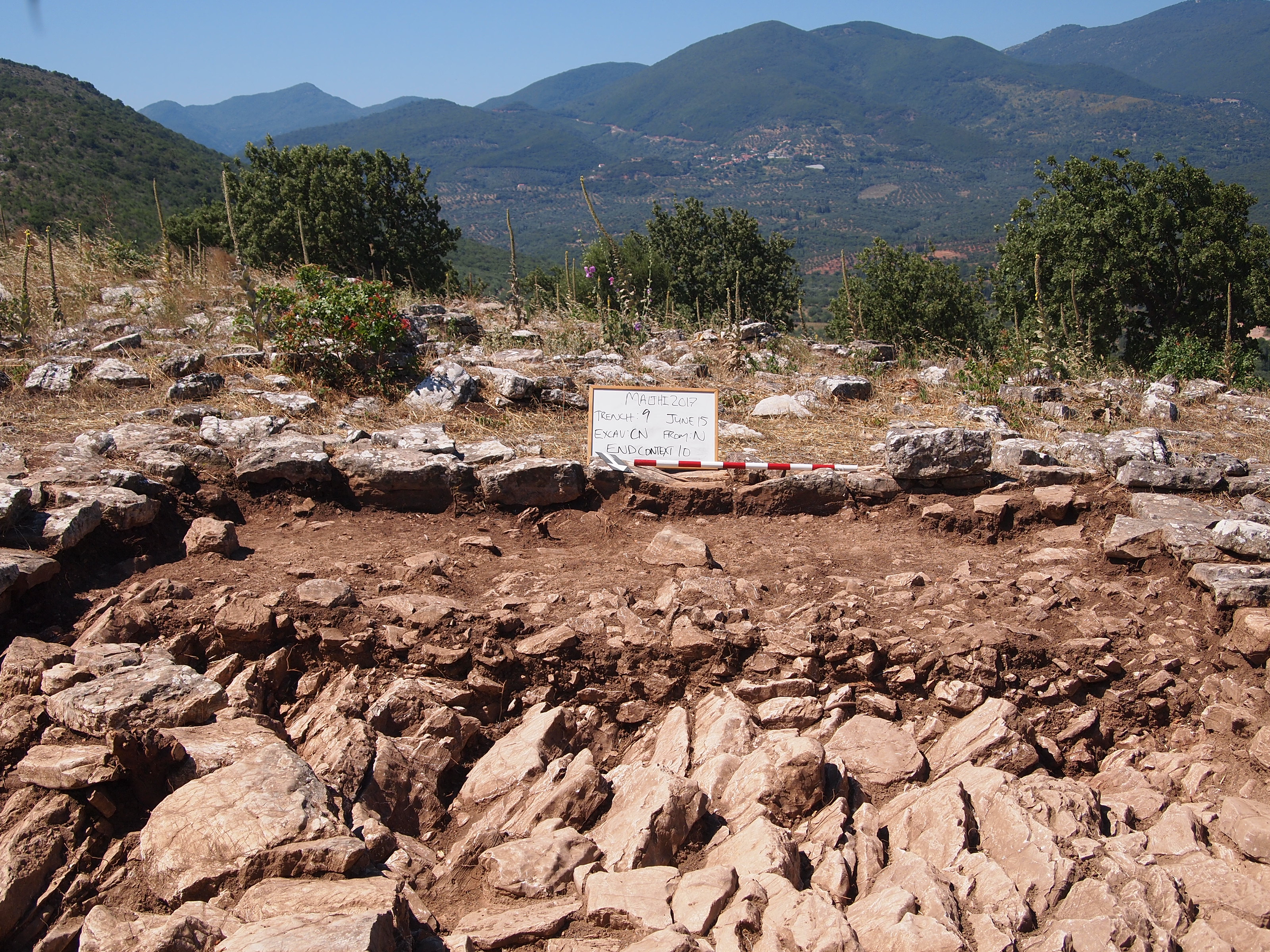
The site of Malthi, excavated by Natan Valmin between 1926 and 1935, and later surveyed by the UMME

The expedition returned to Messenia between March 25 and July 21, 1963, with the additional participation of the botanist Willem van Zeist; John Lazenby and his brother Stephen, an officer in the Royal Navy; Demetrios Christodoulou of the UN Food and Agriculture Organization; the ceramics specialist Frederick R. Matson; and Eskil Broburg, a graduate student at the University of Minnesota who served as the expedition's photographer. In 1964, Lukermann carried out investigations into the ancient population distribution, while Matson and Hope Simpson carried out anthropological investigations of contemporary ceramics manufacture on the island of Sifnos. Hope Simpson led the field survey between 1964 and 1968, also serving as acting director of the project from 1966 to 1968 as a result of McDonald's illness. He was assisted throughout by Fant; in 1964 by Lazenby; in 1965 by Roger Howell, a student at the British School at Athens; in 1967 by McDonald and in 1968 by two graduate students, Nancy Wilkie and Nancy Spencer. Loy, then Luckermann's Ph.D. student, assisted Hope Simpson with the 1966 field survey.

The findings of the project, which eventually surveyed around 3,800 square kilometres (1,500 sq mi) of Messenia, were published in the multidisciplinary volume The Minnesota Messenia Expedition: Reconstructing a Bronze-Age Regional Environment in 1972, edited by McDonald and Rapp. Reviewing the work in the American Journal of Archaeology, L. Vance Watrous credited it, along with Blegen's volumes from the Pylos excavations, as having established Messenia as "the best-documented region of prehistoric Greece", an estimation echoed by the Mycenaean scholar Sterling Dow. In total, the project found 215 prehistoric sites and a further 98 inhabited between the Classical and medieval periods. The project estimated the overall population of Mycenaean Messenia at around 50,000, a figure McDonald reaffirmed in a 1979 article co-written with Joan Carothers.

== The excavation of Nichoria (1969–1975) ==
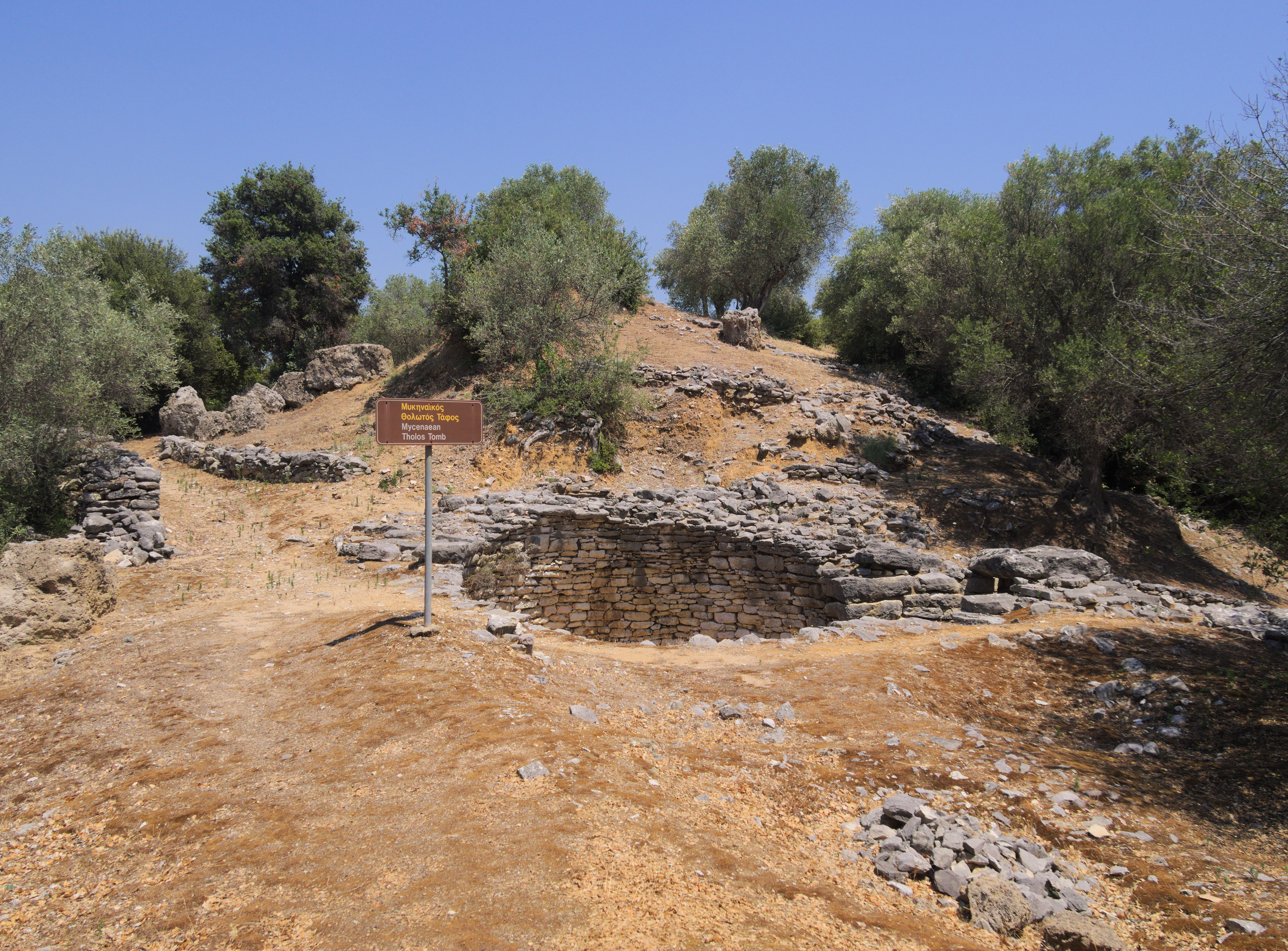
The so-called "UMME" tholos tomb at Nichoria, excavated in 1970–1971

The excavation of Nichoria was conceived as the second phase of the Minnesota expedition, and as an opportunity to test in detail the large-scale hypotheses generated by the survey project. During the UMME survey, the site was suggested by John Chadwick as a possible location for the settlement known in the Linear B as 𐀵𐀗𐀶𐀀𐀑𐀁 (ti-mi-to-a-ke-e): the capital of Pylos' 'Further Province' and an important site for the flax industry, as well as the region's coastal defence.

McDonald first identified the prehistoric site of Nichoria in October 1958, and conducted test excavations there in 1959 with Nicholas Yalouris, ephor of the Western Peloponnese for the Greek Archaeological Service, to assess the suitability of the site for a full-scale excavation. (Note: The site of Kafirio, near Longa, was also investigated in the same year, but no further excavations were made.) Excavations, under the permits of the American School of Classical Studies at Athens, took place between 1969 and 1973, with processing work continuing until 1975, and were published in three volumes between 1978 and 1983. (Note: A fourth volume was planned, but never published.)

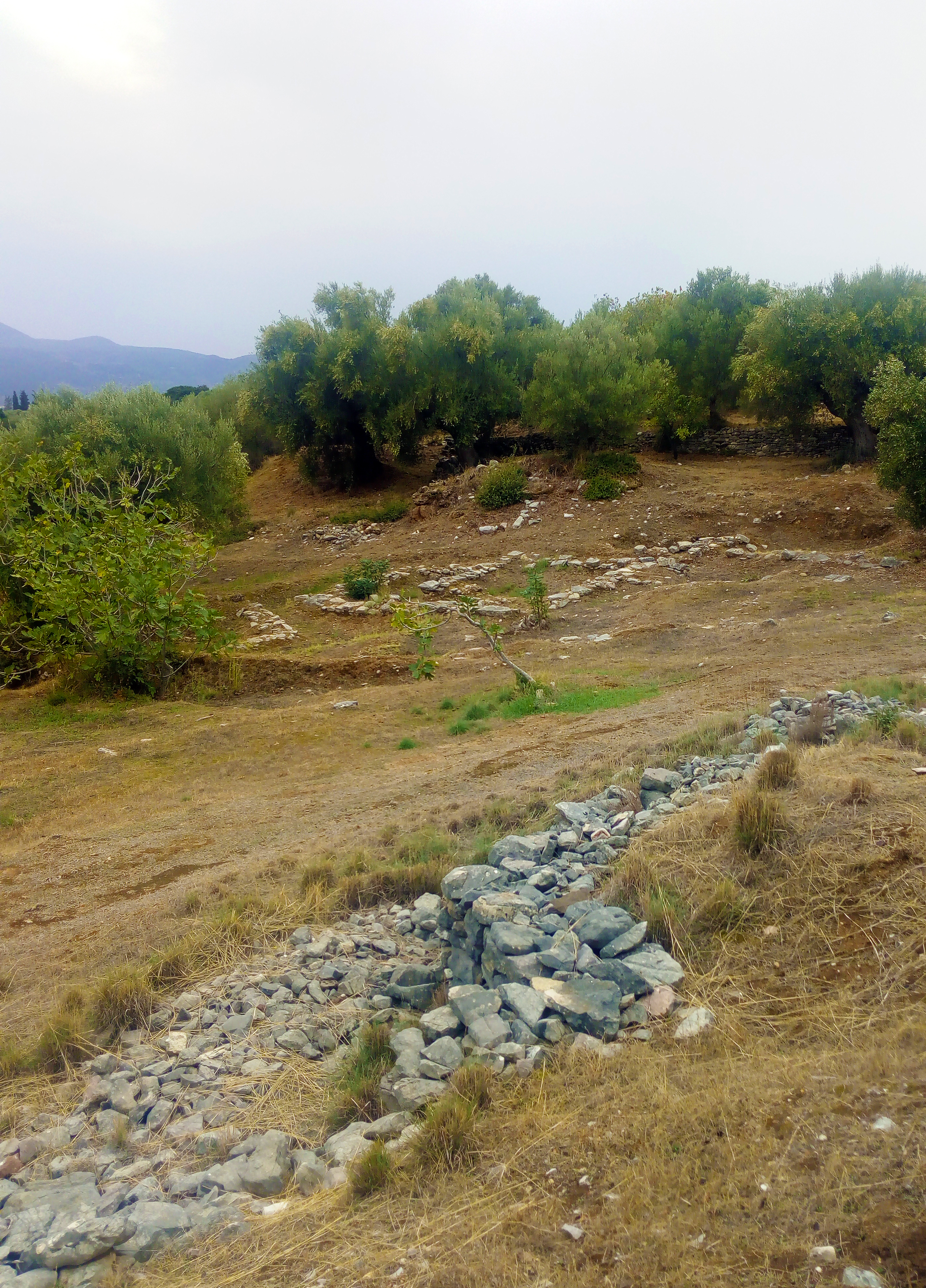
Habitation remains on the ridge at Nichoria

The site of Nichoria, which included a settlement and associated cemeteries, covered around 50,000 square metres (5.0 ha), centred around a 500m ridge that has been described as "perhaps the most eroded site ever to be excavated in Greece". Approximately 4,600 square metres (0.46 ha), or 9.2%, of the site was excavated in total. After an initial eight-week season in 1969, focusing on test excavations in seven areas of the site, work in 1970–1971 focused on the areas labelled in 1969 as I–IV, uncovering the remains of a tholos tomb (since known to scholarship as the "UMME" or "MME" tholos) and evidence of habitation from the Early Helladic period (c. 3100 – c. 2000 BCE) into the Early Iron Age.

The excavators found evidence of the abandonment of the site around 750 BCE, and suggested that this may have been a consequence of the defeat of the Messenians by the Spartans in the First Messenian War.

The excavation of Nichoria was particularly notable for its use of the scientific approaches of the 'New Archaeology' (now generally known as 'processual archaeology') developed in the 1960s. In the initial 1969 season, the whole site was surveyed by magnetometer, allowing the excavators to estimate the overall size of the ancient settlement at approximately 40,000 square metres (4.0 ha). The excavators experimented with the use of photogrammetry to produce maps of the site, and employed both dry sieving and wet sieving, then unusual in classical archaeology, to process soil samples, allowing the recovery of small fragments of artefacts as well as archaeobotanical and zooarchaeological remains. Attempts were also made to carbon-date some of the remains, which helped to indicate some of the limitations of the use of this technique in the Aegean region. (Note: In particular, that dates obtained for contemporary material through carbon-dating sometimes disagree, or are inconsistent with known historical records or other methods of scientific dating. For a full discussion of this phenomenon in Aegean prehistory, see Wiener 2012.)

== Notable participants ==
- William McDonald (1953–1975, field director)
- Richard Hope Simpson (1959–1975, acting field director 1966–1968)
- George Rapp (1966–1975, assistant director)
- Herbert E. Wright (1962–1968)
- Willem van Zeist (1963–1968)
- John Chadwick (assisted with analysis throughout, and in the field briefly in 1968.)
- Cynthia Shelmerdine (excavated at Nichoria 1972–1975)
- Nancy Wilkie (1968–1975)
- Sterling Dow (1963)

== Legacy ==
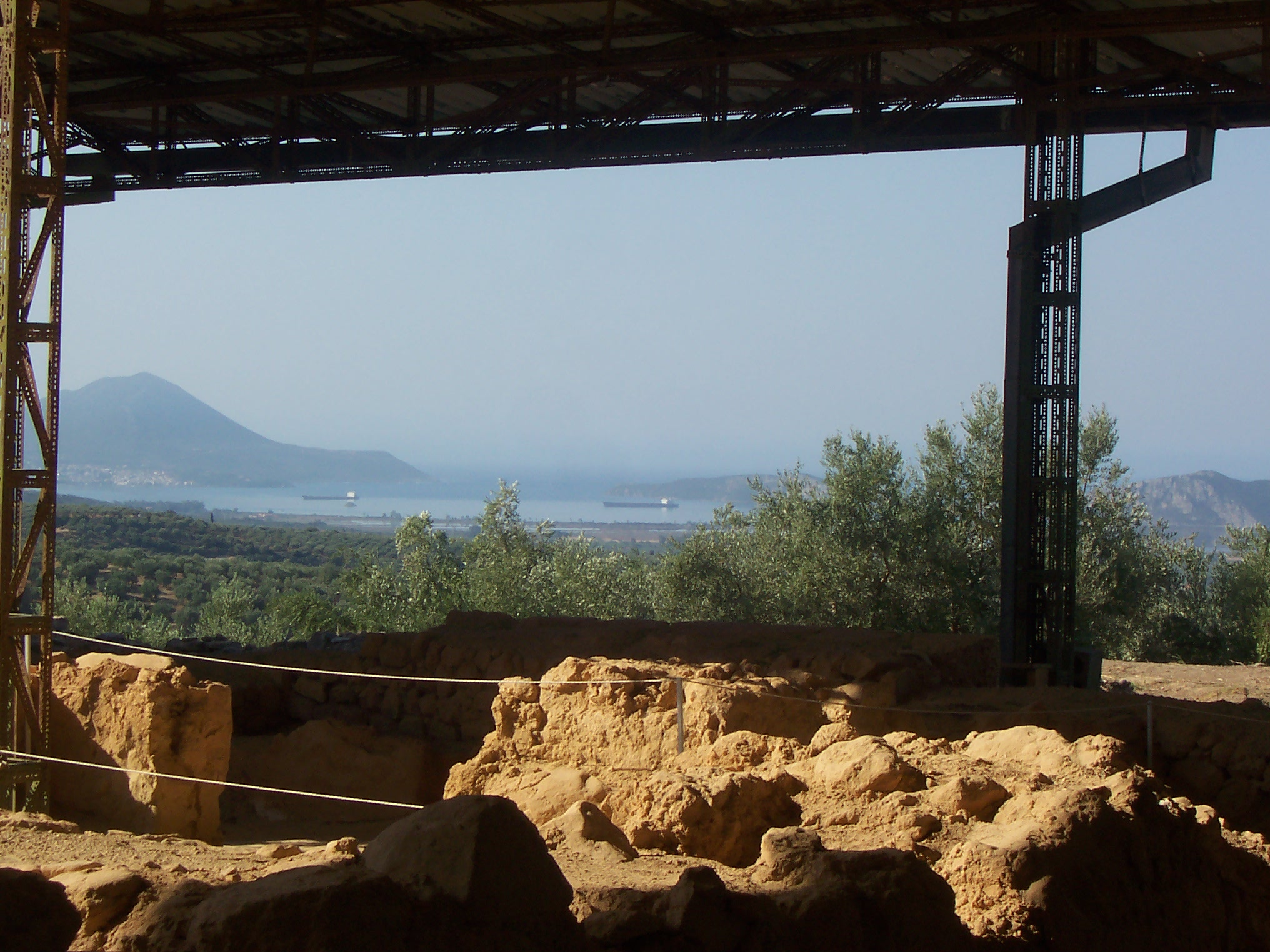
View of the Gialova lagoon from the Palace of Nestor, Pylos

John Cherry described the UMME as a "watershed" in the understanding of Bronze-Age Greece. (Note: Modern Approaches to Ancient History, lecture delivered at the University of Washington, 1987, quoted in McDonald and Thomas 1990, p. 405) It has been described as "the first truly multidisciplinary archaeological expedition in Greece", and credited with "kick-starting" the practice of regional studies in that country. It was the first of numerous regional landscape surveys in Greece, such as the Southern Argolid Survey and the Berbati Valley Project, which often adopted a more intensive survey methodology while maintaining the UMME's interdisciplinary, diachronic approach. In particular, the Pylos Regional Archaeological Project, which began in 1990, aimed to build on the material collected by the UMME; its director, Jack Davis, later cited the 1972 "Mycenaean Geography" conference at the University of Cambridge, centred on the results of the UMME, as the source of his interest in Messenia. Specifically, Davis hoped to complement the UMME's collection of large-scale, low-resolution information with more detailed, intensive survey of smaller areas of the region.

The survey expeditions significantly expanded the corpus of known Mycenaean sites, particularly those outside palatial centres like Mycenae, Tiryns and Pylos, few of which had previously been excavated. The surveys carried out directly by the UMME were complemented by contemporary work by Spyridon Marinatos, who largely focused on funerary sites, and Natan Valmin, who surveyed and excavated in the region of Malthi. By the completion of the UMME survey, more tholos tombs were known in Messenia than had been known in all of Greece before 1940. The UMME's approach was later criticised for its reliance on aerial photography and the investigators' intuition to identify areas for survey, which led to uneven coverage and a tendency to miss smaller sites, particularly those whose location did not conform to the surveyors' expectations, but also described as "a prodigious influence on the development of archaeology in Greece", which "permitted for the first time the systematic examination of Mycenaean geography."

The UMME's findings were significant in the debate over the end of the Mycenaean period, sometimes termed the Late Bronze Age collapse. The excavations at Nichoria, in particular, have been described as "fundamental" for the understanding of the transition between the Bronze Age and Iron Age in Greece, as well as for the development of the Greek polis. At the end of the Bronze Age (c. 1180 BCE), many Mycenaean sites, including the Palace of Nestor, were destroyed by fire, and the palatial system of administration that had characterised later Mycenaean civilisation ceased to exist. The UMME observed significantly fewer sites that could be dated to the LH IIIC period (c. 1180 – c. 1050 BCE), postdating the "collapse", than those that could be dated to the LH IIIB period preceding it, and these observations have been taken as evidence of demographic decline, either through mortality or emigration. However, the expedition also observed a large amount of continuity in site use and habitation on either side of the LH IIIB/IIIC divide, which suggested to McDonald and Hope Simpson that any collapse in the society of Mycenaean Messenia could not have been total. They also argued that their evidence weighed against then-popular theories for the reasons behind the end of the palatial system, including an external "Dorian Invasion" or a widespread uprising against palatial rule. The question of Messenia's population in the final decades of the Late Bronze Age remains controversial: in 2017, the archaeologist Sarah C. Murray wrote that "the record of intensive survey data, especially that from the period between the thirteenth and eighth century BCE, is deeply problematic for reconstructing accurate population figures."

=== The animal bones from Nichoria ===
The project's interest in zooarchaeology and the recovery of animal bones made Nichoria into an important site for the study of diet in Mycenaean and Iron Age Greece. Initial examination by the expedition's animal-bone specialists, Robert Sloan and Mary Ann Duncan, suggested that the primary meat consumed at Nichoria during the Mycenaean period came from goats, followed by sheep, pigs and cattle. This provided a contrast with the proportion of animals mentioned in the Linear B tablets, where cattle and sheep predominated – a difference which Cynthia Shelmerdine, one of the UMME's archaeologists, suggested as a reflection of the greater interest of palace-based scribes in these animals, which had more direct economic importance to the palace. Sloan and Duncan also observed a significant increase in the proportion of cattle bones in the Early Iron Age, accounting for around 35% of the animals recorded versus 20% in the Mycenaean period, which they connected with a shift towards the use of cattle for meat, rather than for milk.

In the late 1980s, the British archaeologist Anthony Snodgrass used the results from Nichoria to argue for a "pastoral hypothesis" to explain the apparent drop in observed settlement numbers throughout Greece between the Late Bronze Age and Early Iron Age. Under this hypothesis, large, permanent, archaeologically visible settlements were abandoned in favour of transient pastoralism, which Snodgrass justified by the apparent rise in the proportion of cattle reared and consumed at Nichoria during this period. However, later studies by Elizabeth Mancz, who completed a PhD on the material in the 1980s, and Flint Dibble, who reviewed and reassessed the bones in the early 21st century, questioned the underlying data. Both Mancz and Dibble suggested that the apparent increase in the ratio of cattle bones is best explained by taphonomic processes, specifically chemical and attritional weathering, which had a disproportionate effect on later chronological layers (which lay closer to the surface) and the smaller bones of goats and sheep, and so artificially inflated the apparent proportion of cattle in the Early Iron Age samples vis-à-vis those from the Bronze Age. In addition, archaeobotanical evidence suggests that all of the subsistence plants cultivated at Nichoria during the Bronze Age continued to be grown during the Early Iron Age, which has led to the general rejection of the "pastoral hypothesis" by scholars.

== Bibliography ==
=== Publications of the UMME ===
- Rapp, George; Aschenbrenner, Stanley E., eds. (1978). Excavations at Nichoria in Southwest Greece, Volume I: Site, Environs, and Techniques. Minneapolis: University of Minnesota Press. ISBN 978-0-8166-0824-9.
- McDonald, William; Wilkie, Nancy, eds. (1992). Excavations at Nichoria in Southwest Greece. Vol. 2, The Bronze Age Occupation. Minneapolis: University of Minnesota Press. ISBN 978-0-8166-0824-9.
- McDonald, William; Coulson, William D. E.; Rosser, John, eds. (1983). Excavations at Nichoria in Southwest Greece. Vol. 3, Dark Age and Byzantine Occupation. Minneapolis: University of Minnesota Press. doi:10.1017/S0009840X00107772. ISBN 978-0-8166-1144-7. S2CID 246875825.
- McDonald, William; Shay, C.Thomas; Wilkie, Nancy; Hope Simpson, Richard; Coulson, William D.E.; Donovan, William P.; Blitzer, Harriet; Rosser, J.; Aschenbrenner, Stanley; Howell, R.J.; Dickinson, Oliver T.P.K.; Hughes-Brock, Helen; Wade, William D.; Wolberg, Donald L.; Grady, Frederick V.; Sloan, Robert E.; Shay, Jennifer; Rapp, George; Cooke, S.R.B. (1975). "Excavations at Nichoria in Messenia: 1972-1973". Hesperia: The Journal of the American School of Classical Studies at Athens. 44 (1): 69–141. doi:10.2307/147426. JSTOR 147426.
- McDonald, William; Rapp, George, eds. (1972). The Minnesota Messenia Expedition: Reconstructing a Bronze Age Regional Environment. Minneapolis: University of Minnesota Press. ISBN 978-0-8166-0636-8.
- McDonald, William (1972a). "Excavations at Nichoria in Messenia: 1969–71". Hesperia. 41 (2): 218–273. doi:10.2307/147682. JSTOR 147682.
- McDonald, William; Hope Simpson, Richard (1969). "Further Explorations in Southwestern Peloponnese: 1964-1968". American Journal of Archaeology. 73 (2): 123–177. doi:10.2307/502778. JSTOR 502778. S2CID 191396062.
- McDonald, William; Hope Simpson, Richard (1964). "Further Exploration in Southwestern Peloponnese: 1962–1963". American Journal of Archaeology. 68 (3): 229–245. doi:10.2307/502386. JSTOR 502386. S2CID 191378537.
- McDonald, William; Hope Simpson, Richard (1961). "Prehistoric Habitation in Southwestern Peloponnese". American Journal of Archaeology. 65 (3): 221–260. doi:10.2307/501685. JSTOR 501685. S2CID 191400047.

=== Other works cited ===
- Aprile, Jamie D. (2013). "Crafts, Specialists, and Markets in Mycenaean Greece. The New Political Economy of Nichoria: Using Intrasite Distributional Data to Investigate Regional Institutions". American Journal of Archaeology. 117 (3): 429–436. doi:10.3764/aja.117.3.0429. hdl:2152/31046. JSTOR 10.3764. S2CID 148377869.
- Bartonĕk, Antonín (1958). "Emmett L. Bennett, Jr., "The Pylos Tablets, Texts of the Inscriptions Found, 1939-1954"". Archiv Orientální. 26 (4): 680–684.
- Blegen, Carl (1953). "The Palace of Nestor Excavations at Pylos, 1952". American Journal of Archaeology. 57 (2): 59–64. doi:10.2307/501233. JSTOR 501233. S2CID 191409796.
- Carothers, Joan; McDonald, William (1979). "Size and Distribution of the Population in Late Bronze Age Messenia: Some Statistical Approaches". Journal of Field Archaeology. 6 (4): 433–454. doi:10.1179/009346979791489005. JSTOR 529426.
- Chadwick, John (1972). "The Mycenaean Documents". In McDonald, William; Rapp, George (eds.). The Minnesota Messenia Expedition: Reconstructing a Bronze Age Regional Environment. Minneapolis: University of Minnesota Press. pp. 100–116. ISBN 978-0-8166-0636-8.
- Chadwick, John (1961). "The Two Provinces of Pylos". Minos: Revista de filología egea: 125–142. Archived from the original on 2022-12-17.
- Chadwick, John; Ventris, Michael (1956). Documents in Mycenaean Greek. Cambridge: Cambridge University Press. OCLC 280158086.
- Cherry, John (2004). "Cyprus, the Mediterranean, and survey: current issues and future trends". British School at Athens Studies. 11: 23–35.
- Cosmopoulos, Michael B. (2006). "The Political Landscape of Mycenaean States: A-pu₂ and the Hither Province of Pylos". American Journal of Archaeology. 110 (2): 205–228. doi:10.3764/aja.110.2.205. JSTOR 40027152. S2CID 155607685.
- Davis, Jack; Alcock, Susan; Bennet, John; Lolos, Yannis; Shelmerdine, Cynthia (1997). "The Pylos Regional Archaeological Project, Part I: Overview and the Archaeological Survey". Hesperia. 66 (3): 391–494. doi:10.2307/148395. JSTOR 148395.
- Davis, Jack (2022). A Greek State in Formation: The Origins of Civilisation in Mycenaean Pylos. Oakland, California: University of California Press.
- Dibble, Flint; Fallu, Daniel J. (2020). "New data from old bones: A taphonomic reassessment of Early Iron Age beef ranching at Nichoria, Greece". Journal of Archaeological Science: Reports. 30 102234: 1–10. Bibcode:2020JArSR..30j2234D. doi:10.1016/j.jasrep.2020.102234. S2CID 212836465.
- Deger-Jalkotzy, Sigrid (2008). "Decline, Destruction, Aftermath". In Shelmerdine, Cynthia (ed.). The Cambridge Companion to the Aegean Bronze Age. Cambridge: Cambridge University Press. pp. 387–415. ISBN 978-1-139-00189-2.
- Dibble, Flint (2017). Politika Zoa: Animals and Social Change in Ancient Greece (1600–300 B.C.) (Ph.D. thesis). University of Cincinnati.
- Dow, Sterling (1978). "Reviewed Work(s): The Minnesota Messenia Expedition. Reconstructing a Bronze Age Regional Environment by William A. McDonald, George R. Rapp". The Classical World. 71 (6): 398–400. doi:10.2307/4348912. JSTOR 4348912.
- Foxhall, Lin (2015) [2014]. "Households, Hierarchies, Territories and Landscapes in Bronze Age and Iron Age Greece". In Knapp, A. Bernard; van Dommelen, Peter (eds.). The Cambridge Prehistory of the Bronze and Iron Age Mediterranean. Cambridge: Cambridge University Press. pp. 417–436. doi:10.1017/CHO9781139028387. ISBN 978-1-139-02838-7.
- Greenberg, Bayle Z., ed. (15 November 1962). "University of Minnesota Staff Bulletin" (PDF). University of Minnesota Staff Bulletin.
- Hamilakis, Yannis (1996). "A footnote on the archaeology of power: Animal bones from a Mycenaean chamber tomb at Galatas, NE Peloponnese". The Annual of the British School at Athens. 91: 153–166. doi:10.1017/S0068245400016440. S2CID 162364792.
- Hood, Sinclair (1985). "William A. McDonald, William D.E. Coulson, John Rosser (edd.): Excavations at Nichoria in Southwest Greece, Vol. III: Dark Age and Byzantine Occupation. pp. xxxii + 529; 358 figures, 447 I plates and 67 maps. Minneapolis: The University of Minnesota Press, 1983. $49.50". The Classical Review. 35 (1): 159–161. doi:10.1017/S0009840X00107772. S2CID 246875825.
- Hope Simpson, Richard; Lazenby, John (1970). The Catalogue of the Ships in Homer's Iliad. Oxford: Clarendon Press. ISBN 978-0-19-814349-9.
- Hope Simpson, Richard (1963). The Topography of Mycenaean Greece in Relation to the Achaean Section of the Homeric Catalogue of the Ships (Ph.D. thesis). University of London.
- Judson, Anna; Bennet, John; Davis, Jack; Stocker, Sharon (2019). "Two new Linear B tablets and an enigmatic find from Bronze Age Pylos (Palace of Nestor)" (PDF). Kadmos. 58 (1): 111123. doi:10.1515/kadmos-2019-0006. S2CID 220368880. Archived from the original (PDF) on 2022-12-16.
- Karadimas, Nektarios (2015). ""His Eyes Took on a Far Away Look When He Spoke of Pylos": Carl Blegen and the Excavations of Pylos as Seen in the Greek and Foreign Press". In Davis, Jack L.; Vogeikoff-Brogan, Natalia; Florou, Vasilliki (eds.). Carl W. Blegen: Personal and Archaeological Narratives. Atlanta: Lockwood Press. pp. 177–208. ISBN 978-1-937040-23-9.
- Kardulias, P. Nick (1994). "Towards an Anthropological Historical Archaeology in Greece". Historical Archaeology. 28 (3): 39–55. doi:10.1007/BF03374189. S2CID 151791221.
- Karo, Georg (1935). "Mykenische Kultur". Realencyclopädie der classischen Altertumswissenschaft, Supplement VI. Stuttgart: Metzler.
- Kourouniotis, Konstantinos; Blegen, Carl (1939). "Excavations at Pylos, 1939". American Journal of Archaeology. 43 (4): 557–576. doi:10.2307/498982. JSTOR 498982. S2CID 193102694.
- Loy, William; Wright, Herbert (1972). "The Physical Setting". In McDonald, William; Rapp, George (eds.). The Minnesota Messenia Expedition: Reconstructing a Bronze Age Regional Environment. Minneapolis: University of Minnesota Press. pp. 36–46. ISBN 978-0-8166-0636-8.
- Mancz, Elizabeth (1989). An Examination of Changing Patterns in Animal-Husbandry of the Late Bronze and Dark Ages of Nichoria in the Southwestern Peloponnese (Ph.D. thesis). University of Minnesota.
- Mayhew, A.; Neale, W.; Tandy, D (1985). "Markets in the Ancient Near East: A Challenge to Silver's Argument and Use of Evidence". The Journal of Economic History. 45 (1): 127–134. doi:10.1017/S0022050700033623. S2CID 153858273.
- McDonald, William; Thomas, Carol G. (1990) [1967]. Progress into the Past: The Rediscovery of Mycenaean Civilisation (2nd ed.). Bloomington and Indianapolis: Indiana University Press. ISBN 978-0-253-33627-9.
- McDonald, William; Hope Simpson, Richard (1972). "Archaeological Exploration". In McDonald, William; Rapp, George (eds.). The Minnesota Messenia Expedition: Reconstructing a Bronze Age Regional Environment. Minneapolis: University of Minnesota Press. pp. 117–147. ISBN 978-0-8166-0636-8.
- McDonald, William (1984). "The Minnesota Messenia Survey: A Look Back". Studies Presented to Sterling Dow on his Eightieth Birthday. Durham, North Carolina: Duke University. pp. 185–192. OCLC 11484504.
- McDonald, William (1972b). "The Problems and the Program". In McDonald, William; Rapp, George (eds.). The Minnesota Messenia Expedition: Reconstructing a Bronze Age Regional Environment. Minneapolis: University of Minnesota Press. pp. 3–17. ISBN 978-0-8166-0636-8.
- McDonald, William (1942). "Where Did Nestor Live?". American Journal of Archaeology. 46 (4): 538–545. doi:10.2307/499086. JSTOR 499086. S2CID 193063966.
- Monzani, J.C. (2011). "Nichoria: an example of spatial archaeology in Greece". Revista do Museu de Arqueologia e Etnologia, São Paulo, Suplemento 11: 63–69.
- Muhly, James D. (1980). "Reviewed Work(s): Excavations at Nichoria in Southwest Greece, Vol. I: Site, Environs, and Techniques by George Rapp, and Stanley E. Aschenbrenner". American Journal of Archaeology. 84 (1): 101–102. doi:10.2307/504403. JSTOR 504403.
- Murray, Sarah C. (2017). The Collapse of the Mycenaean Economy: Imports, Trade, and Institutions 1300–700 BCE. Cambridge: Cambridge University Press. doi:10.1017/9781316890424. ISBN 978-1-316-89042-4.
- Petrakis, Vassilis (2021). "Transforming Expressions and Perceptions of Prestige in the Middle Helladic and Early Mycenaean Southwestern Peloponnese". In Eder, Birgitta; Zavadil, Michaela (eds.). (Social) Place and Space in Early Mycenaean Greece (PDF). Vienna. pp. 295–319. ISBN 978-3-7001-8854-4. Archived from the original (PDF) on 2022-12-18.
- Shelmerdine, Cynthia (2008). "Introduction: Background, Methods and Sources". In Shelmerdine, Cynthia (ed.). The Cambridge Companion to the Aegean Bronze Age. Cambridge: Cambridge University Press. pp. 1–18. ISBN 978-1-139-00189-2.
- Shelmerdine, Cynthia (1981). "Nichoria in Context: A Major Town in the Pylos Kingdom". American Journal of Archaeology. 85 (3): 319–325. doi:10.2307/504173. JSTOR 504173. S2CID 191376892.
- Shelmerdine, Susan (2014). "Biography of Cynthia W. Shelmerdine". In Nakassis, Dimitri; Gulizio, Joann; James, Sarah A. (eds.). KE-RA-ME-JA: Studies Presented to Cynthia W. Shelmerdine. Philadelphia: INSTAP Academic Press. p. xiii. ISBN 978-1-62303-357-6.
- Sloan, Robert E.; Duncan, Mary Ann (1978). "Zooarchaeology of Nichoria". In Rapp, George; Aschenbrenner, Stanley E. (eds.). Excavations at Nichoria in Southwest Greece, Volume I: Site, Environs, and Techniques. Minneapolis: University of Minnesota Press. pp. 60–77. ISBN 978-0-8166-0824-9.
- Snodgrass, Anthony (1987). An Archaeology of Greece: The Present State and Future Scope of the Discipline. Berkeley: University of California Press. ISBN 978-0-520-91278-6.
- Tracy, Stephen V. (2018). "The Acceptance of the Greek Solution for Linear B". Hesperia. 87 (1): 1–16. doi:10.2972/hesperia.87.1.0001. JSTOR 10.2972/hesperia.87.1.0001. S2CID 186486561.
- Valmin, Natan (1930). Études Topographiques sur la Messinie Ancienne (in French). Lund: Impr. de C. Blom. OCLC 458338101.
- Watrous, L. Vance (1974). "The Minnesota Messenia Expedition. Reconstructing a Bronze Age Regional Environment by William A. McDonald and George R. Rapp". American Journal of Archaeology. 78 (1): 84–86. doi:10.2307/503772. JSTOR 503772.
- Wiener, Malcolm H. (2012). "Problems in the Measurement, Calibration, Analysis, and Communication of Radiocarbon Dates (With Special Reference to the Prehistory of the Aegean World)". Radiocarbon. 54 (3–4): 423–434. Bibcode:2012Radcb..54..423W. doi:10.1017/S0033822200047184. S2CID 220704827.
