= Nancy Wilkie =

American archaeologist (1942–2021)

Nancy C. Wilkie
- Born: Nancy Clausen Wilkie; December 27, 1942; Milwaukee
- Died: January 18, 2021 (aged 78)
- Board member of: Archaeological Institute of America (president 1998–2002)
- Spouse: Craig Anderson
- Awards: Outstanding Public Service Award (Archaeological Institute of America)

Academic background
- Education: Stanford University; University of Minnesota
- Thesis: A Tholos Tomb at Nichoria: Its Construction and Use (1975)
- Doctoral advisor: William Andrew McDonald

Academic work
- Discipline: Archaeology
- Sub-discipline: Mycenaean Greece
- Institutions: Carleton College, American School of Classical Studies at Athens

Nancy Clausen Wilkie (27 December 1942 – 18 January 2021) was an American archaeologist. She served as president of the Archaeological Institute of America between 1998 and 2002, and worked on archaeological projects in Greece, Egypt, Sri Lanka and Nepal.

Wilkie began her archaeological career as a graduate student at the University of Minnesota, joining the University of Minnesota Messenia Expedition in 1968. During her time with the UMME, she became heavily involved in the excavation of the important Mycenaean site of Nichoria, working there as a trench supervisor before completing her PhD thesis on the site's tholos tomb. She played a leading role in the publication of the results of the Nichoria excavations, which were eventually released in 1992. Wilkie also led the excavation of the Egyptian site of Kom Dahab in the Nile Delta. Between 1985 and 1996, she directed the Grevena archaeological project, a large-scale field survey project in northern Greece.

Wilkie was active in the field of cultural heritage management, serving on the AIA's Conservation and Site Protection Committee and helping to establish the US committee of Blue Shield International, an organization dedicated to protecting cultural remains. She was appointed to the Cultural Property Advisory Committee, a body which advises the President of the United States on matters to do with cultural heritage, from 2003 until 2017. She retired from Carleton College in Minnesota, at which she taught for her entire career, in 2013, and died in 2021.

== Early life and education ==
Nancy Clausen Wilkie was born in Milwaukee, Wisconsin, on 27 December 1942. She graduated from Stanford University with a BA in Classics in 1964. In the same year, she moved to the University of Minnesota to undertake a Master's degree in Ancient Greek, and subsequently completed a Ph.D. in Greek with a minor in history at the same institution in 1975.

=== University of Minnesota Messenia Expedition ===
Map of the southwest Peloponnese, Greece, showing the approximate area and key sites surveyed by the University of Minnesota Messenia Expedition.

As a graduate student at the University of Minnesota, Wilkie joined the University of Minnesota Messenia Expedition (UMME) in 1968, alongside Nancy Spencer, another graduate student. The expedition had grown out of field surveys conducted by Bill McDonald from 1953, joined by Richard Hope Simpson from 1959 and, from 1961, by a wider range of specialists under the UMME name. It aimed to expand the known corpus of archaeological sites in Messenia, particularly from the Mycenaean period, and to draw conclusions about the distribution and nature of settlements between the comparatively-few well-excavated sites in the region.

Wilkie received her training in excavation techniques during her time with the UMME, at the hands of Hope Simpson. She worked on the UMME until 1975, serving as a trench supervisor on the excavation of Nichoria in 1972 and 1973.

Wilkie's PhD thesis was entitled A Tholos Tomb at Nichoria: Its Construction and Use, and was supervised by McDonald. She later co-edited the second volume of the excavation publication from Nichoria, along with McDonald. Reviewing the publication in the American Journal of Archaeology, the archaeologist Patrick M. Thomas called Wilkie's chapter on the Nichoria tholos "a fine piece of scholarship, and … a reminder that much can be done even with the 'scraps' of a plundered tomb". After Wilkie's death in 2021, Jack Davies listed the publication of the results of the excavation of Nichoria as one of her chief achievements.

== Academic career ==
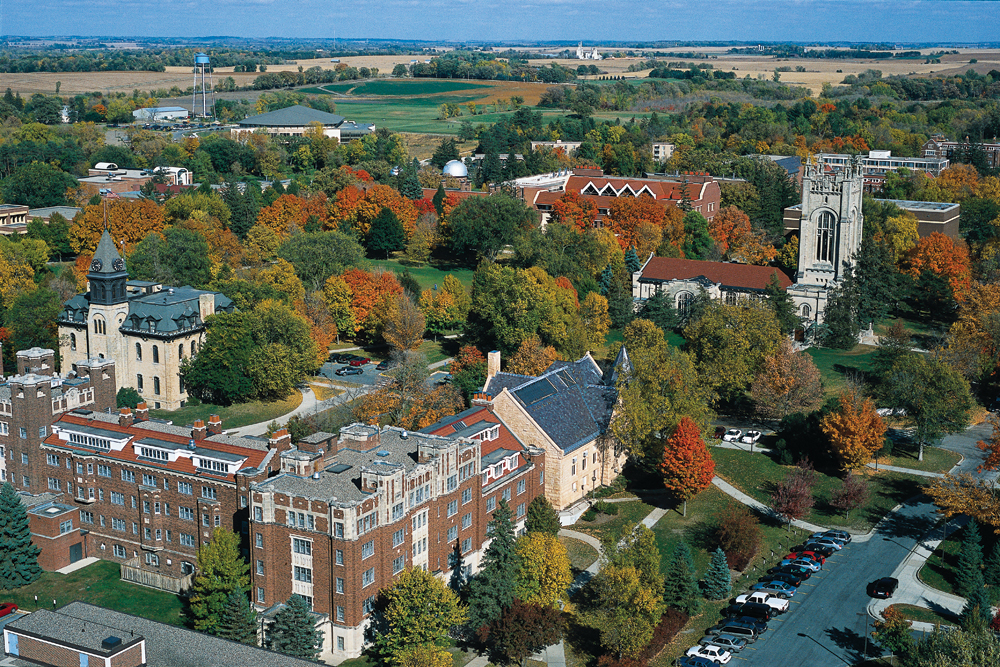
Carleton College in Northfield, Minnesota, where Wilkie spent her entire teaching career.

In 1974, while still a graduate student, Wilkie began teaching anthropology as an adjunct professor at Carleton College, a liberal arts college in Minnesota. In 1993, she was made Professor of Classics and Anthropology at the same institution, followed by the title of William H. Laird Professor of Classics, Anthropology and the Liberal Arts in 2001. Her teaching included the language, literature, history and archaeology of Ancient Greece, as well as Mediterranean archaeology and human prehistory. During her time at Carleton, she established and directed the college's program in archaeology.

She was part of the Phokis–Doris Expedition, led by Edward W. Kase, which ran from the early 1970s until 1980. The expedition explored what its team termed 'The Great Isthmus Corridor', a route from Cirrha on the Gulf of Corinth to Aspledon on the Gulf of Euboea. The expedition carried out field survey and discovered numerous ancient sites in western Phokis and the Kephissos Valley. (Note: For Wilkie's participation, see Moore 2021, p. 658; for the expedition's dates and scope, see Fossey 1992, p. 255.) Publication and study of the expedition's findings continued into the 1990s: Wilkie spent part of the 1998–1999 season cataloguing the materials in the Amfissa museum, in collaboration with John Rosser.

Wilkie collaborated with William D.E. Coulson, another UMME alumnus, on a survey of the south-western Nile Delta, which ran between 1977 and 1983. The expedition surveyed around 800 square kilometres (310 sq mi) of area, and has been called "the most significant archaeological exploration of the region". As part of the project, Wilkie led the excavation of the site of Kom Dahab, a site near Naucratis dating to the Old Kingdom period (c. 2700 – c. 2200 BCE), which became a significant centre for ceramic production in the Ptolemaic period (305 – 30 BCE). The work at Kom Dahab began with the collection of surface potsherds and the digging of trial trenches, and discovered a kiln through the use of magneometry in 1982.

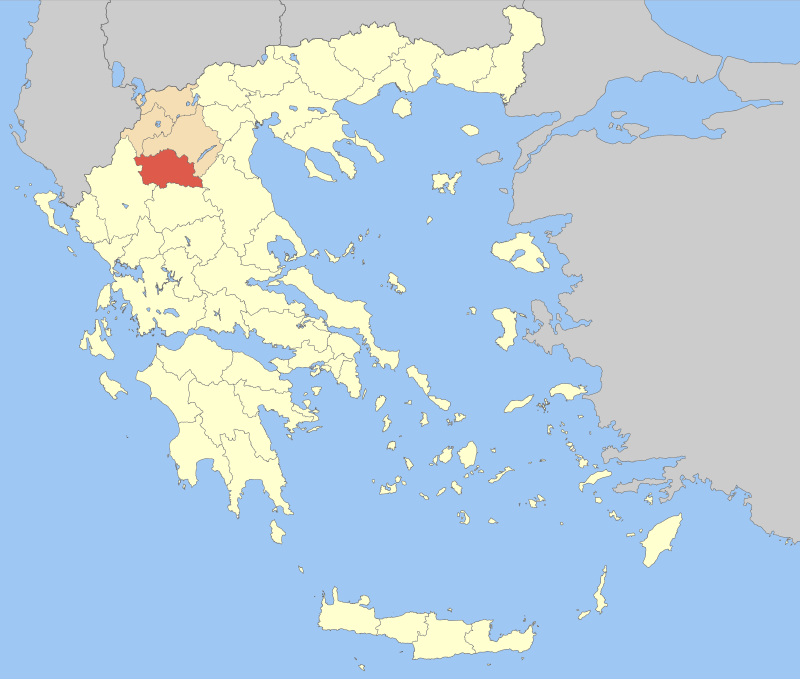
The prefecture (Greek: νομός, romanized: nomos) of Grevena, shaded in dark orange.

From 1985 to 1996, she was director of the Grevena Project, an interdisciplinary collaboration of archaeologists, geologists and anthropologists in the prefecture of Grevena in the southwestern part of Greek Macedonia. In a 1993 article, Wilkie described the region as having previously been archaeological terra incognita, without systematic survey or excavations. Under Wilkie's direction, the Grevena expedition surveyed around 2,500 square kilometres (250,000 ha) of land. In a similar vein to the University of Minnesota Messenia Expedition, the Grevena Project took a diachronic approach and included study of the modern culture and farming practises of the region, carried out by Stanley Aschenbrenner (with whom Wilkie had worked at Nichoria) as well as Harold Coster and Claudia Chang.

She served on the management committee of the American School of Classical Studies at Athens, as chair of its committee on excavations and surveys, and as chair of the committee of its Wiener Laboratory. In 1989 and 1991, she conducted fieldwork in Nepal, and later carried out archaeological work in Sri Lanka.

=== Archaeological Institute of America ===
Wilkie joined the Minnesota society of the Archaeological Institute of America in the 1970s, and was its president twice in the 1970s and 1980s. She subsequently joined the national governing board of the AIA as an academic trustee in 1989, and served on its committees for professional responsibilities, Eastern Europe and capital campaigns. In 1994, she became its first vice-president, before being elected as president of the society to serve from 1998 until 2002.

After the end of her term as president, Wilkie joined two of the AIA's committees: the Lecture Program and the Conservation and Site Preservation Committee, later becoming chair of the latter as well as chair of the AIA's Tour Advisory Board.

=== Blue Shield ===
Wilkie was a co-founder of the US Committee of Blue Shield International, an organisation dedicated to the protection of cultural heritage from war and natural disaster. She became the secretary of that committee in 2006 and served as its president from 2013 until 2020. She was also elected to the board of Blue Shield International between 2014 and 2020.

=== Cultural Property Advisory Committee ===
In 2003, Wilkie was appointed by George W. Bush to the Cultural Property Advisory Committee, an 11-member committee which advises the President of the United States on matters regarding the import of antiquities. She was re-appointed by Bush in 2005, and subsequently by Barack Obama in 2011 and 2017. She became the committee's longest-serving member.

== Personal life ==
Wilkie was married to Craig Anderson. She was a keen sailor, owning a boat on Lake Superior named Tiamat, after the Babylonian goddess of the sea.

== Retirement and death ==
Wilkie retired from Carleton College in 2013. She died of cancer in 2021.

== Honors ==
The American Archaeological Institute's biannual Nancy C. Wilkie Lecture in Archaeological Heritage was inaugurated in her honor in 2003. In 2010, she was chosen as the Charles Eliot Norton Memorial lecturer, an appointment described by the AIA as "one of the highest honors [it] can bestow".

In 2021, she was awarded the AIA's Outstanding Public Service Award. Announcing the award, the Institute described her as "a tireless champion for preservation of the archaeological heritage in the public, governmental and academic spheres", and judged that "few have given greater public service in the preservation of archaeological heritage world-wide".

== Selected publications ==
- Wilkie, Nancy C.; Coulson, William D.E., eds. (1985). Contributions to Aegean Archaeology: Studies in Honor of William A. McDonald. Dubuque: Kendall Hunt. ISBN 978-0-8403-3526-5.
- Wilkie, Nancy C.; Savina, Mary E. (1997). "The Earliest Farmers in Macedonia". Antiquity. 71 (271): 201–207. doi:10.1017/S0003598X00084714. S2CID 163232028.
- Kase, Edward W.; Wilkie, Nancy C., eds. (1991). The Great Isthmus Corridor Route: Explorations of the Phokis–Doris Expedition. Dubuque: Kendall Hunt. ISBN 978-0-8403-6538-5.
- McDonald, William A.; Wilkie, Nancy C., eds. (1992). Excavations at Nichoria in Southwest Greece II: The Bronze Age Occupation. Minneapolis: University of Minnesota Press. ISBN 978-0-8166-1935-1.
- Wilkie, Nancy C. (1975). A Tholos Tomb at Nichoria: Its Construction and Use (Ph.D. thesis). University of Minnesota.
- — (1993). "The Grevena Project". Ancient Macedonia V: Papers Read at the Fifth International Symposium Held in Thessaloniki, October 10–15, 1989: Manolis Andronikos In Memoriam. Vol. 3. Thessaloniki: Institute for Balkan Studies. pp. 1747–1755.
- — (2008). "Governmental Agencies and the Protection of Cultural Property in Times of War". In Rothfield, Lawrence (ed.). Antiquities under Siege: Cultural Heritage Protection after the Iraq War. Lanham: Altamira Press. pp. 237–248. ISBN 978-0-7591-1098-4.
- — (2009). "Colonization and Its Effect on the Cultural Property of Libya". In Nafziger, James A.R.; Nicgorski, Ann M. (eds.). Cultural Heritage Issues: The Legacy of Conquest, Colonization and Commerce. Leiden: Brill. pp. 169–183. doi:10.1163/ej.9789004160361.i-466.56.

== Bibliography ==
- Archaeological Institute of America (2022). "Outstanding Public Service Award". Archived from the original on 2022-12-08.
- Archaeological Institute of America (2021a). "Archaeologists You Should Know: Nancy Wilkie". Archived from the original on 2023-03-12.
- Archaeological Institute of America (2021-01-29). "In Memoriam: Nancy Wilkie". Archived from the original on 2023-03-12.
- Blackman, David (1999). "Archaeology in Greece 1998–99". Archaeological Reports. 45: 1–124, 192. doi:10.1017/S0570608400002842. JSTOR 580978. S2CID 131481389.
- "Carl Quiz: Nancy Wilkie". Carleton College Voice. Carleton College. 2013-08-08. Archived from the original on 2023-03-17.
- Coulson, William D.E.; Leonard Jr., Albert; Wilkie, Nancy C. (1982). "Three Seasons of Excavations and Survey at Naukratis and Environs". Journal of the American Research Center in Egypt. 19: 73–109. doi:10.2307/40000435. JSTOR 40000435.
- Coulson, William D.E.; Leonard Jr., Albert (1982). "The Naukratis Project: 1982" (PDF). Muse: Annual of the Museum of Art and Archaeology (16): 44–49. Archived from the original (PDF) on 2023-03-21.
- Dyson, Stephen L. (1998). "From the President: Hail and Farewell". Archaeology. Vol. 51, no. 6. p. 6. JSTOR 41771446.
- Fossey, John M. (1992). "The Great Isthmus Corridor Route: Explorations of the Phokis-Doris Expedition ed. by Edward W. Caset, et al. (review)". Échos du Monde Classique. 36 (2): 225–227.
- Fure-Slocum, Carolyn (2021-05-03). "Farewells: Nancy Wilkie". Office of the Chaplian. Carleton University. Archived from the original on 2023-03-11.
- Greenberg, Bayle Z., ed. (15 November 1962). "University of Minnesota Staff Bulletin" (PDF). University of Minnesota Staff Bulletin.
- "The Western Nile Delta: The American Survey in the Region of Naukratis and Kom Firin". Shelby White and Leon Levy Program for Archaeological Publications. Harvard University. 2015. Archived from the original on 2023-03-21.
- Masson-Berghoff, Aurelia (2021). "In the Land of the Tjehenu: Kom Dahab, an Unknown Old Kingdom Settlement in the Western Nile Delta" (PDF). Newsletter: Egypt and Sudan (7–8). British Museum: 23. Archived from the original (PDF) on 2023-03-22.
- McDonald, William; Shay, Creighton Thomas; Wilkie, Nancy; Hope Simpson, Richard; Coulson, William D.E.; Donovan, William P.; Blitzer, Harriet; Rosser, J.; Aschenbrenner, Stanley; Howell, R.J.; Dickinson, Oliver T.P.K.; Hughes-Brock, Helen; Wade, William D.; Wolberg, Donald L.; Grady, Fredrick V.; Sloan, Robert E.; Shay, Jennifer; Rapp, George; Cooke, S.R.B. (1975). "Excavations at Nichoria in Messenia: 1972–1973". Hesperia. 44 (1): 69–141. JSTOR 147426.
- McDonald, William; Hope Simpson, Richard (1969). "Further Explorations in Southwestern Peloponnese: 1964–1968". American Journal of Archaeology. 73 (2): 123–177. doi:10.2307/502778. JSTOR 502778. S2CID 191396062.
- McDonald, William; Hope Simpson, Richard (1964). "Further Exploration in Southwestern Peloponnese: 1962–1963". American Journal of Archaeology. 68 (3): 229–245. doi:10.2307/502386. JSTOR 502386. S2CID 191378537.
- McDonald, William A.; Wilkie, Nancy C., eds. (1992). Excavations at Nichoria in Southwest Greece II: The Bronze Age Occupation. Minneapolis: University of Minnesota Press. ISBN 978-0-8166-1935-1.
- McDonald, William A. (1984). "The Minnesota Messenia Survey: A Look Back". Studies Presented to Sterling Dow on His Eightieth Birthday. Durham, North Carolina: Duke University. pp. 185–192.
- McInerney, Jeremy (2000). The Folds of Parnassos: Land and Ethnicity in Ancient Phokis. New York: University of Texas Press. doi:10.7560/752290. ISBN 978-0-292-76160-5.
- Moore, Andrew M.T. (2021). "Nancy C. Wilkie, 1942–2021". American Journal of Archaeology. 125 (4): 657–660. doi:10.3764/aja.125.4.0657. S2CID 239020557.
- Thomas, Patrick M. (1994). "Reviewed Work(s): Excavations at Nichoria in Southwest Greece II: The Bronze Age Occupation by William A. McDonald and Nancy C. Wilkie". American Journal of Archaeology. 98 (1): 165–167. doi:10.2307/506229. JSTOR 506229.
