= William Andrew McDonald =

Canadian archaeologist (1913–2000)

- Photographed c. 1990
- Born: April 26, 1913; Ontario, Canada
- Died: January 11, 2000 (aged 86); Washburn, Wisconsin
- Awards: Gold Medal of the Archaeological Institute of America

Academic background
- Education: American School of Classical Studies, Athens
- Alma mater: University of Toronto, Johns Hopkins University
- Thesis: The Political Meeting Places of the Greeks (1940)

Academic work
- Discipline: Archaeology
- Institutions: Lehigh University, University of Texas, Moravian College, University of Minnesota

William Andrew "Bill" McDonald (April 26, 1913 – January 11, 2000) was a Canadian archaeologist. Educated at the University of Toronto and at Johns Hopkins University, he took part in the early excavations of Carl Blegen at the Mycenaean site known as the "Palace of Nestor" at Pylos, where he excavated the first Linear B tablets discovered in mainland Greece.

At Blegen's instigation, McDonald began in 1953 to carry out field survey in the region of Messenia around Pylos, aiming to discover further Mycenaean sites which may have formed part of Pylos's territory in the Late Bronze Age. He began working with his long-term collaborator Richard Hope Simpson in 1958, and the two expanded their efforts into the University of Minnesota Messenia Expedition between 1961 and 1975. As part of the UMME, he directed the excavations of Nichoria, an important archaeological site considered a testing-ground for the methods of processual archaeology in Greece.

McDonald spent most of his career at the University of Minnesota, where he worked between 1948 and his retirement in 1980. He received several awards, both for his archaeological research and for his university teaching. His publications include a popular history of Mycenaean archaeology as well as academic works.

== Life ==
William Andrew McDonald was born in Ontario, Canada. In 1935, he graduated from the University of Toronto (where he also played rugby union and hockey) with first-class honors in classical studies. In 1936, McDonald received his master's degree in ancient history from the same university. He studied classical archaeology at Johns Hopkins University and received his Ph.D. in 1940. His dissertation, entitled The Political Meeting Places of the Greeks, was still regarded as an important fundamental study of Ancient Greek public architecture into the twenty-first century.

From 1938 until 1939, McDonald was a student of the American School of Classical Studies in Athens and participated in excavations of the "Palace of Nestor" at Pylos and at Olynthos. At Pylos, he was placed in charge of supervising the day-to-day excavation by Carl Blegen, and was on hand when the first Linear B tablets were discovered at the site on April 3, 1939; along with Blegen, he spent several days excavating them by hand, receiving his director's tribute in the excavation write-up for his "circumspection, perseverance and long-suffering in spending so many days on his hands and knees in positions of extreme discomfort." These were the first Linear B tablets discovered on the mainland of Greece. McDonald returned to Pylos when excavations, interrupted by the outbreak of war in Europe, resumed in 1952, and remained until 1953, when Blegen convinced him to focus his efforts towards surveying the territory comprising the Late Bronze Age kingdom of Pylos. During this time, McDonald undertook his first of many interdisciplinary projects whereby he collected modern place-names across southwest Greece.

In 1958, McDonald began to collaborate with Richard Hope Simpson, who was then conducting an archaeological survey of Laconia. In 1961, McDonald led the establishment of the University of Minnesota Messenia Expedition, which emphasized the interdisciplinary rather than multidisciplinary collaboration between archaeologists, natural scientists, social scientists, and anthropologists. The expedition resulted in 1,400 square miles (3,600 km^{2}) of territory being surveyed. The results of the overall expedition were published in preliminary reports in the American Journal of Archaeology and in a comprehensive volume entitled The Minnesota Messenia Expedition: Reconstructing a Bronze Age Regional Environment.

From 1969 until 1975, McDonald concentrated his efforts towards the excavations at Nichoria, which was a significant Late Bronze Age and early Iron Age settlement in Messenia. McDonald chose Nichoria because he believed that it was time for archaeologists to research more ordinary ancient remains rather than focus on recovering monumental sculptures, architecture, and other artistic artifacts that usually end up being displayed in museums. McDonald's work at Nichoria first appeared in preliminary reports published in Hesperia, the journal of the American School of Classical Studies at Athens. The full details of McDonald's work were published in three volumes entitled Excavations at Nichoria in Southwest Greece. For his scholarly work, McDonald was awarded Guggenheim Fellowships in 1958 and in 1967. He was also interested in communicating to the general public about the excitement of archaeology. His account of Bronze Age archaeology in Greece entitled Progress into the Past: The Rediscovery of Mycenaean Civilization was written from both an historical and a biographical standpoint. The book was successful, and was updated and reissued in 1990.

From 1939 until 1943, McDonald taught at Lehigh University in Bethlehem, Pennsylvania, moving to the University of Texas from 1945 until 1946 and to Moravian College in Bethlehem from 1946 until 1948. He joined the faculty of the Department of Classics at the University of Minnesota in 1948 and maintained his position there until his retirement in 1980. Moreover, he was instrumental in establishing the Honors Division of the College of Liberal Arts and served as its first director from 1964 until 1967. For his significant contributions to undergraduate education, McDonald was awarded the Standard Oil–Horace T. Morse Award in 1967. McDonald was always interested in exploring and developing new teaching methods and decided near the end of his career to stop lecturing and to focus instead on class discussions. He believed that lectures were merely "a means of getting information from a professor's notes to the students' notes without going through the heads of either.

In 1973, McDonald was appointed as Regents' Professor of Classical Studies, which was the University of Minnesota's highest award. Shortly afterward, he contributed to establishing the Center for Ancient Studies, which was an interdisciplinary graduate program in archaeology that was an extension of the Minnesota Messenia Expedition. He served as its first director from 1974 until 1979. The Archaeological Institute of America awarded McDonald the Gold Medal for Distinguished Archaeological Achievement in 1981 citing him as a "pathfinder" who "pioneered in bringing about changes in the theory, methodology and general conduct of archaeological research in Greece."

McDonald died in Washburn, Wisconsin on January 11, 2000. To honor his memory, many of his friends, colleagues, and students established the William A. McDonald Lectureship in Aegean Prehistory as part of the National Lecture Program of the Archaeological Institute of America.

== Published works (selection) ==
- McDonald, William A. (1966). "Some Suggestions on Directions and a Modest Proposal". Hesperia: The Journal of the American School of Classical Studies at Athens. 35 (4): 413–418. JSTOR 147569.
- McDonald, William A. (1972). "Excavations at Nichoria in Messenia: 1969-71". Hesperia. 41 (2). American School of Classical Studies at Athens: 218–273. JSTOR 147682.
- McDonald, William A. (1991). "Archaeology in the 21st century: six modest recommendations". Antiquity. 65 (249): 829–839. doi:10.1017/S0003598X00080558. S2CID 164012916.

== Sources ==
- Davis, Jack L. (1986). "Contributions to Aegean Archaeology: Studies in Honor of William A. McDonald. By Nancy C. Wilkie and William D. E. Coulson". American Journal of Archaeology. 90 (3): 357. doi:10.2307/505703. JSTOR 505703.
- Judson, Anna P. (2020). The Undeciphered Signs of Linear B: Interpretation and Scribal Practices. Cambridge University Press. doi:10.1017/9781108859745. ISBN 9781108859745. Archived from the original on 2023-03-03.
- Kourouniotis, Konstantinos; Blegen, Carl (1939). "Excavations at Pylos, 1939". American Journal of Archaeology. 43 (4): 557–576. doi:10.2307/498982. JSTOR 498982. S2CID 193102694.
- Wilkie, Nancy C. (2000). "William Andrew McDonald, 1913-2000". American Journal of Archaeology. 104 (2): 309–310. doi:10.1086/AJS507453. S2CID 245265134.
