= Jack L. Davis =

Classical archaeologist

Jack Davis
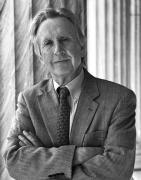
- Jack L. Davis
- Born: Jack Lee Davis; August 13, 1950 (age 75); Apple Creek, Ohio
- Occupation: Classical archaeologist
- Spouse: Sharon Stocker

Jack L. Davis (born August 13, 1950) is Carl W. Blegen Professor of Greek Archaeology at the University of Cincinnati in Ohio and is a former director of the American School of Classical Studies at Athens.

== Brief biography ==
Jack L. Davis has directed or co-directed regional archaeological projects in several areas of Greece, including the Nemea Valley, the island of Keos, and Messenia near the Palace of Nestor (Pylos Regional Archaeological Project). In addition he has directed regional studies and excavations in Albania in the hinterlands of the ancient Greek colonies of Dyrrachium/Epidamnos and Apollonia. Davis is a recognized authority in the archaeology of the Aegean Islands. He has published reports on excavations on the islands of Keos (at Ayia Irini) and Melos (at Phylakopi).

Davis is the author of "Review of Aegean Prehistory: The Islands of the Aegean" in Aegean Prehistory: A Review, a collection of papers edited by Tracey Cullen for the Archaeological Institute of America. He has also contributed to the Cambridge Companion to the Aegean Bronze Age (2008) and to the Oxford Handbook of Aegean Prehistory (2010). In addition to prehistoric topics his research interests include the history and archaeology of Greece in the Ottoman and early modern periods and the relationship between the history of Classical archaeology and national movements in the Balkans. He is an occasional contributor to "The Archivist's Notebook."

Davis is a Fellow of the Society of Antiquaries of London, a Corresponding Member of the German Archaeological Institute, and has served on advisory boards of the American Journal of Archaeology, Hesperia (journal), and Sheffield Studies in Aegean Prehistory, among other journals. Since 1993 his primary academic appointment has been in the Department of Classics of the University of Cincinnati, where he is Carl W. Blegen Professor of Greek Archaeology. From 2007-2012 he was on leave from that post to direct the American School of Classical Studies at Athens, Greece. In 2012 he was elected to the Institutional Council of the National and Capodistrian University of Athens. In 2016 he was a co-recipient of the Premio Giuseppe Scicca in Archaeology, jointly with Sharon R. Stocker. In 2017 he received the medal for Special Civil Merits from the Republic of Albania. He has been awarded the Gold Medal Award for Distinguished Archaeological Achievement for 2020 by the Archaeological Institute of America. In 2021 Davis was made a Commander of the Order of the Phoenix (Greece) by the President of Greece. He has been an honorary member of the Archaeological Society of Athens since 2021. In 2024 Davis was elected to membership in the American Academy of Arts and Sciences. In 2025 Davis was awarded the Athens Prize by the trustees of the American School of Classical Studies at Athens. Davis was also awarded a Faculty of the Year Award for 2024-2025 from the Big 12 Athletic Conference.

== History of research ==
Davis completed his undergraduate education at the University of Akron in 1972, where he first studied public speaking, theater, and radio broadcasting, then Latin, Greek, ancient Egyptian history and language, and ancient history. In the autumn of 1972, he began post-graduate studies at the University of Cincinnati under the supervision of John L. Caskey and Gerald Cadogan. As a student he had the opportunity to work with Cadogan at Knossos and with Caskey at Ayia Irini on the Cycladic island of Keos.

From 1974-76, Davis was in Greece, as a student at the American School of Classical Studies in Athens, where he held in successive years the James Rignall Wheeler and Eugene Vanderpool fellowships. In Athens he met John Cherry, then a graduate student at the University of Southampton, and, through him, later had the opportunity to study finds from the recent British excavations at Phylakopi on the Cycladic island of Melos and to learn the methods and aims of systematic intensive archaeological surface survey.

After completing his Ph.D., Davis taught at the University of Illinois at Chicago until 1993, under the auspices of which, in the early 1980s, he organized two intensive surveys with Cherry, one on the island of Keos (1983-1984), the other in the Nemea Valley (1984-1989), as part of the Nemea Valley Archaeological Project, directed by James C. Wright of Bryn Mawr College. The results of the former, presented in a monograph co-authored with Eleni Mantzourani, constituted one of the first fully published presentations of the results of an intensive archaeological survey in the Mediterranean.

At the same time, he completed publication of excavated finds from the later Middle Bronze Age at Ayia Irini.

In 1990, Davis, together with colleagues from the Nemea and Keos surveys, organized the Pylos Regional Archaeological Project, an exploration of areas of the western Peloponnese near the Mycenaean Palace of Nestor at Pylos in the province of Messenia. The project was sponsored by the University of Cincinnati, the University of Wisconsin-Madison, the University of Texas at Austin, and the University of Michigan. Investigations were completed in 1996 and results have been extensively discussed in a series of articles in Hesperia, journal of the American School of Classical Studies at Athens, and in a book, Sandy Pylos (also available in Greek translation). Most recently the results were reviewed in The Pylos Regional Archaeological Project: A Retrospective (American School of Classical Studies at Athens 2018).

In 1994, after joining the faculty of Classics at the University of Cincinnati, Davis and his wife, Sharon Stocker, traveled to Albania for the first time. In 1996, plans to begin an intensive archaeological survey in the hinterland of the Greek colony of Apollonia, co-directed with Muzafer Korkuti, director of the Institute of Archaeology in Tirana, were interrupted by the collapse of pyramid banking schemes and the ensuing chaos. Subsequently, fieldwork was conducted from 1998-2003 at Apollonia, in 2002 in the hinterland of Dyrrachium/Epidamnos, and the remains of a hitherto unknown Greek temple were investigated in three campaigns of excavation in 2004-2006.

Problems in interpreting medieval and post-medieval archaeological remains led Davis to explore, together with colleagues Siriol Davies, Fariba Zarinebaf, and John Bennet, previously underexploited documentary sources that can be employed for reconstructing a social and economic history for Greece during periods of Venetian and Ottoman occupation, particularly in the 17th and 18th centuries.

While serving as director of the American School of Classical Studies at Athens, Davis’s research was focused on analysis and publication of his fieldwork. He also continued to pursue the study of the institutional history of foreign schools of archaeology in Greece and assisted his wife in publishing unpublished finds from Carl W. Blegen’s excavations at the Palace of Nestor.

Since 2015, Davis and Stocker have directed renewed excavations at the Palace of Nestor, uncovering a Bronze Age shaft tomb, (later named the Griffin Warrior Tomb), on May 28, 2015. In 2018 they discovered two new monumental beehive tombs at Pylos. Various finds from their excavations are included in an exhibition that has traveled to the Museum of Messenia in Kalamata, Greece, to the Getty Villa in Los Angeles, and to the Hellenic National Museum at Athens in the course of 2025-2026.

== Books ==
- The Kingdom of Pylos: Warrior-Princes of Mycenaean Greece (Los Angeles 2025). Ed. with Sharon R. Stocker, Claire Lyons, and Evangelia Militsi-Kechayia. Also in Greek by Melissa Press (Athens 2025)
- A Sanctuary in the Hora of Illyrian Apollonia: Excavations at the Bonjakët Site (2004-2006) (Atlanta 2022). Ed. with S.R. Stocker, I. Pojani, and V. Dimo.
- A Greek State in Formation: The Origins of Civilization in Mycenaean Pylos (Oakland 2022). Sharon R. Stocker (Contributor).
- The Pylos Regional Archaeological Project: A Retrospective (Princeton 2018). Ed. with J. Bennet.
- Mycenaean Wall Painting in Context: New Discoveries, Old Finds Reconsidered (Athens 2015). Ed. with H. Brecoulaki and S.R. Stocker
- Carl W. Blegen: Personal and Archaeological Narratives (Atlanta 2015). Ed. with N. Vogeikoff-Brogan and V. Florou.
- Philhellenism, Philanthropy, or Political Convenience: American Archaeology in Greece (Hesperia 82:1 [2013]). Ed. with N. Vogeikoff-Brogan.
- Between Venice and Istanbul: Colonial Landscapes in Early Modern Greece (Princeton: American School of Classical Studies at Athens 2007). Hesperia Supplement 40. Ed. with S. Davies.
- Sandy Pylos: An Archaeological History from Nestor to Navarino (University of Texas Press 1998; Greek Translation 2004; second edition 2007). With S.E. Alcock, J. Bennet, Y. Lolos, C. Shelmerdine, and E. Zangger.
- An Historical and Economic Geography of Ottoman Greece: The Southwestern Morea in the Early 18th Century, Hesperia Supplement 34, American School of Classical Studies at Athens 2005. With F. Zarinebaf and J. Bennet.
- A Guide to the Palace of Nestor, Mycenaean Sites in Its Environs, and the Hora Museum (American School of Classical Studies at Athens 2001). C.W. Blegen and M. Rawson with C.W. Shelmerdine and J.L. Davis.
- Landscape Archaeology as Long-Term History: Northern Keos in the Cycladic Islands (Los Angeles 1991), winner of the Jo Anne Stolaroff Cotsen Prize. With J.F. Cherry and E. Mantzourani.
- Keos V. Ayia Irini: Period V (Mainz 1986)
- Papers in Cycladic Prehistory (Los Angeles 1979). Edited with J.F. Cherry.
