= Cynthia W. Shelmerdine =

American archaeologist

Cynthia Wright Shelmerdine is an American classicist and archaeologist, known for her researches into Mycenaean culture and history. She is Robert M. Armstrong Centennial professor emerita at the University of Texas, Austin.

== Education and career ==
Cynthia Shelmerdine grew up in Cambridge, Massachusetts, where she attended Shady Hill School. She obtained a bachelor's degree in Greek from Bryn Mawr College in 1970 followed by a B.A. (1972) in Classics from the University of Cambridge. She received a doctorate in classical philology from Harvard University in 1977. Her dissertation, guided by Emily Vermeule, was titled Late Helladic IIIA2-IIIB Pottery from Nichoria and the Bronze Age History of Messenia.

From 1977 through to her retirement in 2008, she was a member of the Classics faculty at the University of Texas at Austin. Since 2008, she has been Robert M. Armstrong Centennial professor emerita at the same institution. In 1988 she was the Gertrude Smith Professor at the American School of Classical Studies at Athens directing the Summer Session. In 2011, she was a Peter Warren Visiting Professor at Bristol University.

== Research ==
Shelmerdine has been praised for her integration of archaeological, philological, epigraphic and anthropological data in Mycenaean studies. Her foremost contributions have been to Late Helladic pottery, and the textual and epigraphical study of Linear B.

Between 1972 and 1975, she participated in the excavations at Nichoria and was responsible for its Late Helladic pottery. She was also a co-director at the Pylos Regional Archaeological Project from 1991 to 1996.

=== Pylos ===
Shelmerdine's The Perfume Industry of Mycenaean Pylos (1985) investigated industrial production in Mycenae, establishing Linear B tablets relating to the manufacture of fragrances as an essential source of information on the Mycenaean Bronze Age. She was able to ascertain the sites of production as well as the instruments and containers used. Her analysis included the Zakro palace's room XLVII and the rooms 32 and 38 of the Pylos palace. The fragrances there were made mainly from olive oil, were considered luxury items, and produced under palatial control in a centralised fashion (unlike bronze work, which was decentralised). Every stage of the production process was documented by scribes; indeed, different products appeared to have their own specialist scribes writing the relevant tablets. Shelmerdine documented the ingredients used in several perfumes; these included henna, coriander, myrrh, honey, and "po-ni-ki-jo".

Shelmerdine considered the influence of Mycenaean perfumery on later Greek myth, especially Homeric myths. Mycenaean perfumed oils were exported to Saqqara for use among the Egyptian nobility, but later on took on the role of "ambrosial" clothing for the gods in Homeric hymns.

In the same book, Shelmerdine also documented the earliest known "drugs" in Greek history.

=== Iklaina ===
Shelmerdine worked on the excavations at Iklaina, a secondary site within the Pylos region, as a pottery specialist. Iklaina is surmised to be an independent entity that was subsumed by the Pylian state. Shelmerdine investigated changes in cooking vessels in the period before and after this incorporation. Looking at tripods, griddles and spit supports, she showed that Iklaina's inhabitants underwent some changes in their cooking habits: they decreased their use of tripods, the diversity of cooking pots decreased, becoming more standardised after Iklaina lost its autonomy. She suggested that cooking of meats by private individuals was replaced by banquets organised by palatial elites who arranged the provision of meat.

It had previously been thought that only palatial centres of the Mycenaean culture held records. In 2010, her reading of fired tablets containing writing in Linear B at this location was a surprise. The mechanisms of Mycenaean administration had to be reinterpreted in light of this finding. The clay tablet dated to between 1490 and 1390 BCE, and had not originally been meant to be preserved. Thrown in a rubbish pile, a fire hardened it, thereby preserving it. There was writing on one side, including a number and some indecipherable characters, as well as the names of various men with numbers on the other side. Shelmerdine proposed that this was a personnel list.

It is surmised that Iklaina had a well-developed bureaucracy with scribes, and was probably an administrative centre secondary to the capital towns. Moreover, it raised the question of the extent of literacy in Mycenaean society, as well as how widespread was record-keeping at the lower echelons of Mycenaean bureaucracy.

The finding of other Linear B tablets at Iklaina, detailing the administration of textile production, also tends to weaken the thesis that Mycenaean administration was centralised. As palatial centres show little evidence of textile production, Shelmerdine suggested that the chain of textile manufacture was under a more or less distributed control. Some producers may have had no interaction at all with the palatial centres, while others might have been fully dependent.

== Selected works ==
=== Articles ===
- Cynthia W. Shelmerdine (2012). "Mycenaean Furniture and Vessels: Text and Image". In M.-L. Nosch; R. Laffineur (eds.). KOSMOS: Jewelry, Adornment and Textiles in the Aegean Bronze Age. Liège: Peeters.
- Cynthia W. Shelmerdine (2011). "The Individual and the State in Mycenaean Greece". Bulletin of the Institute of Classical Studies. 54.
- Cynthia W. Shelmerdine (2005). "The World According to Perimos: A Mycenaean Bureaucrat Talks Back". In A. Dakouri-Hild; S. Sherratt (eds.). Autochthon: Papers Presented to Oliver Dickinson on the Occasion of His Retirement. London: British Archaeological Reports.
- Cynthia W. Shelmerdine (1999). "Administration in the Mycenaean Palaces: Where's the Chief?". In M.L. Galaty; W.A. Parkinson (eds.). Floreant Studia Mycenaea. Proceedings of the 10th Mycenaean Colloquium, Salzburg, May 1995. Vienna: Verlag der Österreichischen Akademie der Wissenschaften.
- Cynthia W. Shelmerdine (1997). "Review of Aegean Prehistory VI: The Palatial Bronze Age of the Central and Southern Greek Mainland". American Journal of Archaeology. 101.
- Cynthia W. Shelmerdine (1985). "Pylos Tablets and Archeology". Eirene. 22.
- Cynthia W. Shelmerdine (1975). "Three Homeric Papyri in the Michigan Collection". Bulletin of the American Society of Papyrologists. 12.
- Cynthia W. Shelmerdine (1969). "The Pattern of Guest Welcome in the Odyssey". Classical Journal. 65.

=== Books ===
- Cynthia W. Shelmerdine, ed. (2011). The Cambridge Companion to the Aegean Bronze Age. Cambridge University. ISBN 9780521891271.
- Cynthia W. Shelmerdine (2008). Introduction to Greek. Hackett. ISBN 9781585101849.
- Cynthia W. Shelmerdine; J.L. Davis (2004). A Guide to the Palace of Nestor. American School of Classical Studies.
- Cynthia W. Shelmerdine (1985). The Perfume Industry of Mycenaean Pylos. Paul Åströms Förlag.
- Cynthia W. Shelmerdine; C.A. Rubino (1983). Approaches to Homer. University of Texas.
