= Herb Wright =

American Quaternary scientist (1917 – 2015)

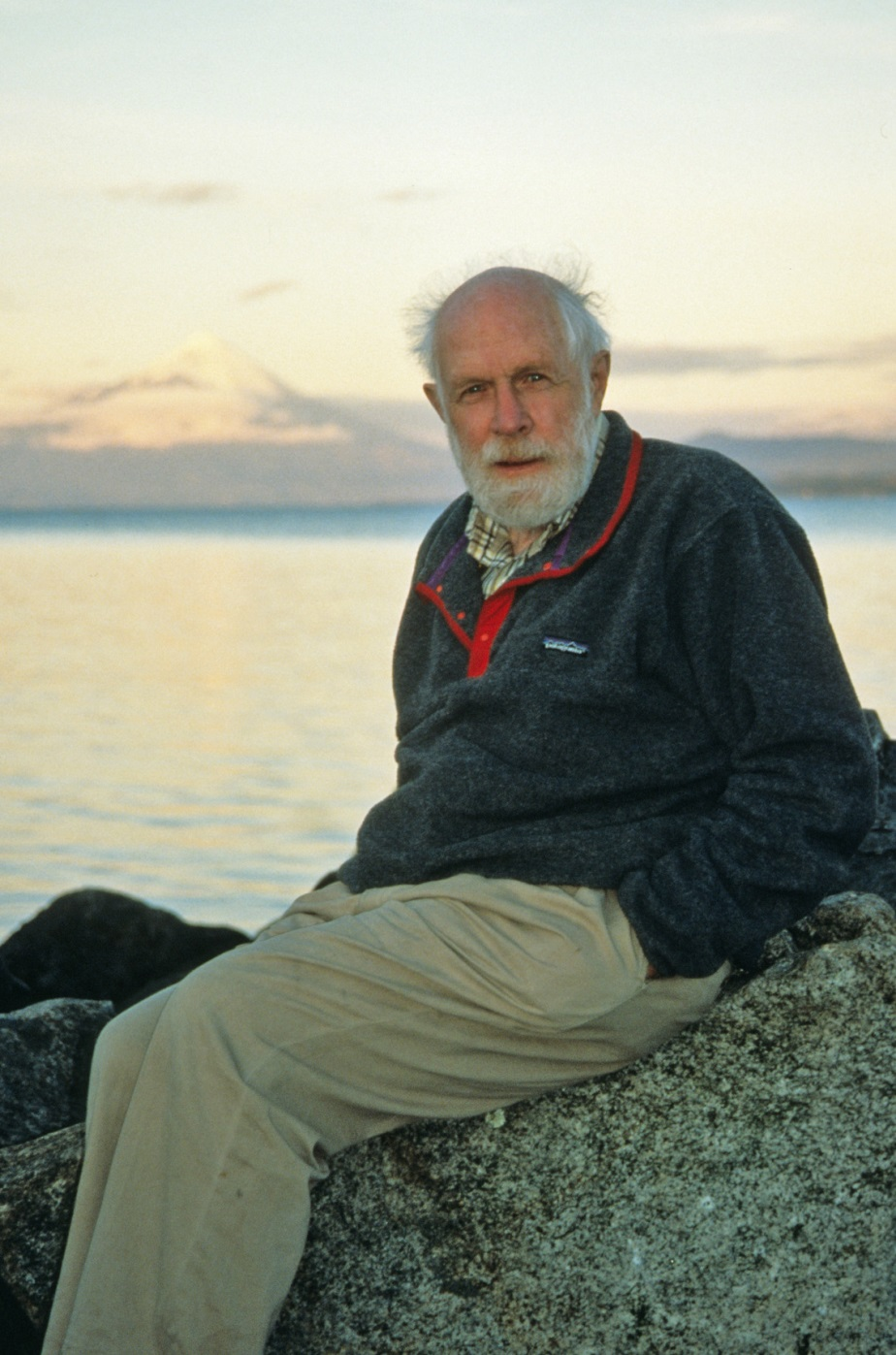
- Born: Herbert Edgar Wright; September 13, 1917; Malden, Massachusetts
- Died: November 12, 2015 (aged 98); Saint Anthony Park, Saint Paul, Minnesota
- Education: Harvard College; Harvard University
- Spouse: Rhea Jan Wright née Hahn (1921-1988)
- Children: 6
- Awards: Pomerance Award, Archaeological Institute of America (1984); Distinguished Career Award, Geological Society of America (1992); Distinguished Career Award, American Quaternary Association (1996); Lifetime Achievement Award, International Paleolimnology Association (2009)
- Scientific career
- Fields: Quaternary science Environmental history Geoarchaeology; Paleoclimatology
- Workplaces: Brown University; University of Minnesota
- Doctoral advisor: Kirk Bryan
- Doctoral students: James Zumberge

Herbert Edgar Wright Jr. (13 September 1917 – 12 November 2015) was an American Quaternary scientist. His research focused on changes in landscape and environment over the past 100,000 years.

Wright's research interests included arid-region geomorphology and landscape evolution, with a focus on glacial geology and climate history. He studied vegetation development and environmental history, analyzing the timing and mechanisms of climate-driven vegetational shifts in North America during the last 18,000 years. He also researched the role of natural fires in the dynamics of northern coniferous forests, and worked on wilderness conservation and landscape management. His work also covered paleoecology, lake development, paleolimnology, and the history and development of patterned peatlands in Minnesota and other areas in the Northern Hemisphere.

Although his work was concentrated in Minnesota, he also participated in synthesizing global paleoclimatology. Beyond Minnesota and the Great Lakes region, Wright conducted research in other parts of North America, the Near East, Europe, Asia, Latin America, and Antarctica.

== Early life and education ==
Wright was born on September 13, 1917, in Malden, Massachusetts. His father, Herbert Edgar Wright Sr., an osteopath, died during the Spanish flu pandemic of 1919. His mother, Annie Mabel Richardson (1878–1964), was a nurse. Wright had an elder sister, Helena (1915–2010), who studied biology.

Wright attended high school in Malden. As a teenager, he earned money cutting grass, selling papers, delivering and selling doughnuts his mother made, and singing in local choirs.

Wright graduated with a BA from Harvard College in 1939 and received his MA and PhD in geology from Harvard University in 1941 and 1943, respectively. His PhD thesis was published in 1946. His PhD advisor and later mentor was Kirk Bryan Sr.

== War service ==
In 1942, during World War II, Wright enlisted as an air cadet in the United States Army Air Corps and became a Boeing B-17 Flying Fortress bomber pilot.

Based in Britain, Wright completed two tours of combat duty and flew 48 missions from 1944 to 1945, including sorties over Germany during D-Day, over Berlin after D-Day, and during the Battle of the Bulge. He served as a pilot, command pilot, and group operations officer, reaching the rank of major.

During Operations Manna and Chowhound (April 29 - May 8, 1945), Wright flew aid drops to the Netherlands. These combined British and American operations delivered an estimated 10,000 tons of rations to survivors of the Dutch Famine (the "hunger winter").

Wright was awarded the Air Medal six times, the Distinguished Flying Cross twice, and the Croix de Guerre from Charles de Gaulle.

== Career ==
After his military service, Wright began teaching at Brown College (now Brown University) in 1945. He moved to the University of Minnesota in September 1947 as an assistant professor in the Department of Geology (which became the Department of Geology and Geophysics in 1962 and is now the Department of Earth Sciences).

He was promoted to associate professor of geology in 1951 and professor of geology in 1959. He was also appointed professor of botany in 1965 and ecology in 1970 within the newly formed Department of Ecology and Evolution and Behavioral Biology (now the Department of Ecology, Evolution, and Behavior) at the University of Minnesota. He was named Regents' Professor of Geology, Ecology, and Botany in 1974 and became Regents' Professor Emeritus in 1988.

After obtaining his PhD, Wright used pollen analysis to reconstruct environmental change and landscape history. With a grant from the Hill Family Foundation (now the Northwest Area Foundation) in 1956, Wright established a pollen laboratory in Minnesota. Wright invited experienced European pollen analysts and paleoecologists to help develop the laboratory and advise students. With a separate grant from the Hill Family Foundation, the Limnological Research Center (LRC) was established in 1959. The pollen laboratory was incorporated into the LRC in 1963, and Wright served as the LRC Director until 1990.

Wright published more than 200 scientific papers and edited 21 books or special issues of journals. He supervised 36 PhD dissertations and 38 MSc or MA theses in the University of Minnesota's Departments of Geology, Ecology, Botany, and its Center for Ancient Studies. He taught, lectured, conducted field work, and advised graduate students and post-doctoral visitors.

Wright formally retired from his Regents’ Professorship in 1988 but continued to participate in lake-coring expeditions to remote locations, including the high Peruvian Andes, Glacier Bay in Alaska, the Azores, the Bulgarian Pirin mountains, the Caucasus of Georgia, and the Siberian Altai. Wright received the Lifetime Achievement Award from the International Paleolimnology Association in 2009 at its meeting in Guadalajara, Mexico.

== Scientific research and legacy ==
Wright's research aimed to reconstruct the late-Quaternary history of various regions and apply these findings to understanding present and future environmental changes.

His contributions included work in geoarchaeology; the glacial, vegetational, and climate history of Minnesota; paleolimnology; The Cooperative Holocene Mapping Project (COHMAP); patterned peatland development; fire ecology and landscape development; and fieldcraft. Wright also invented the Wright square-rod piston corer. A peak is named after him, Wright Peak (1510 m), located 0.9 km south of Sutley Peak in the Jones Mountains, Antarctica (73° 40’ S, 94° 32’ W).

=== Awards and honors ===
- Wenner-Gren Fellow (1951, 1954–55)
- Guggenheim Fellow (1954–55)
- President of the Minnesota Chapter, Archaeological Institute of America (1956–57)
- Secretary, Geomorphological Division, Geological Society of America (1957–61)
- National Research Council Committee for International Quaternary Union (1963–69)
- DSc (Hon), Trinity College Dublin (1966)
- Chairman, Geomorphological Division, Geological Society of America (1967–70)
- President, American Quaternary Association (1971–73)
- Member of the National Academy of Sciences (1977)
- Pomerance Award, Archaeological Institute of America (1984)
- PhD (Hon), Lund University (1987)
- Archaeological Geology Division Award, Geological Society of America (1989)
- Science Achievement Award, Science Museum of Minnesota (1990)
- Distinguished Career Award, Quaternary Geology and Geomorphology Division, Geological Society of America (1992)
- Fryxell Award for Interdisciplinary Studies, Society of American Archaeology (1993)
- DSc (Hon), University of Minnesota (1996)
- Distinguished Career Award, American Quaternary Association (1996)
- Honorary President, International Quaternary Association 16th Congress (2003)
- Lifetime Achievement Award, International Paleolimnology Association (2009)

=== Selected books and special issues ===
- Wright HE and Frey DG (eds). (1965) The Quaternary of the United States. A review volume for the VII Congress of the International Association for Quaternary Research. Princeton, NJ: Princeton University Press, 922 pp.
- Cushing EJ and Wright HE (eds). (1967) Quaternary Paleoecology. Proceedings of the VII Congress of the International Association for Quaternary Research. New Haven: Yale University Press, 440 pp.
- Martin PS and Wright HE (eds). (1967) Pleistocene Extinctions. The Search for a Cause. Proceedings of the VII Congress of the International Association for Quaternary Research. New Haven: Yale University Press, 453 pp.
- Morrison RB and Wright HE (eds). (1967) Quaternary Soils. Proceedings of the VII Congress of the International Association for Quaternary Research. Desert Research Institute, University of Nevada, 338 pp.
- Osburn WH and Wright HE (eds). (1967) Arctic and Alpine Environments. Proceedings of the VII Congress of the International Association for Quaternary Research. Bloomington: Indiana University Press, 308 pp.
- Morrison RB and Wright HE (eds). (1968) Means of Correlation of Quaternary Successions. Proceedings of the VII Congress of the International Association for Quaternary Research. University of Utah Press, 631 pp.
- Wright HE (ed). (1968) Quaternary Geology and Climate. Proceedings of the VII Congress of the International Association for Quaternary Research. National Academy of Sciences, 310 pp.
- Wright HE (ed). (1980) Special Issue: Klutlan Glacier. Quaternary Research 14, 168 pp.
- Wright HE (ed). (1983) Late Quaternary Environments of the United States (2 volumes). Minneapolis: University of Minnesota Press, 407 and 277 pp.
- Velichko AA, Wright HE and Barnosky CW (eds). (1984) Late Quaternary Environments of the Soviet Union. Minneapolis: University of Minnesota Press, 327 pp.
- Ruddiman WF and Wright HE (eds). (1987) North America and Adjacent Oceans During the Last Deglaciation (The Geology of North America, Volume K-3). Geological Society of America, 501 pp.
- Wright HE, Coffin B and Aaseng NE (eds). (1992) The Patterned Peatlands of Minnesota. Minneapolis: University of Minnesota Press, 327 pp.
- Wright HE, Kutzbach JE, Webb T, Ruddiman WF, Street-Perrott FA and Bartlein PJ (eds). (1993) Global Climates Since the Last Glacial Maximum. Minneapolis: University of Minnesota Press, 569 pp.
- Berglund BE, Birks HJB, Ralska-Jasiewiczowa M and Wright HE. (eds). (1996) Palaeoecological Events During the Last 15000 Years: regional syntheses of palaeoecological studies of lakes and mires. Chichester: J. Wiley & Sons, 764 pp.
- Birks HH and Wright HE (eds). (2000) Special Issue: The Reconstruction of the Late-Glacial and Early-Holocene Aquatic Ecosystems in Kråkenes Lake, Norway. Journal of Paleolimnology 23, 115.
- Seltzer GO, Rodbell DT and Wright HE (eds). (2003) Special Issue: Late Quaternary Paleoclimates of the Southern Tropical Andes and Adjacent Regions. Palaeogeography, Palaeoclimatology, Palaeoecology 194, 338 pp.
- Ralska-Jasiewiczowa M, Latalowa M, Wasylikowa K, et al. (2004) Late Glacial and Holocene History of Vegetation in Poland Based on Isopollen Maps, Kraków: W. Szafer Institute of Botany, Polish Academy of Sciences, 444 pp.

== Personal life and death ==
Wright met Rhea Jan Hahn (1921–1988) in the early 1940s while attending church at Harvard University and Radcliffe College. They married on 27 June 1943 while Wright was an air cadet in the Army Air Corps and Rhea was a student at Yale School of Nursing.

Wright regularly conducted scientific fieldwork, including sampling lake sediments, mapping moraines, and studying landscape patterns. After his official retirement, he took annual week-long or fortnight-long canoe trips to the Boundary Waters Canoe Area in northern Minnesota.

Wright died at home in Saint Anthony Park, Saint Paul on 12 November 2015, after a long illness. For the last 14 years of his life, Wright was cared for by his friend and colleague Vania Stefanova.
