= Archaeology (magazine) =

American magazine

- March/April 2008 cover of Archaeology
- Editor in Chief: Jarrett A. Lobell
- Categories: Archaeology, science
- Frequency: Bimonthly
- Publisher: Kevin Quinlan
- Total circulation: 160,906 (2024)
- First issue: 1948; 78 years ago
- Company: Archaeological Institute of America
- Country: United States
- Based in: Long Island City
- Language: English
- Website: www.archaeology.org
- ISSN: 0003-8113

Archaeology is a bimonthly magazine for the general public, published by the Archaeological Institute of America. The institute also publishes the professional American Journal of Archaeology. Its first issue was published in the spring of 1948. The editor-in-chief was Peter Young until 2011 when he was replaced by Claudia Valentino. Jarrett A. Lobell assumed the editorship from Valentino in November 2018.
