= Pylos Regional Archaeological Project =

Study of Bronze Age settlements in southwestern Greece

The Pylos Regional Archaeological Project (or PRAP) is a diachronic and multi-disciplinary archaeological expedition established in 1990. Its purpose is to study the history of prehistoric and historic settlement in southwestern Greece (modern Messenia). The focus of the expedition entails surveying the Bronze Age administrative center known as the Palace of Nestor. Its directors were Professors Jack L. Davis, John Bennet, Susan E. Alcock, Cynthia Shelmerdine, and Yannis Lolos.
