= Nichoria =

Archaeological site in Messenia, Greece

- Νιχώρια (Greek)
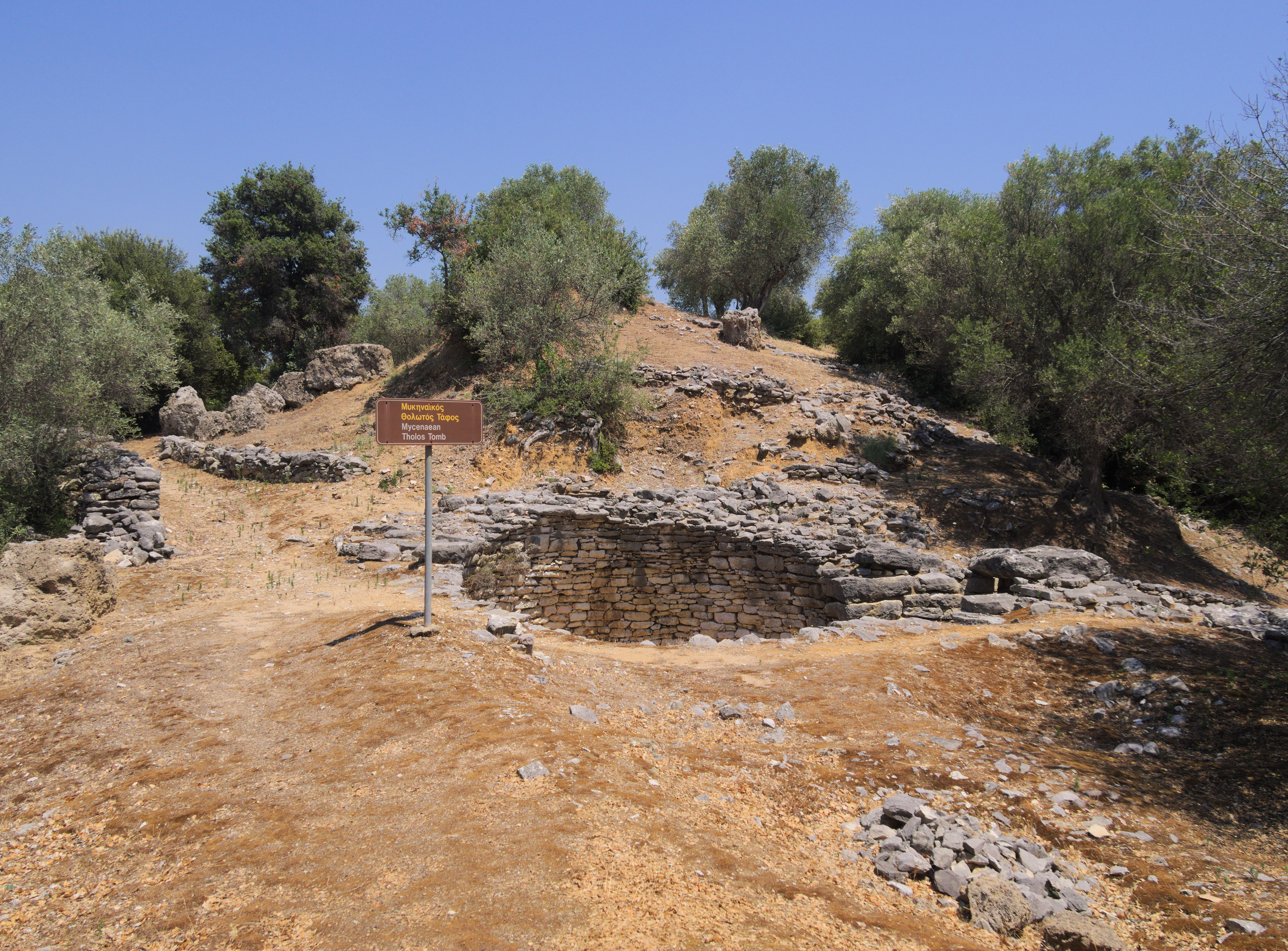

- Location within Peloponnese
- 37°0′12″N 21°54′46″E
- Type: Tholos tomb and settlement
- Periods: LHIIIA:2
- Cultures: Mycenaen
- Satellite of: Pylos
- Location: Messenian Gulf
- Region: Peloponnese

History
- Abandoned: 1100BC

Site notes
- Area: 5
- Condition: Ruined
- Owner: Ministry of Culture and Sport (Greece)
- Public access: Yes

Nichoria (Greek: Νιχώρια) is a site in Messenia, on a ridgetop near modern Rizomylos, at the northwestern corner of the Messenian Gulf. From the Middle to Late Bronze Age it cultivated olive and terebinth for export. During the Helladic period it was part of the Mycenaean civilisation.

Nichoria reached its greatest extent (5 hectares) in LHIIIA:2, and even sported a royal Pylos-style megaron; although it was always smaller. Nichoria became subordinate to Pylos and lost the use of its megaron.

Toward the end of LH IIIB, the palace at Pylos knew Nichoria under the name of TI-MI-TO A-KO. Nichoria was a major outpost of Pylos's "Trans-Aigolaia" province. According to Palaima, "it occurs on ten tablets that relate to: bronze working, six standard items of regional taxation, bronze recycling for weaponry production, coastal defensive arrangements, gold, landholdings, livestock, male personnel, and rather intensive levels of flax production"; and "during the late Bronze Age as much as 10% of the total surface land might have been devoted to olive growth".

Controversy remains over how to transliterate "TI-MI-TO A-KO" into Greek. "TI-MI-TO" has been interpreted as themittos, for "border", comparing Knossos's term "O-U-TE-MI" as a religious ou themis ("not allowed," literally "not set down, in this case 'by law'"). Palaima contrarily reads O-U-TE-MI as a description of furniture, ou termis ("no 'termis', i.e., border or edge"). For Palaima, interpreting the "TI-MI-TO" element in "TI-MI-TO-A-KO" as the genitive of Greek 'themis' is problematical. In Mycenaean, an alternation of i for e is found in words of pre-Greek, not Greek, origin. (Compare Artemitos vs Artimitei.) This would fit taking TI-MI-TO as "tirminthos", for the terebinth tree (pistacia terebinthus) which served as sources for scented resin. "A-KO" meanwhile could mean "agos" for "holy ground" or more likely "agkos" for "hillside" or "glen".

Nichoria was destroyed in the same event which claimed the main palace at Pylos.

The University of Minnesota Messenia Expedition under William Andrew McDonald surveyed the area in the 1960s, and began excavating Nichoria in 1969.

== Archaeological finds ==
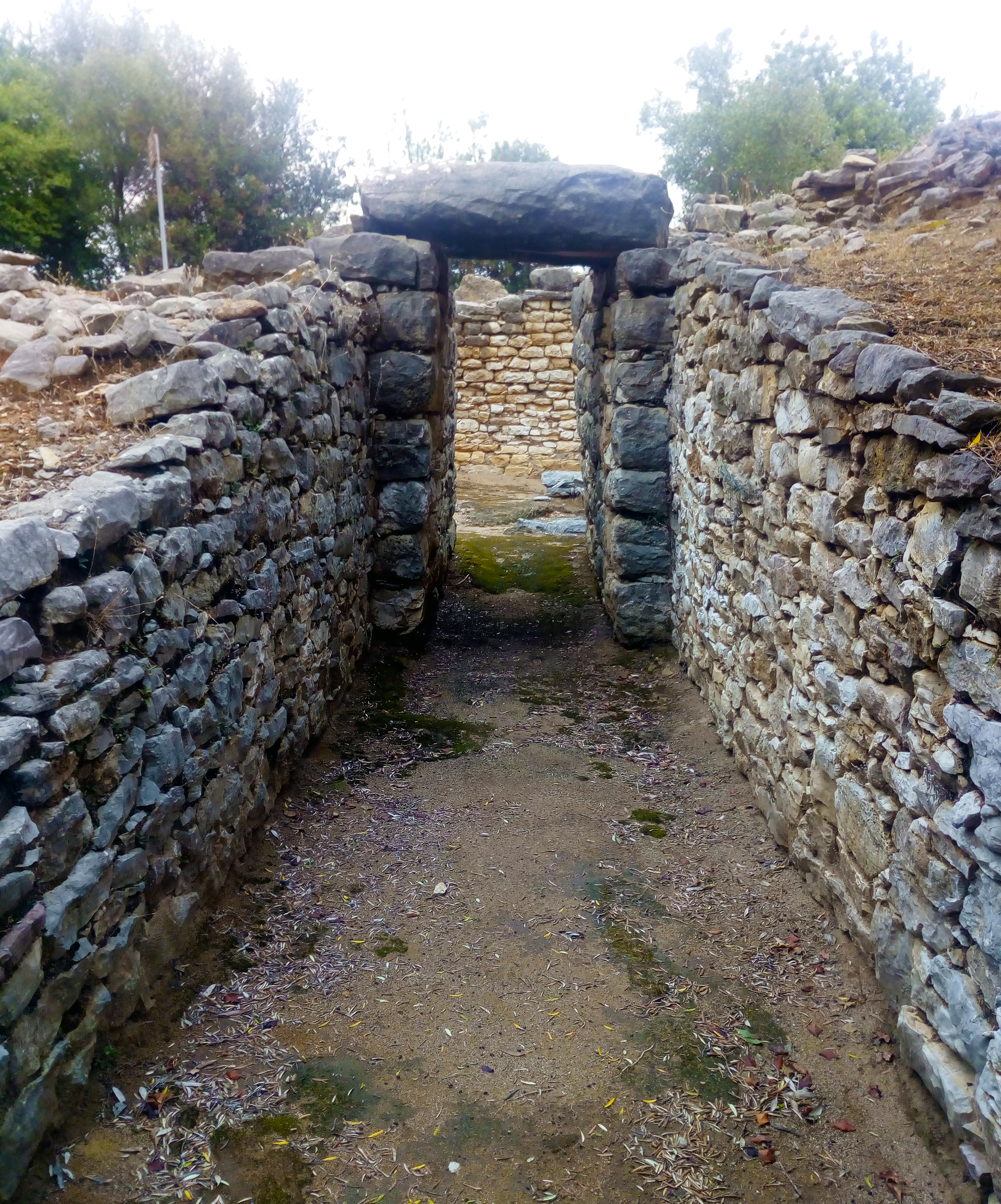
The entrance to the tholos tomb of Nichοria

On the foot of the Nichoria acropolis there was discovered a burial circle, comprising a collective burial of 7 people; it was in use until the LH IIIA period, when the adjacent large tholos tomb was built. The latter, although looted in antiquity, yielded important finds. It had been built at a prominent position on the NW end of the acropolis of Nichoria. Its diameter was 6.60 meters and its height probably exceeded 6.50 meters. It contained four pits. The prominent position of the people buried there is attested also by the lavish grave goods which accompanied them: pottery vessels, sealing gems made of semi-precious stones and little items made of gold, ivory and faience. In a hole between the pits 1 and 2 was discovered a pile of bronze items and vessels, among which a bent sword with an ivory handle. It has been used in the course of the prime time of Nichoria (1400-1200 B.C.). However, there are also traces of use in the late classical and Hellenistic periods, related to the ancestors' cult, a practice particularly familiar in Messenia, but known also in the rest of Greece.

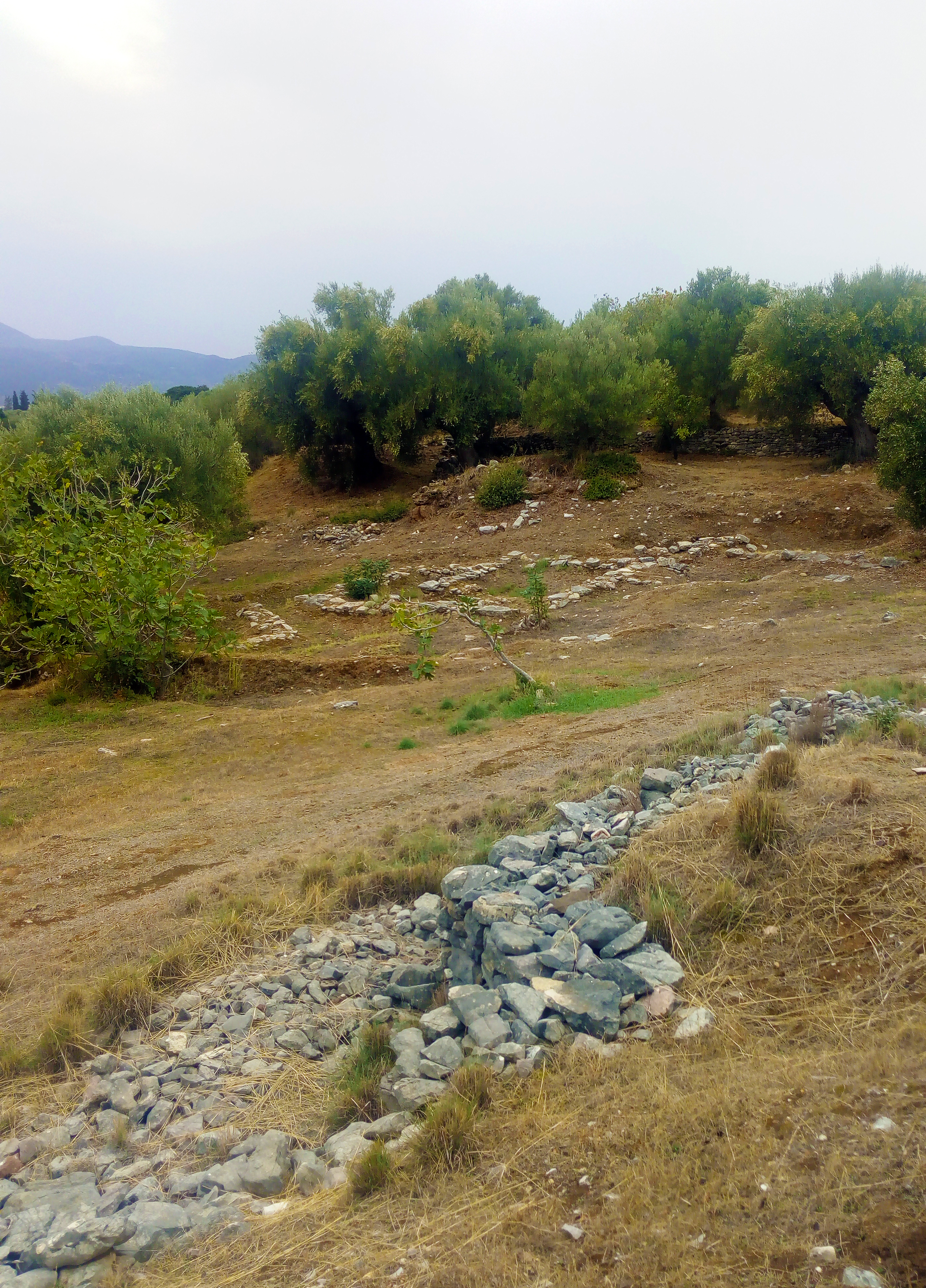
The archaeological site of Nichoria

Around the acropolis of Nichoria extends a necropolis with various kinds of tombs dating from the 15th to the 8th century B.C. Although the excavations were not carried out in the entire region of Nichoria, trenches opened in the region of Karpophora revealed remains of the settlement, such as the main street and parts of buildings which were used clearly for habitation. The most important among them was probably the apsidal megaron of the Sub-mycenaean period, one of the largest dated in the so-called “Greek Dark Ages” in the entire Greece: it was 13.6 m. long and 8 m. wide, and it was accompanied by a circular construction with paved floor. It has been suggested that it might have had a ritual-religious character. Two more megaron-type constructions were discovered, dated to the LHII and to the LHIIIA1 period respectively, i.e. in the peak time of Nichoria.
