= Hesperia (journal) =

Journal

- Discipline: Greek archaeology, art, epigraphy, history, and literature
- Language: English

Publication details
- History: 1932–present
- Publisher: American School of Classical Studies at Athens (United States)
- Frequency: quarterly

Standard abbreviations
- ISO 4: Hesperia

Indexing
- ISSN: 0018-098X (print); 1553-5622 (web)
- LCCN: 2001-227375
- OCLC no.: 48531965

Links
- Journal homepage

Hesperia is a peer-reviewed journal published quarterly by the American School of Classical Studies at Athens. It was founded in 1932 for the publication of the work of the school, which was previously published in the American Journal of Archaeology. This is still the main aim of the journal today. It also accepts other submissions by scholars in the fields of Greek archaeology, art, epigraphy, history, and literature.
