= Archaeological Institute of America =

American archaeological organization

- Nickname: AIA
- Formation: 1879
- Headquarters: Boston, MA
- Subsidiaries: American Journal of Archaeology; Archaeology
- Website: www.archaeological.org

The Archaeological Institute of America (AIA) is North America's oldest learned society and largest organization devoted to the world of archaeology. AIA professionals have carried out archaeological fieldwork around the world and AIA has established research centers and schools in seven countries. As of 2019, the society had more than 6,100 members and more than 100 affiliated local societies in the United States and overseas. AIA members include professional archaeologists and members of the public.

The AIA has established many archaeological organizations and protected many historical sites in the world. The AIA has hosted an annual meeting every year for over 120 years, where archaeologists present their latest work. The institute also has established scholarships for students and awarded archaeologists for their contributions to archaeology.

The institute publishes a scholarly journal, the American Journal of Archaeology (AJA) and the magazine Archaeology.

It is organized as a 501(c)(3) Public Charity; in 2024 it claimed total revenue of $6,452,285 and total assets of $18,603,495.

== History ==
The institute was founded in Boston in 1879 by Charles Eliot Norton with his colleagues and friends. They formed the society "for furthering and directing the archaeological and artistic investigation and research". Norton was the first president. The institute subsequently expanded its reach through the establishment of schools of archaeology around the Mediterranean and in the southwestern United States.

== Publications ==
The American Journal of Archaeology (AJA) is the AIA's peer-reviewed academic journal, and Archaeology is the popular magazine issued by the institute.

The American Journal of Archaeology was founded in 1885; the second series began in 1897. The AJA is published four times a year by the Archaeological Institute of America and the University of Chicago Press. The chief editors of the magazine are Emma Blake of the University of Arizona and Robert Schon of the University of Arizona. The journal presents original studies of the various peoples and material cultures of the Mediterranean and related regions, including North Africa (Egypt and Sudan), Western Asia (Caucasus), and Europe, from prehistory to late antiquity and beyond. The AJA encourages work that explores the cultures of the ancient Mediterranean along with other regions and periods and discusses the reasons for their continuing significance in the present. Also addressed in the journal are the history of the discipline, archaeological methodologies, and theoretical approaches.

The Archaeological Institute of America has continuously published Archaeology since 1948. The magazine engages and entertains readers through vivid stories, surprising narratives, and inspiring images, bringing people of the past into our lives in the present. The magazine and website of the American Institute of Archaeology contain news of recent archaeological discoveries. The magazine is available at newsstands or on the website.

== Governance ==
The institute is governed by the council. All representatives must be AIA members who know AIA rules, work throughout the year and vote on issues, and attend meetings. The Governing Board prepares and approves the organization's annual budget and oversees its investments and donations, also conducting fundraising activities. The board meets three times a year and consists of seven officers elected by the council and twenty-four to thirty governors. There are three types of trustees, representing different constituents of AIA: General Trustees, Academic Trustees, and Society Trustees. The executive committee of the governing board holds at least three meetings annually.

Elizabeth S. Greene is the current president (term 2023 to 2026), and Brian I. Daniels is the first vice president (term 2023 to 2026).

== Scholarships and honors ==
The AIA offers scholarships for young academic members and funds several students for excavation, research, publication, and site preservation. Its numerous awards recognize archaeologists and individuals and communities who have made outstanding contributions to the field and heritage conservation. The Pomerance Award is given annually to recognize scientists' contributions to the field.

== Presidents ==
The presidents of the institute were:

- Charles Eliot Norton 1879–1889: Charles Eliot Norton (November 16, 1827 – October 21, 1908) was an American author, social critic, and professor of art based in New England. He was a progressive social reformer and a liberal activist whom many of his contemporaries considered the most cultivated man in the United States.
- Seth Low 1890–1896
- John Williams White 1897–1902
- Thomas Day Seymour 1903–1907
- Francis Willey Kelsey 1908–1912
- Harry Langford Wilson 1913 (died February 1913)
- F.W. Shipley 1913–1917
- James Childester Egbert 1918–1921
- Ralph Van Deman Magoffin 1922–1930
- Louis Eleazar Lord 1931–1936
- William Bell Dinsmoor 1937–1945
- Sterling Dow 1946–1948
- Hugh Hencken 1949–1951
- Kenneth J. Conant 1952
- Henry T. Rowell 1953–1956
- George E. Mylonas 1957–1960
- Jotham Johnson 1961–1964
- Margaret Thompson 1965–1968
- Rodney S. Young 1969–1972
- James B. Pritchard 1973–1974
- Frederick R. Matson 1975–1976
- Robert H. Dyson, Jr. 1977–1980
- Machteld J. Mellink 1981–1984
- James R. Wiseman 1985–1988
- Martha Sharp Joukowsky 1989–1992
- James Russell 1993–1994
- Stephen L. Dyson 1995–1998
- Nancy C. Wilkie 1999–2002
- Jane Waldbaum 2003–2006
- C. Brian Rose 2007–2010
- Elizabeth Bartman 2011–2013
- Andrew M. T. Moore 2014–2016
- Jodi Magness 2017–2019: Jodi Magness (born September 19, 1956) is an archaeologist, orientalist, and scholar of religion. She serves as the Kenan Distinguished Professor for Teaching Excellence in Early Judaism at the University of North Carolina at Chapel Hill. She previously taught at Tufts University.
- Laetitia La Follette 2020–2022: Laetitia La Follette was elected to a three-year term as chairman of the Archaeological Institute of America. She got her Ph.D. from Harvard, studying classics. She earned a master's degree in art and archaeology and a doctorate from Princeton University and is an associate professor and head of the Department of Art and Architectural History at the University of Massachusetts, Amherst. She studies the material culture of the ancient Mediterranean and the preservation of its cultural heritage. She has edited The Culture of Negotiation: Legacy, Ownership, and Intellectual Property.
- Elizabeth S. Greene 2023–2026

== Site preservation program and grants ==
As tourism and archaeology become more closely linked, archaeologists and site managers must consider the behavior and needs of visitors when deciding how to preserve and present sites. This requires consideration of issues such as how tourism will affect archaeological sites and impact research. In 2009, The Archaeological Institute of America partnered with the Adventure Travel Trade Association (ATTA) to develop a set of guidelines for people interested in organizing trips to archaeological sites.

== International Archaeology Day ==
International Archaeology Day has been celebrated annually on the third Saturday of October by the AIA and is held throughout the month. This archaeological activity is suitable for all ages and interests. The event features archaeologist's lectures, tours of archaeological sites, and archaeological fairs. IAD Scavenger Hunt is an online Scavenger Hunt game published by AIA, and the ArchaeoDoodles Contest is a doodle event held by AIA in which participants create illustrations and graphics using 15 words or phrases recommended by AIA to help update AIA's list of terms and definitions.

== Felicia A. Holton Book Award ==
The Felicia A. Holton Book Award, also known as the Holton Award, has been awarded annually to "a writer who, through a major work of non-fiction, represents the importance and excitement of archaeology to the general public". It is named after journalist and writer Felicia A. Holton, who co-wrote Koster: Americans in Search of Their Prehistoric Past with archaeologist Stuart Struever in 1979.

In 2020 it was won by Australian historian and writer Billy Griffiths, for his 2018 work Deep Time Dreaming: Uncovering Ancient Australia, and in 2014 by British archaeologist Joyce Tyldesley for Tutankhamen's Curse (Tutankhamen in the US).
