= American Journal of Archaeology =

Quarterly peer-reviewed academic journal

- Discipline: Archaeology
- Language: English
- Edited by: Jane B. Carter

Publication details
- History: 1897–present
- Publisher: University of Chicago Press on behalf of the Archaeological Institute of America (United States)
- Frequency: quarterly

Standard abbreviations
- ISO 4: Am. J. Archaeol.

Indexing
- CODEN: AJARAE
- ISSN: 0002-9114 (print); 1939-828X (web)
- JSTOR: 00029114

Links
- Journal homepage

The American Journal of Archaeology (AJA) is a quarterly peer-reviewed academic journal and the official publication of the Archaeological Institute of America, founded in 1897 (continuing the American Journal of Archaeology and of the History of the Fine Arts founded by the institute in 1885). The journal primarily features articles about the art and archaeology of Europe and the Mediterranean world, including the Ancient Near East and Ancient Egypt, from Prehistoric to Late Antique times. It also publishes book reviews, museum exhibition reviews, and necrologies. It is published in January, April, July, and October each year in print and electronic editions.

The publication was co-founded in 1885 by Princeton University professors Arthur Frothingham and Allan Marquand. Frothingham became its first editor-in-chief, serving until 1896. From 1940 to 1950, the journal published articles by Michael Ventris, Alice Kober, and Emmett Bennett, which contributed to the decipherment of the ancient Linear B script.

The journal is published by University of Chicago Press on behalf of the Archaeological Institute of America, and its current editor-in-chief is Jane B. Carter. The journal's first woman editor-in-chief was Mary Hamilton Swindler.
