= Treasury of Atreus =

Tholos tomb at Mycenae, Greece, dated to ca.1250 BCE

- Τάφος του Αγαμέμνονα (Greek)
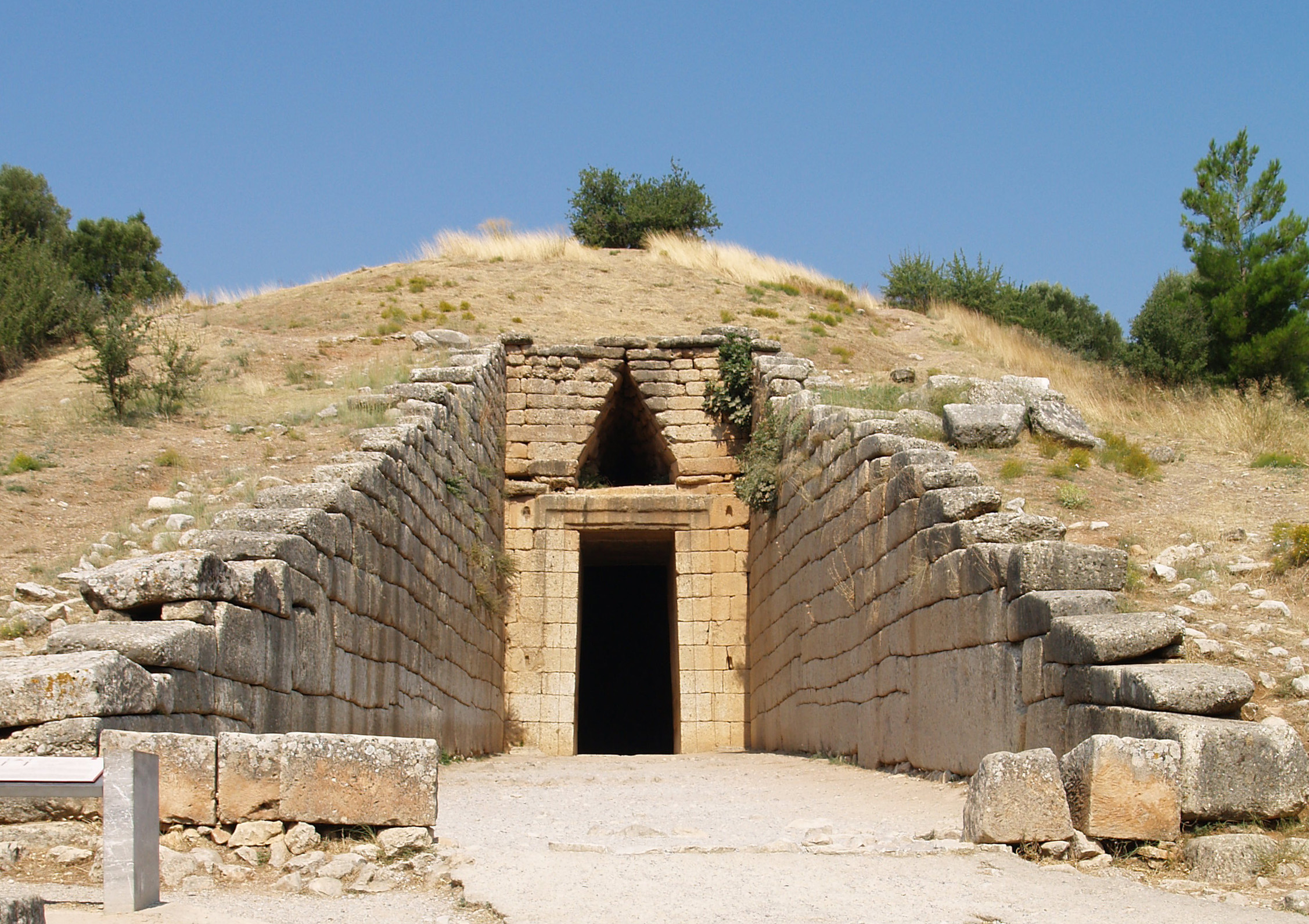
- The dromos of the Treasury of Atreus

- Location of the Treasury of Atreus in the Peloponnese
- 37.72682°N 22.75387°E
- Periods: Late Bronze Age
- Cultures: Mycenaean Greece
- Location: Mycenae, Greece

History
- Built: c. 1400 – c. 1250 BCE

Site notes
- Material: Poros stone, conglomerate, marble.
- Excavation dates: 1801–1955
- Archaeologists: Heinrich Schliemann, Panagiotis Stamatakis, Alan Wace
- Public access: Yes

UNESCO World Heritage Site
- Designated: 1999
- Part of: Archaeological Sites of Mycenae and Tiryns
- Reference no.: 941

The Treasury of Atreus or Tomb of Agamemnon is a large tholos or beehive tomb constructed between 1300 and 1250 BCE in Mycenae, Greece.

It is the largest and most elaborate tholos tomb known to have been constructed in the Aegean Bronze Age, and one of the last to have been built in the Argolid. The main tomb consisted of a circular burial chamber, or thalamos, topped with a corbelled dome. This dome was the largest in the world until the Roman period, and remains the world's largest corbelled dome. Originally, the façade was decorated with marble columns and sculptures, which used marble from the Mani Peninsula in the southern Peloponnese. Its artwork has been suggested to have been inspired by that of Minoan Crete and of Ancient Egypt.

Little is known of the persons who might have been buried in the tomb: the identification with the mythical Atreus and Agamemnon likely dates to the 18th century. The immense labour involved in the construction of the tomb, as well as the similarities between the architecture of the tholos and the structures of the citadel of Mycenae, has led to suggestions that it may have been intended for a ruler of Mycenae, and represent Mycenae's increasingly dominant status in the later part of the Bronze Age.

The tomb was first excavated in the 19th century, when parts of the marble sculptures of its façade were removed by the British aristocrat Lord Elgin and the Ottoman governor Veli Pasha. It was partly excavated by Heinrich Schliemann, and more fully by Panagiotis Stamatakis, in the 1870s. Throughout the 20th century, the British School at Athens made a series of excavations in and around the tomb, led by Alan Wace, which primarily aimed to settle the difficult question of the date of its construction.

== Name ==
=== Mythology ===
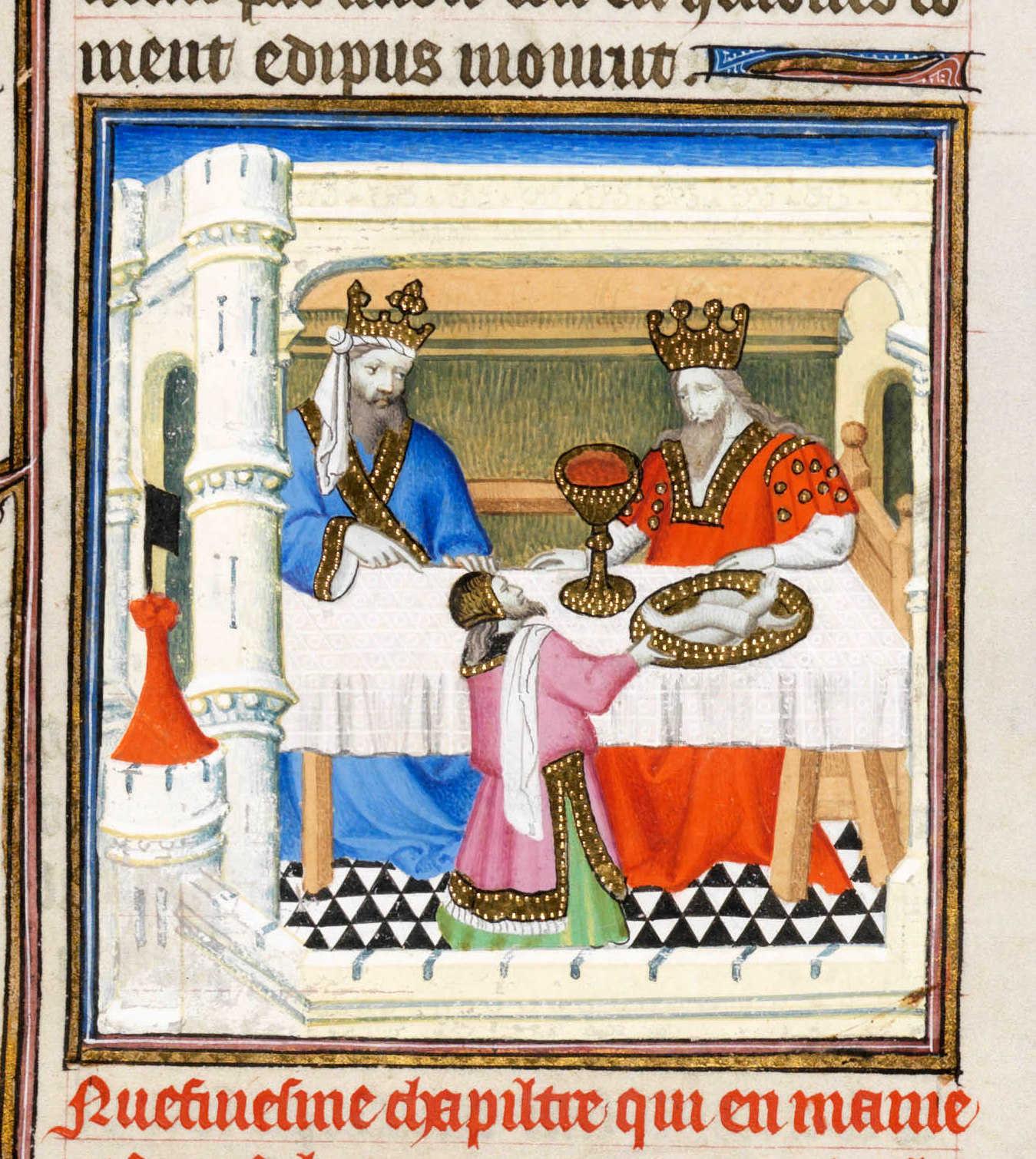
Atreus (left) serves Thyestes his sons' flesh, portrayed on a medieval manuscript c. 1410.

In Greek mythology, Atreus was the son of Hippodamia and Pelops, the king of Pisa in the western Peloponnese. In the version of the myth recounted by Hyginus, Atreus and his brother Thyestes killed their half-brother Chrysippus by casting him into a well out of jealousy, urged on by their mother. As a punishment for their crime, they were banished to Mycenae, where Hippodamia is variously said to have died by suicide or further exiled herself to Midea.

Atreus and Thyestes quarrelled for the throne of Mycenae: first, Thyestes gained it after Atreus' wife, Aerope, gave a golden lamb from Atreus' flock to Thyestes and then tricked him into agreeing that whoever held the lamb should become king. Atreus in turn managed to regain the throne after Hermes persuaded Thyestes to hand the kingship to Atreus if the sun were to rise in the west and set in the east, and then Helios altered the usual course of the sun so that it did exactly that. Finally, Atreus banished Thyestes after tricking him into eating the flesh of his own sons.

On the advice of an oracle, Thyestes had a son by his daughter, Pelopia, as it was foretold that this son would kill Atreus. When the infant, Aegisthus, was born, his mother abandoned him, but he was found by a shepherd and given to Atreus to raise; when Aegisthus entered adulthood, Thyestes revealed the truth of his parentage. Aegisthus killed Atreus and ruled Mycenae jointly with Thyestes.

The heroes Agamemnon and Menelaus were the twin sons of Atreus, sometimes known as the Atreides in Greek literature. After their father's murder, they took refuge with Tyndareus, king of Sparta: later, with Menelaus' assistance, Agamemnon overthrew Aegisthus and Thyestes and became king of Mycenae. However, Aegisthus would, along with Agamemnon's wife Clytemnestra, kill Agamemnon on his return from the Trojan War, before being himself killed by Agamemnon's son, Orestes.

=== Modern name ===
The precise origin of the name is uncertain, but it probably dates to the 18th century. The tomb was visible in Antiquity, but not associated with Atreus or Agamemnon when Pausanias visited in the 2nd century CE, since he describes the graves of both rulers as being within the walls of Mycenae. After Pausanias, there are no documented accounts of travellers visiting Mycenae until 1700, when the Venetian engineer and surveyor Francesco Vandeyk identified both the Lion Gate and the tomb now known as the 'Treasury of Atreus', which he conjectured was the tomb of a king. Claude-Louis Fourmont, who visited Mycenae in 1729–1730, used the name 'Tomb of Atreus' for the monument: by the time Edward Daniel Clarke visited at the beginning of the 19th century, he could report a tradition that the tomb was known as 'Treasury of Atreus' and identified with the tomb of Agamemnon mentioned in Pausanias.

The nearby tombs known as the Tomb of Clytemnestra and Tomb of Aegisthus are so named by association with the Treasury of Atreus.

== Construction ==
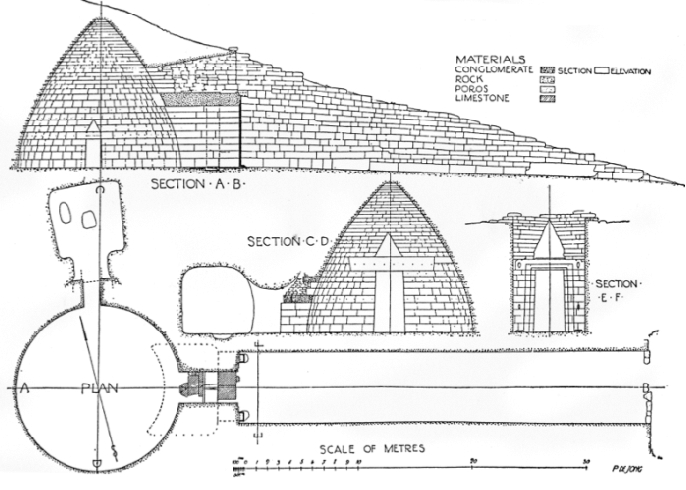
Piet de Jong's architectural plan of the Treasury of Atreus, drawn for Alan Wace's excavations of 1921–1923.

The Treasury of Atreus is the largest and most elaborate of the known Mycenaean tholos tombs. It follows the typical tripartite division of these tombs into a narrow rectangular passageway (dromos), joined by a deep doorway (stomion) to a burial chamber (thalamos) surmounted by a corbelled dome. The dome was covered with earth to heighten it; some of this mound remains, but erosion has reduced its height and moved its apex towards the west.

The dromos of the tomb is oriented east-west and is 36 m long by 6 m wide. For the first 19 metres from the stomion, the sides are dressed with conglomerate stone walls: while the dromoi of earlier tombs had been lined with rubble or poros ashlar, the Treasury of Atreus is the first tomb at Mycenae to be fully lined with conglomerate. The source of this conglomerate is likely to have been local to Mycenae. Wace estimates the total volume of masonry in the dromos at over 600 m^{3}, or a weight of over 1200 tons. The height of the walls increases from 0.5 m at the eastern end to 10 m at the façade; their thickness correspondingly increases from around 2 m at the eastern entrance to around 3 m at the western entrance nearest to the façade, reflecting the additional pressure of the earth behind the walls as well as from the façade they support. The ashlar walls are bonded by yellow 'Plesia' clay, a mortar commonly used in Mycenaean architecture.

The major periods of the Helladic Chronology used in this article.
Period	Approximate Date
Middle Helladic III	c.1700–c.1600 BCE
Late Helladic I	c.1600–c.1450 BCE
Late Helladic II	c.1450–c.1400 BCE
Late Helladic IIIA	c.1400–c.1300 BCE
Late Helladic IIIB	c.1300–c.1180 BCE
Late Helladic IIIC	c.1180–c.1050 BCE

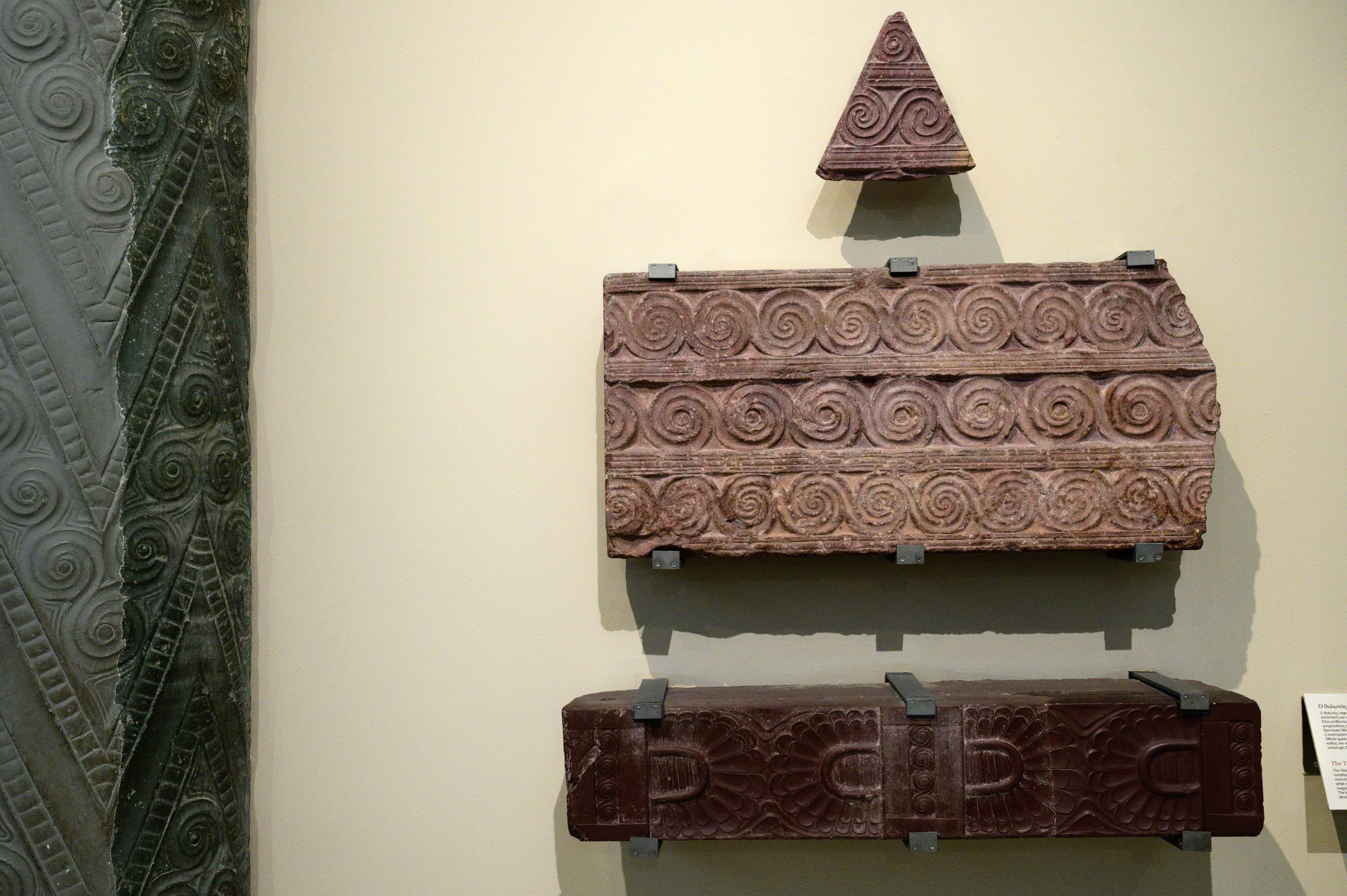
Pieces of red marble (rosso antico or lapis Taenarius) from the façade of the Treasury of Atreus, in the National Archaeological Museum, Athens.

The façade of the stomion is 10.5 m high, with a doorway 5.4 m high, 2.7 m wide and 5.4 m deep. On top of this doorway are two lintel blocks, the innermost of which is 8 m in length, 5 m in width and 1.2 m thick: with a weight of around 120 tons, it is the heaviest single piece of masonry known from Greek architecture and may have required up to 1,000 people to transport it to the tomb. Above the doorway is a 'relieving triangle', an innovation first used at Mycenae on the earlier Tomb of Aegisthus to reduce the stress placed upon the lintel. This triangle is believed to have originally been decorated with sculpture. It has been suggested that the scale of the relieving triangle was intended to symbolise the power to harness resources.

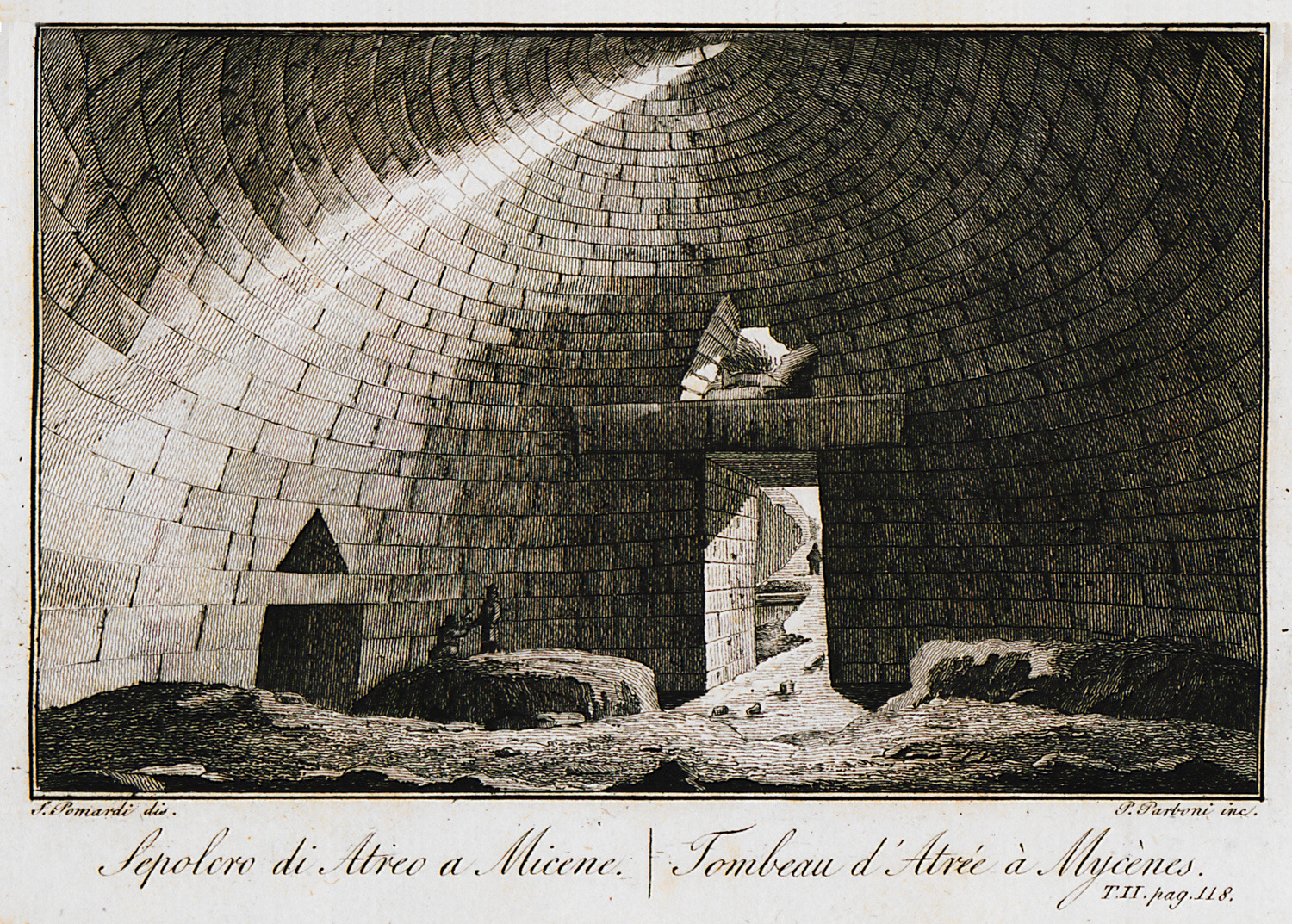
Drawing of the interior of the thalamos, published by Simone Pomardi in 1820 after visiting the tomb in 1801–1806, prior to modern excavation.

Due to the fragmentary and scattered nature of the remains, (Note: See § Excavation below.) there are various reconstructions of the decoration of the façade. The door was flanked by semi-engaged columns in green marble, with zig-zag motifs on the shaft. Two smaller half-columns were placed on either side of the relieving triangle, while red marble was used to create a frieze with rosettes above the architrave of the door, and spiral decoration in bands of red marble that closed the triangular aperture. In the 1960s, Richard Hope Simpson, along with Reynold Higgins and S. E. Ellis, demonstrated that the red marble, known as rosso antico, came from quarries on the Mani peninsula, and suggested that it was 'highly probable' that the green marble traced to the same source. (Note: Elizabeth French has argued that both stones are 'probably from the Argolid', but without presenting evidence for this claim.) This red marble was later known as lapis Taenarius after Cape Taenarum. Two reliefs in gypsum (the only such use of the material in the tomb), carved with the image of bulls, may have decorated either the façade or the side chamber. The empty 'relieving triangle' above the lintel of the façade served to direct the weight of the dome away from the centre of the lintel, reducing the stress placed upon it. Christos Tsountas suggested that the façade may have included an alabaster cornice, since fragments of a similar structure were found in the Tomb of Clytemnestra, which he believed to be contemporary with 'Atreus': however, recent re-evaluation of the Tomb of Clytemnestra has suggested that it may have been built up to two centuries later, making this suggestion hypothetical at best.

The thalamos is made up of 33 courses of ashlar masonry (cut and worked limestone), 14.5 m in diameter and 13.2 m high. It was initially constructed by the excavation of a cylindrical cavity from the hillside, which was then built up with masonry into a corbelled dome. Traces of nails hammered into the interior have been recovered, which have been interpreted as evidence for decorations, perhaps golden rosettes, once hung from the inside dome. A 2.5-meter-high doorway on the northern side of the inner chamber leads into a 6-meter square side chamber: along with the Treasury of Minyas at Orchomenos in Boeotia, which appears to be built to the same plan, the Treasury of Atreus is the only known Mycenaean tholos with a side chamber. Most scholars consider this to have been the location of any burials that were made inside the tomb, though no direct evidence of such burials has survived; Alan Wace, however, believed that it was used as an ossuary to which the remains of previous burials were relocated while further interments were made in the main thalamos. The tomb was the tallest and widest stone dome in the world for over a thousand years, until the Roman period, which saw the construction of the “Temple of Mercury” (actually part of a bath complex) at Baiae in the late 1st century BCE or early 1st century CE and of the Pantheon in Rome in the 2nd century CE. Both of these are "true" domes, as opposed to corbelled domes, making the Treasury of Atreus the world's largest corbelled dome.

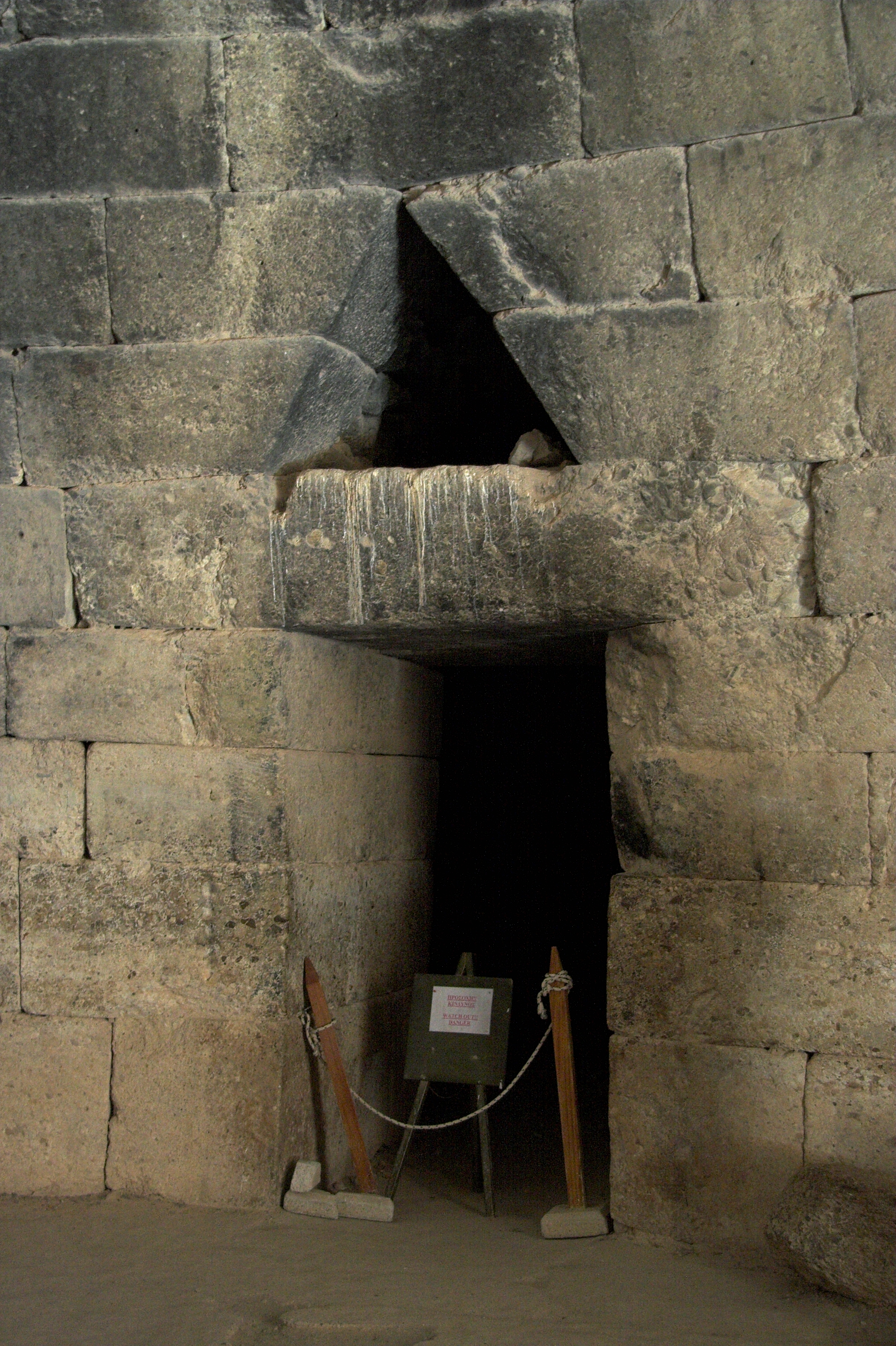
Entrance to the side chamber within the thalamos.

The earthen tumulus above the tomb was originally supported by a retaining wall of poros stone, which is preserved to a height of 1.5 m and a thickness of around 1 m. It is believed that this poros stone was quarried in the hills north-west of Mycenae, in the direction of Nemea. A terrace, approximately 27 m in both length and breadth, was constructed in front of the tomb.

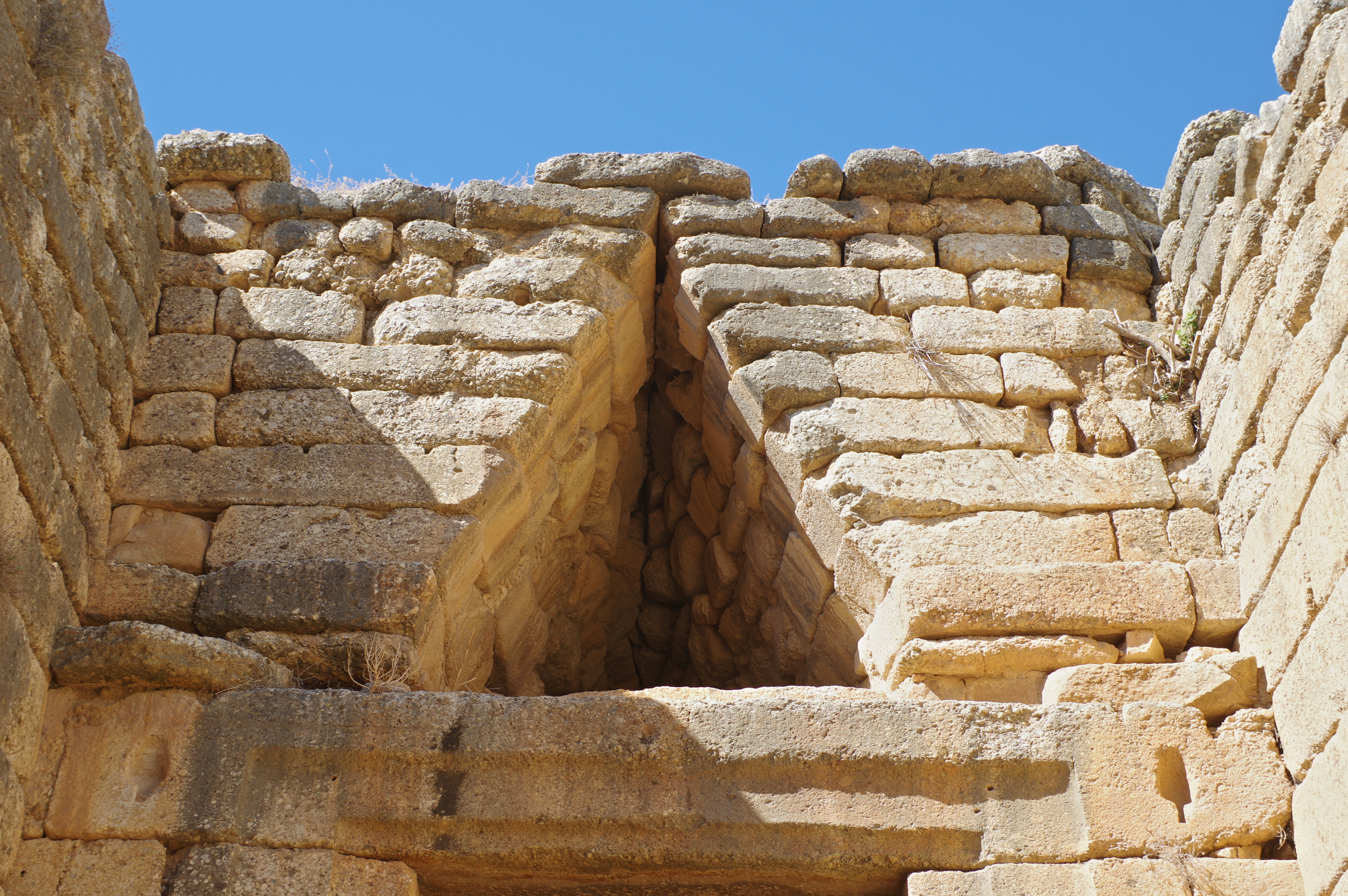
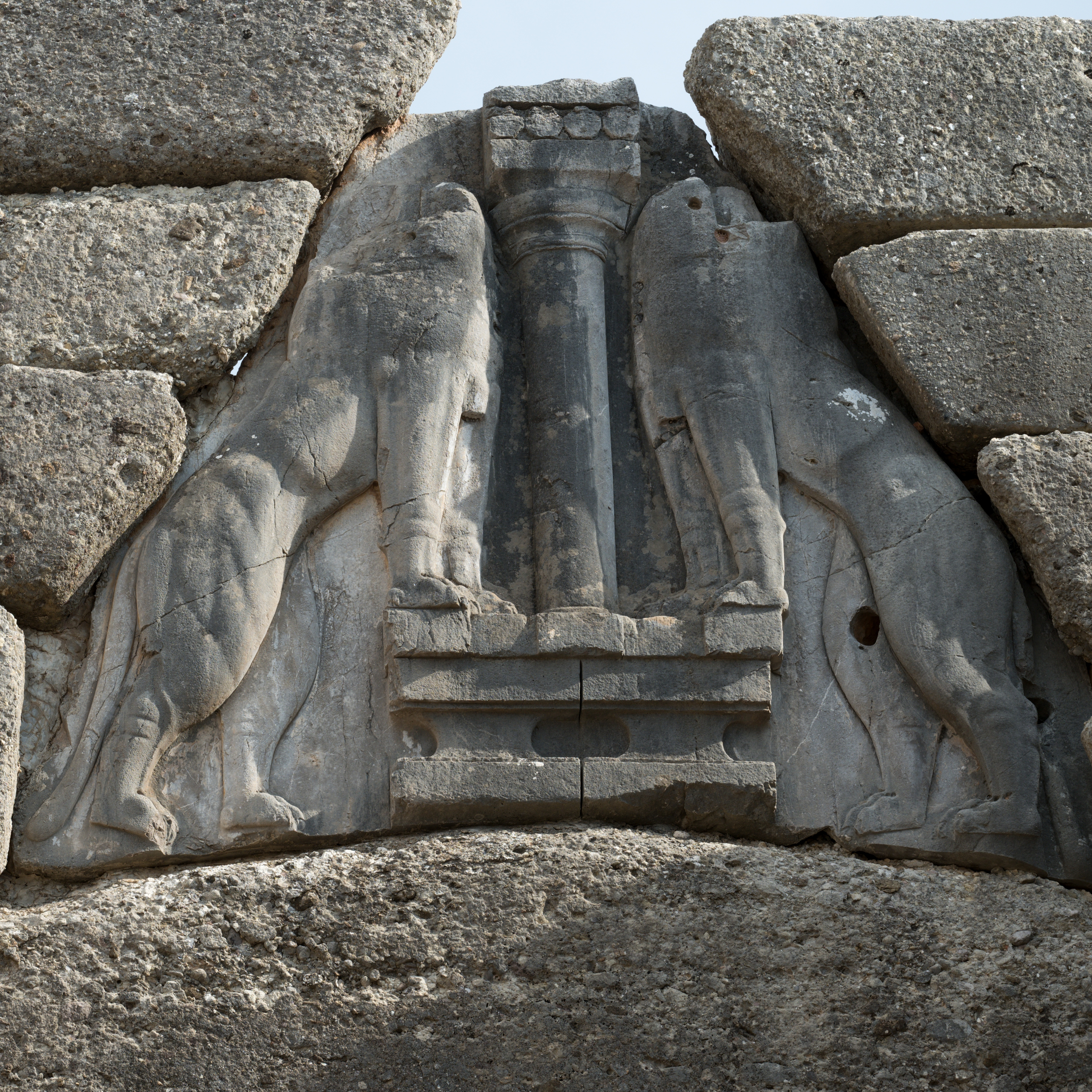
Comparison of the relieving triangle of the Treasury of Atreus (left) and the relief of the Lion Gate (right)

James Wright has described the construction of tholos tombs as a 'monumental expression of power', and highlighted the connections between the architecture of the tomb and that of the broadly-contemporary (Note: See Date below.) fortifications and palace on the acropolis. In particular, Wright draws attention to the resemblance between the relieving triangle and the sculpted relief of the Lion Gate, and the heavy use of conglomerate on the tomb, which is used within the citadel to accentuate key architectural features, particularly column and anta bases, thresholds and door jambs. It has also been suggested that the tapering sides and inward slant of the doorway may have been inspired by Ancient Egyptian architecture, while the running-spiral motif on the upper half-columns may trace back to Minoan art.

Little is known about the organisation of the tomb's construction or the workers who built it. Elizabeth French has suggested that the same workforce who constructed the LH III megaron (the so-called 'Palace III') on the acropolis may subsequently have been used to construct the Treasury of Atreus, and that they may have been worked as part of a corvée system. It has been calculated that the construction of the tomb required at least 20,000 worker-days of labour, (Note: Fitzsimons gives a higher estimate of 32789 worker-days.) and estimated that it may have occupied up to 1600 people and been a years- or decades-long project.

Nothing is known of who might have been buried inside the tomb, though it is generally considered to have been an elite or royal figure, perhaps a ruler of the site or somebody close to its rulers.

== Date ==
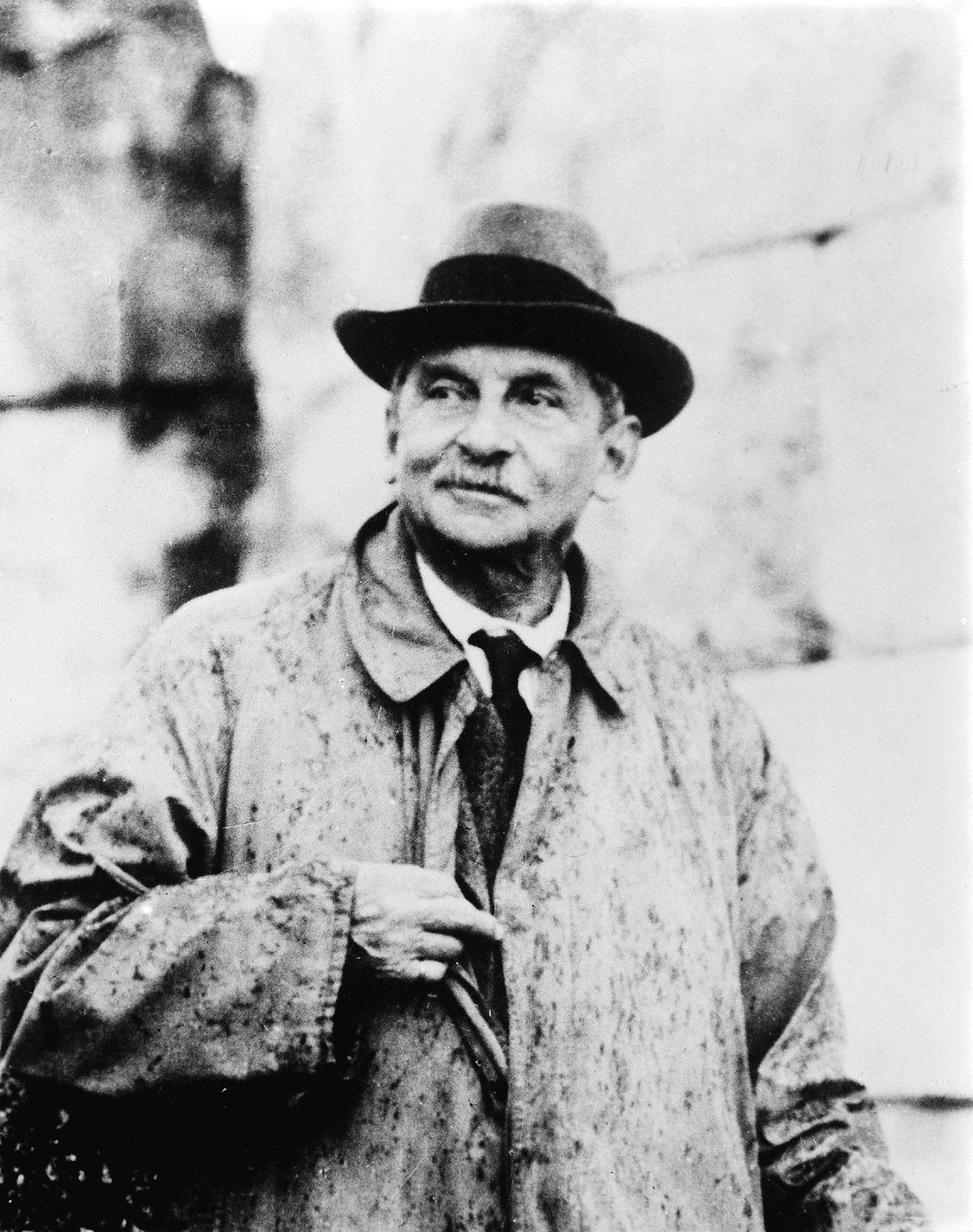
Arthur Evans, c. 1920s. Evans argued – ultimately unsuccessfully – for an early date of the Treasury of Atreus between c. 1600–1500 BCE, to allow for its coincidence with the zenith of the Neopalatial Period of Minoan civilization.

The date of the tomb has historically been controversial, though most scholars would now date it to c. 1400–1250 BCE. In the early 20th century, it was the focus of a debate between Arthur Evans and Alan Wace, which became known as the 'Helladic Heresy'. After the beginnings of his excavations of Knossos from 1900, Evans began increasingly to argue for a distinction between the 'Minoan' civilisation of Crete and the 'Mycenaean' civilisation of the mainland. Although he had used the terms 'Minoan' and 'Mycenaean' interchangeably for his findings on Crete during the first two years of excavation, Evans came to follow the German archaeologist Arthur Milchhöfer in arguing that the origins of Mycenaean civilisation lay on Crete: specifically, through the 'domination' of the mainland of Greece by 'Minoan dynasts'. In 1918, however, Wace published an article entitled 'The Pre-Mycenaean Pottery of the Mainland' along with Carl Blegen, whose own excavations at Korakou in Corinthia in 1915–1916 had convinced him that substantial differences existed between 'Minoan' and 'Helladic' culture in the Late Bronze Age. In their article, Wace and Blegen argued for the essential continuity of mainland-Greek, or 'Helladic', culture from the early to late Bronze Age, and that 'Mycenaean' civilisation (which then referred specifically to the period now designated as the Late Helladic). Mycenaean culture, they argued, was 'not merely transplanted from Crete, but [was] the fruit of the cultivated Cretan graft set on the wild stock of the mainland'. Moreover, while they accepted the influence of Crete on mainland Greece during the Middle Helladic period, they argued that the culture of the mainland remained 'Mycenaean as opposed to Cretan', and that it was 'inconceivable' that Late Helladic culture represented a different 'race' to that of the Early Helladic.

Wace and Blegen's argument stood in direct opposition to Evans' narrative, by which the Shaft Graves of Mycenae, first used in the transition between the Middle Helladic and Late Helladic periods, represented the tombs of the 'Minoan' rulers of Mycenae, and therefore a sharp break with the cultural forms that preceded them. He further argued that the tholoi, particularly the Treasury of Atreus, were not only contemporary with the Shaft Graves but themselves copies of similar-looking structures found on Crete. In the report of his first excavations at Mycenae in 1920, of which he informed Evans by letter, Wace suggested a later date for the Treasury of Atreus of c.1400–1200 BCE, rather than the c.1600–1500 BCE needed to conform with Evans' theory. This chronological disagreement, and the associated implication that the monumentality and elaboration of Mycenae's funerary forms had increased over the Late Helladic period — which was seen to contradict the idea of the site having been dominated by Cretan rulers — was dubbed the 'Helladic Heresy' by John Percival Droop.

Following further excavations in the 1920s, including that of the Tomb of Aegisthus, which he dated securely to LH IIA and argued as earlier than 'Atreus', Wace dated the tomb to LH III, later giving a terminus ante quem of 1350 BCE. This was primarily based on the findings of his 1939 excavation, which showed that the dromos had been dug through the so-called 'Bothros deposit', which included LH IIIA1 material, providing a terminus post quem for its construction. Most modern treatments consider the construction of the Treasury of Atreus and the fortification of the citadel of Mycenae, including the construction of the Lion Gate, to be broadly contemporary and to belong to the LH III period. However, there is some disagreement about the relative chronology: George Mylonas argued that the fortifications began in LH IIIA2 and that the Treasury of Atreus was constructed in LH IIIB1, contemporary with the final phase of fortification, while William Cavanagh and Christopher Mee, along with Elizabeth French, considered that 'Atreus' belongs to the early part of LH IIIA1.

By LH III, Mycenae and nearby Tiryns were the only sites in the Argolid where tholos tombs were constructed: previously, such tombs had been constructed at Dendra, Kazarma, Berbati, Prosymna and Kokla. Scholars generally consider that the Treasury of Atreus was the penultimate tholos constructed at Mycenae, ahead of the Tomb of Clytemnestra. (Note: Olivier Pelon argued that the Tomb of Atreus was the latest of the tholoi, though this chronology predates the reassessment of the Tomb of Clytemnestra to LH IIIB1.)

A single sherd beneath the threshold of the tomb dates to LH IIIB middle: this is considered to have come to be there during a later refurbishment of the tomb.

== Location ==
The tholoi, chamber tombs and grave circles around Mycenae. The Treasury of Atreus is numbered as 4.

The site of Mycenae is situated in Argolis, in the north-eastern Peloponnese, on the eastern edge of the Argive Plain. The Treasury of Atreus is located to the west side of the modern road leading to the citadel, approximately 500 m south-southwest of the Lion Gate.

The earliest of Mycenae's tholoi were constructed around the Kalkani necropolis, which had previously been used for the earliest chamber tombs. The Lion and Aegisthus tholoi, by contrast, were built much closer to the acropolis, a trend followed by the later Tomb of Clytemnestra. This creates a division of most of Mycenae's nine tholos tombs into two groups, separated by the Panagia ridge. The greater size and elaboration of the tombs nearer the citadel has led to the suggestion that they are 'more royal' than those on the other side of the Panagia ridge, though the chronological concentration of most of the tholoi in LH IIA, the fact that the smaller Cyclopean and Epano Phournos tholoi predate the grander Lion and Aegisthus tombs, and the fact that ostentatious burials continued in monumental chamber tombs all problematise a straightforward connection between tholos tombs and royalty at Mycenae, at least before LH IIB.

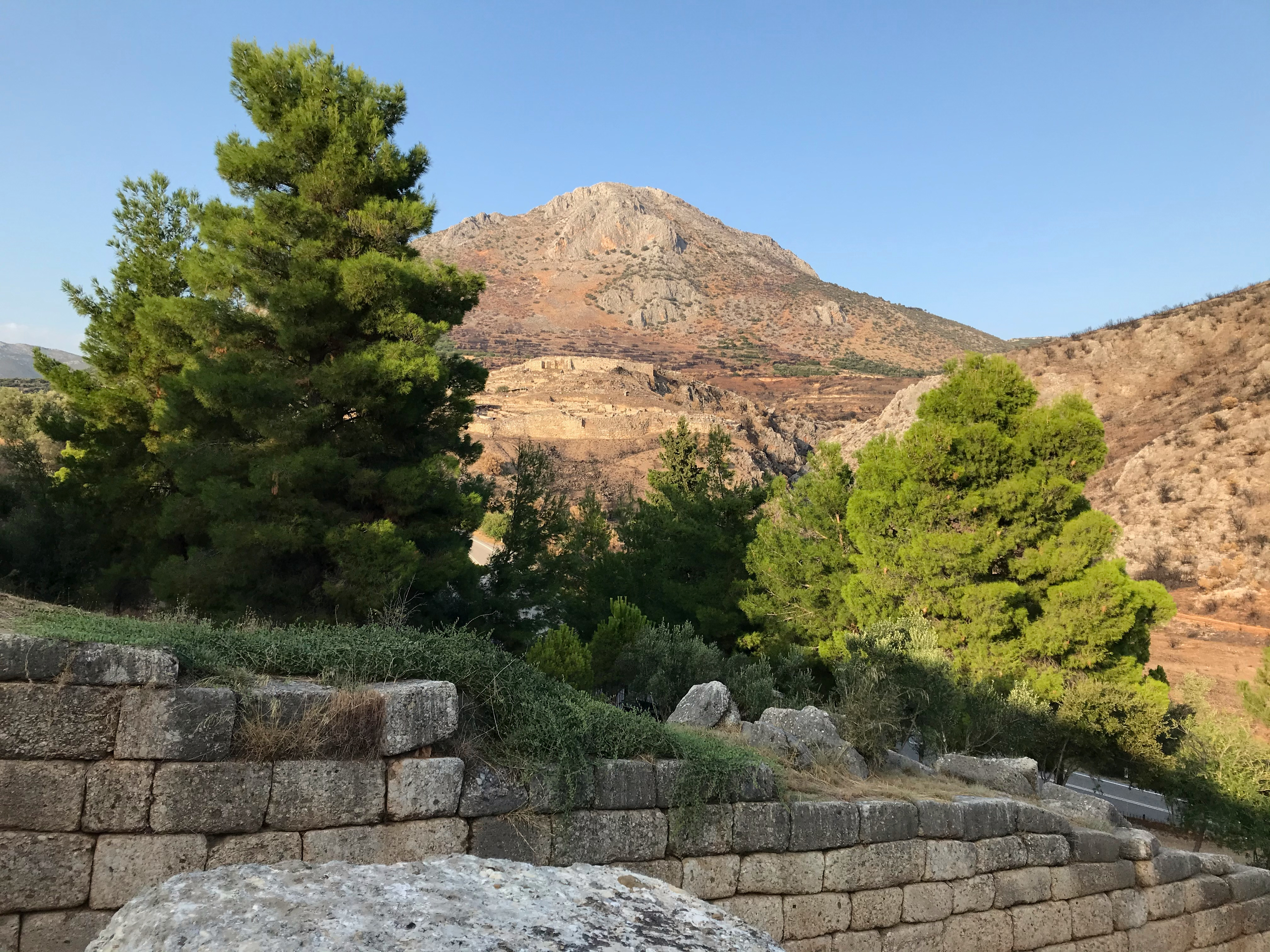
View of the acropolis of Mycenae from the Treasury of Atreus, with the peak of Profitis Ilias behind. David Mason has argued that the coincidence of the shape of the acropolis with Profitis Ilias was an important consideration behind the placement of the Treasury of Atreus.

The Treasury of Atreus is set alone at the southern edge of a bowl on the Panagia ridge's eastern slope. Prior to its construction, the site was occupied by a building, which was demolished to build the tholos. Michael Boyd has suggested that the tomb's position was intended to 'co-opt the traditions of the past without directly competing with the present', since most contemporary burials were made in chamber tombs further from the acropolis. David Mason has drawn attention to the tomb's position alongside a likely Mycenaean route to the acropolis, which perhaps gave it a protective function, and to the views created both of the citadel from the tomb and of the tomb from the citadel, which he argues would have emphasised the connection between the dead interred in the tomb and the living who held power over Mycenae. James Wright has also suggested that the location may have been selected for the greatest possible impact upon those arriving at Mycenae from the south.

The alignment of the dromos is believed to have reflected topographic considerations — it is aligned perpendicular to the slope of the hill, which would have best facilitated its construction.

== Post-Mycenaean history ==
The remains of a seventh-century BCE krater decorated with the image of a horse, found beside the retaining wall of the tumulus, has been taken as evidence of cult activity at the tomb. Unlike the earlier Tomb of Aegisthus and the later Tomb of Clytemnestra, there is little direct evidence of the tomb's use in the post-Mycenaean period, though a bronze pin found in the side chamber and a handful of other bronze objects from the tomb have been suggested as possibly belonging to the Geometric period. In other tombs of Mycenae, post-Mycenaean finds which are not associated with burials have been interpreted as signs of hero cult. Remains of this period in tholos tombs have been seen as a means for the short-lived Argive colony at Mycenae, established in the 3rd century BCE but abandoned within a century, to assert its connection with Mycenae's mythological heroes and so its status and prestige in relation to Argos.

=== Excavation ===
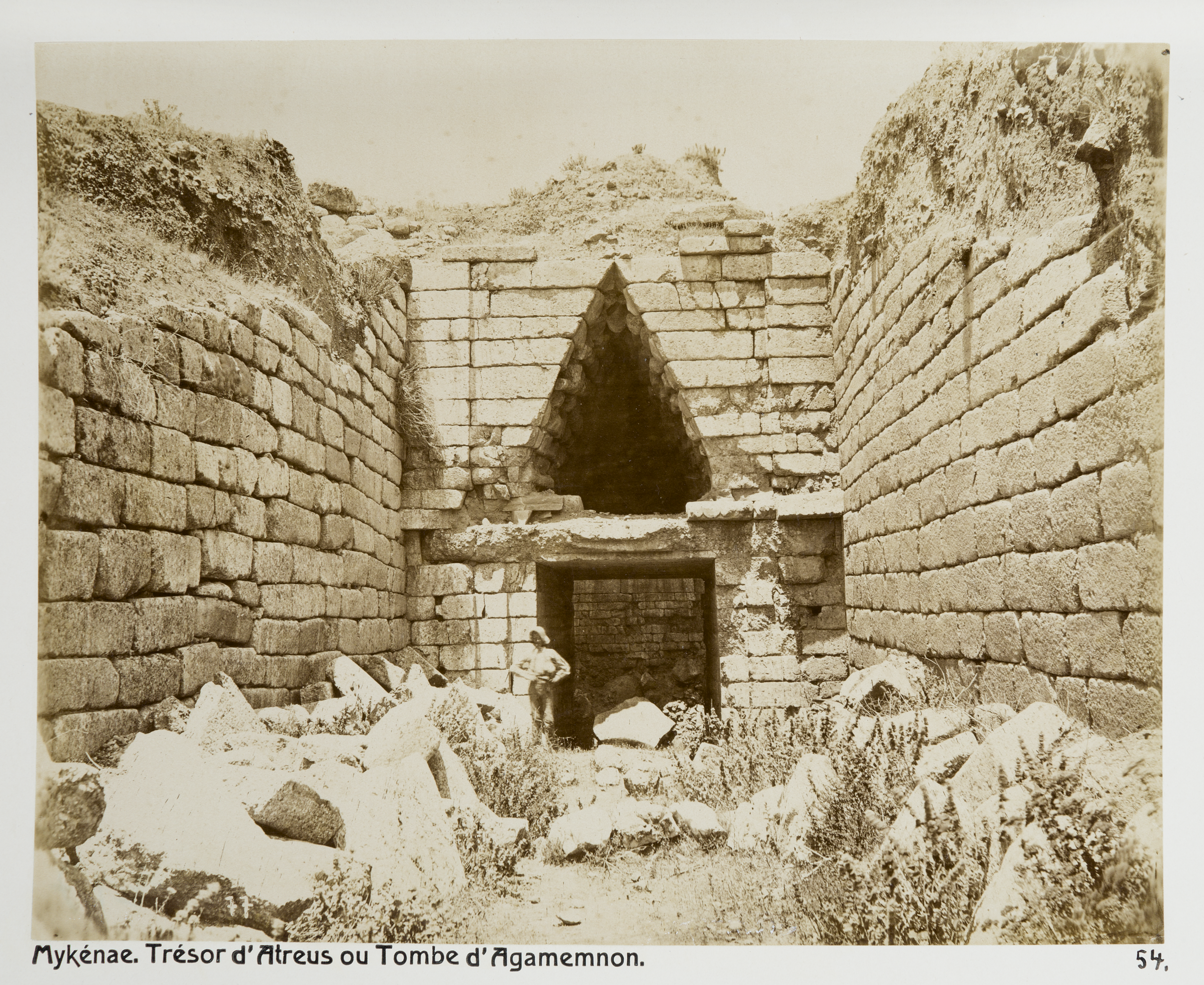
The dromos of the treasury, probably between Veli Pasha's excavations of 1810 and Stamatakis' clearance in 1876–1879.

In the 19th century, a local tradition believed that the tomb had been once explored by the agha of the nearby village of Karvati, who took from it a bronze lamp. The first securely-documented entrance to the tomb was undertaken by the British aristocrat Thomas Bruce, 7th Earl of Elgin. In 1801, Elgin had tasked his draughtsman, Giovanni Battista Lusieri, and Philip Hunt, a chaplain to the British embassy in Greece, to investigate various archaeological sites in Greece with a view to finding antiquities that might be taken back to Britain. Hunt visited Mycenae in August, and reported the Treasury of Atreus as 'a most stupendous conical subterranean building, quite entire, called by some antiquaries the Tomb of Agamemnon, by others the Royal Treasury of Mycenae'. (Note: Quoted in Pryce and Smith 1928, p. 15) Hunt also noted that the tomb was not intact, but open to the elements, and that 'floods of rain' and ingress of debris had made access difficult. (Note: Letter from Hunt to Elgin, 3 September 1801, quoted in Smith 1916, p.200)

Elgin visited on 8 May 1802, crawling, as his wife Mary attested in a letter to her mother, through the tomb's relieving triangle. He asked the voivode of Nafplio to clear the tomb, which was completed by Elgin's return to Mycenae on the 12th: the voivode presented him with fragments of pottery vases, ornamental stonework and a marble vase found within. Elgin also had parts of the columns flanking the doorway removed and shipped to England, along with the fragmentary gypsum reliefs of bulls, and architectural drawings made of the tomb by Sebastiano Ittar.

In June 1810, Veli Pasha, the Ottoman Pasha of the Morea, excavated the monument. (Note: Christos Tsountas, in 1897, wrote that Veli Pasha had 'rifled' the tomb in 1808: it is not known whether he is referring to the same incident.) He cleared most of the entrance to the tomb and entered the chamber with ladders; according to Heinrich Schliemann's later publication of his own excavations at Mycenae, he discovered 'bones covered with gold', as well as gemstones and other gold and silver objects. Veli Pasha sold some artefacts to the British MPs and antiquarians John Nicholas Fazakerley and Henry Gally Knight, and removed four large fragments of the semi-engaged columns beside the doorway. One of the fragments — last seen in 1815 — became part of a mosque in Argos; Veli Pasha gave the others as a gift to Howe Browne, 2nd Marquess of Sligo, who visited him shortly after the excavations and gave him two fourteen-pounder cannons in exchange. (Note: It is sometimes claimed that Sligo directed or co-directed the removals himself; this is likely to be erroneous, as Sligo arrived in Argolis only after the excavation and his letters make no mention of it.) Sligo described the columnar fragments as 'trifles', but had them shipped to his estate at Westport House in County Mayo, Ireland, where they were discovered in a basement by his grandson, George Browne, in 1904. George Browne offered them for 'public benefit' to the British Museum, to be combined with the fragments taken by Elgin and given in 1816 to the museum, in exchange for replicas of the reconstructed columns; they entered the museum in 1905.

Heinrich Schliemann may have explored the tomb during his brief, illegal excavations of Mycenae in 1874. (Note: Wace states that Schliemann 'made some tests' in the Treasury of Atreus, but gives the date as 1873 and as before his excavations of 1876. Schliemann's only visit to the site before those excavations, apart from a brief excursus to it in 1868, was between 23 February and 4 March 1874.) In 1876, he excavated in the side chamber, finding a small pit of unknown purpose; Alan Wace later suggested that it was the base for a column which was never put in. Between 1876 and 1879, Panagiotis Stamatakis cleared the debris from the dromos and entrance of the tomb, recovering fragments of sculpture believed to have come from the relieving triangle.

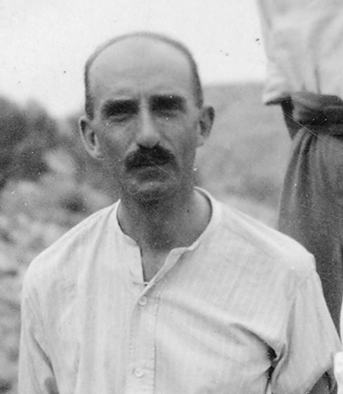
Alan Wace in 1922, during excavations at Asine

In 1920 and 1921, archaeologists of the British School at Athens under Alan Wace made small-scale excavations in the tomb for the purposes of establishing its date, including a trench in the dromos. During the campaigns of 1920–1923, Wace had the first architectural plans of the tomb drawn up by Piet de Jong.

Another effort was made in 1939, where Wace dug trenches on the outside of the dromos in line with the façade and beyond the eastern end of the dromos. Wace found that the façade and dromos were bonded together, showing that they were constructed together, and that the dromos had not previously been any larger than its present dimensions. The 1939 excavation also showed that the dromos had been dug through the so-called 'Bothros deposit', which included LH IIIA1 material, providing a terminus post quem for its construction.

In 1955, Wace dug trial trenches in the area around the tomb, containing large quantities of Mycenaean potsherds, which have been interpreted (in line with similar contemporary deposits at the Tomb of Clytemnestra) as offerings made to the tomb's occupants.

== Gallery ==
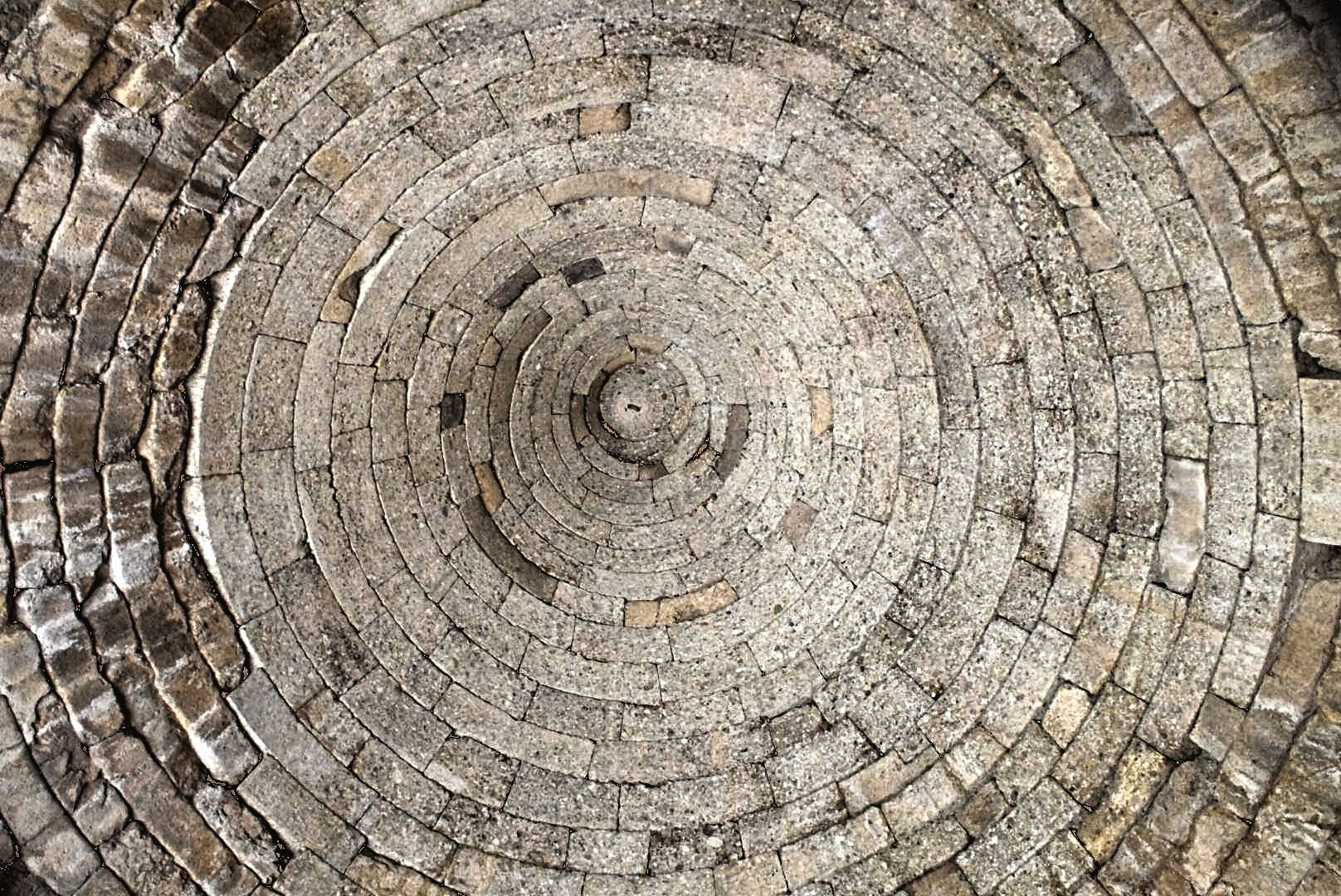
Dome of the treasury

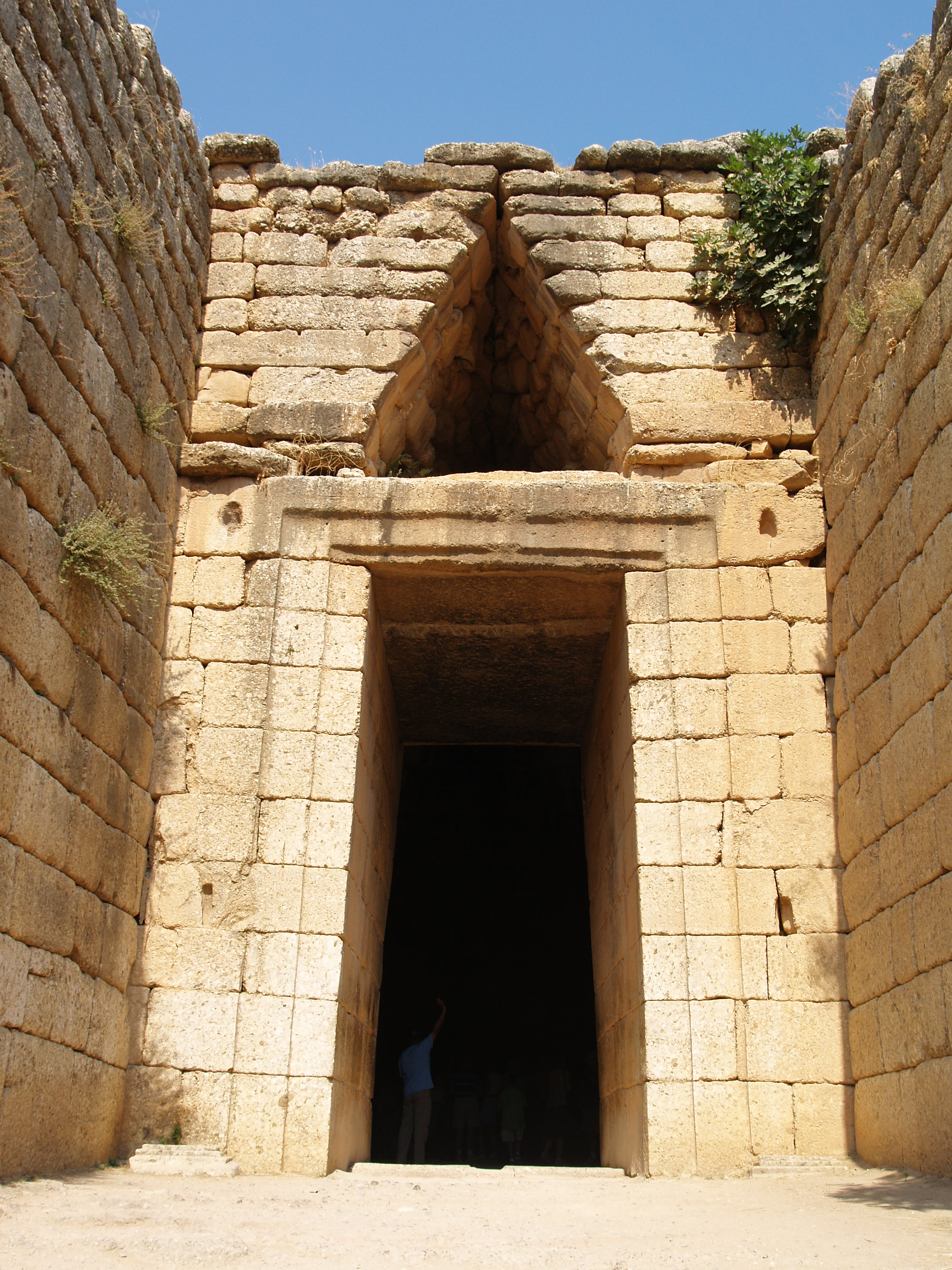
Detailed view of the entrance

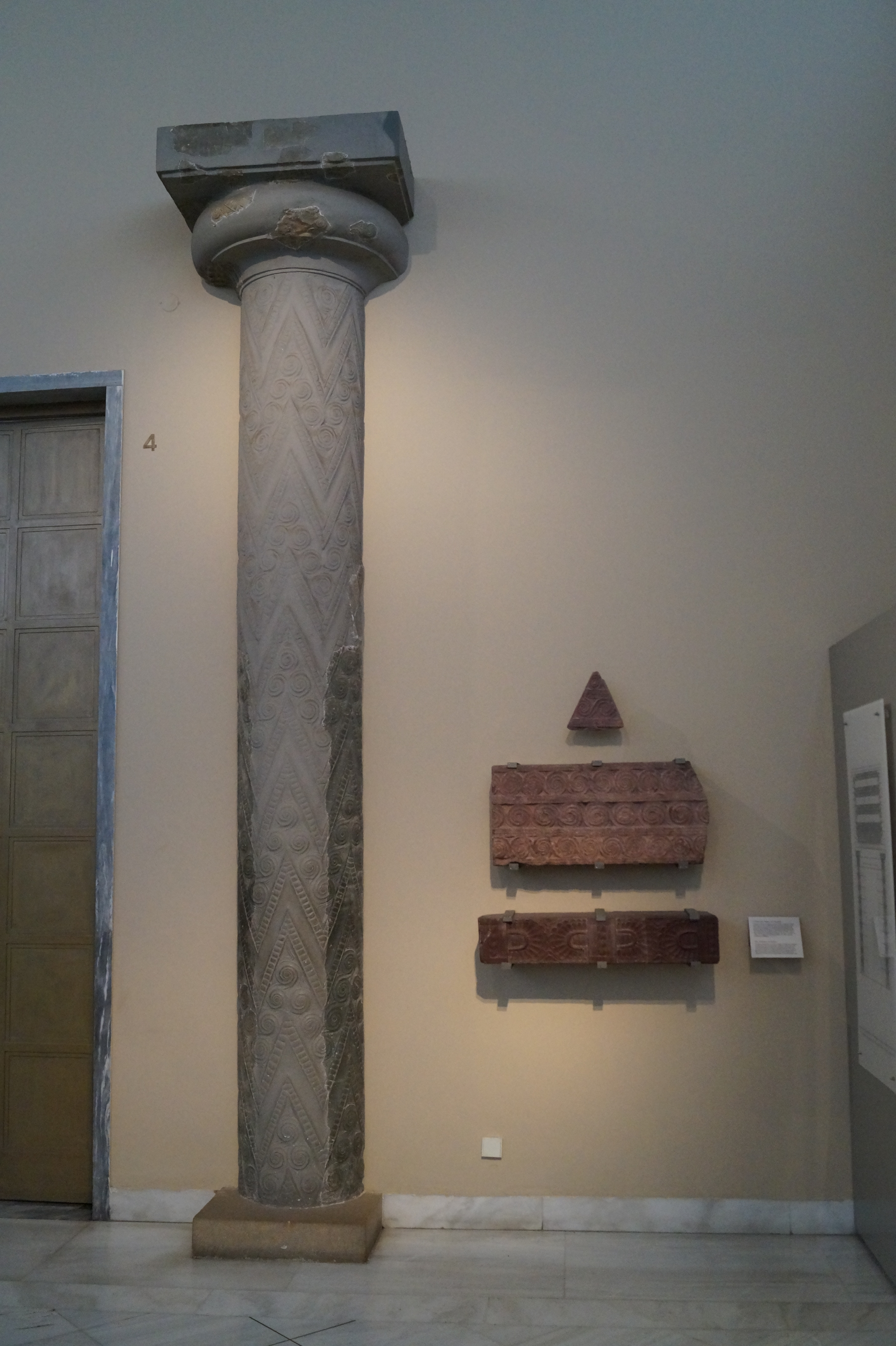
Reconstruction of a capital in the National Archeological Museum, Athens

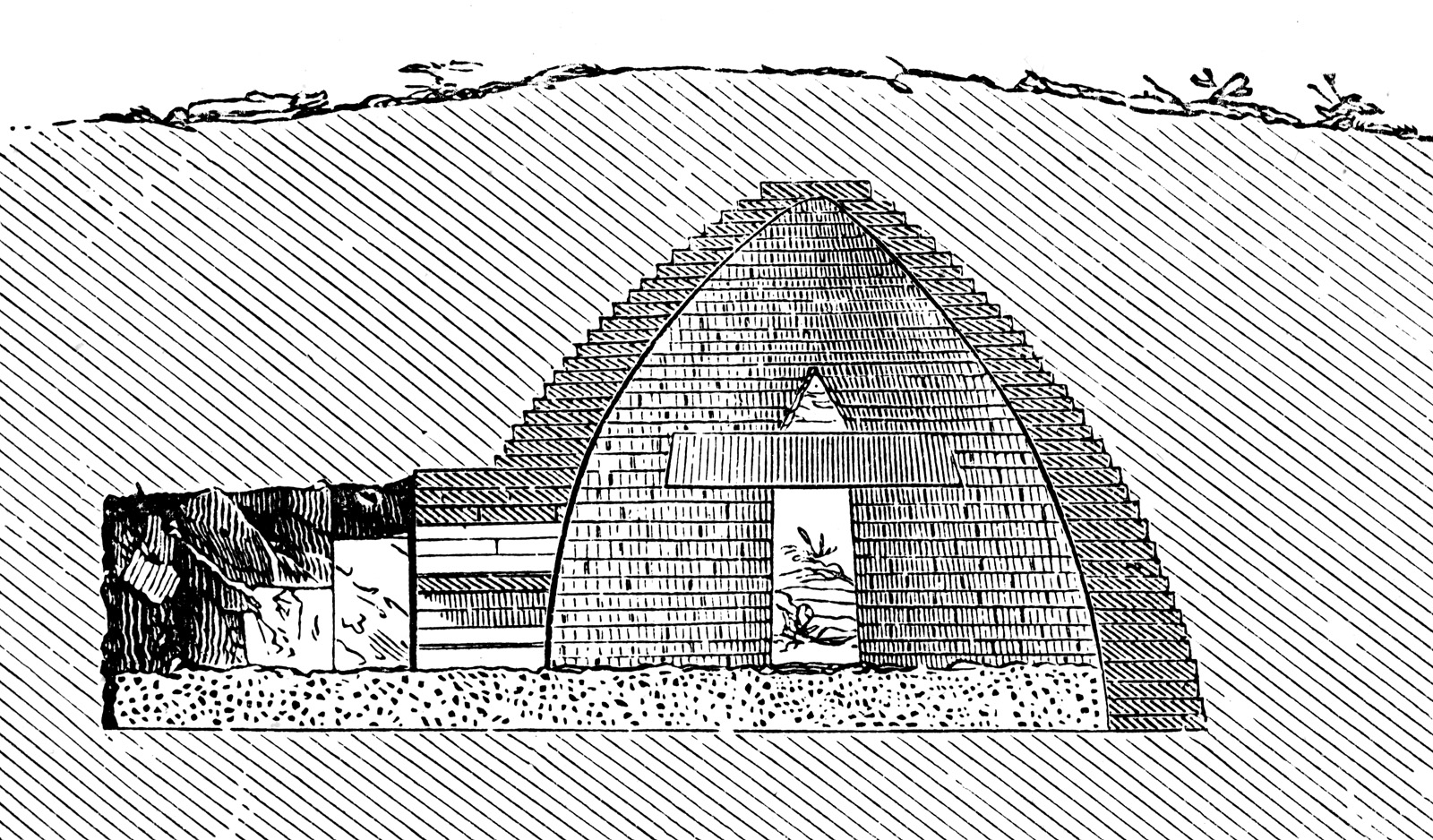
Section of the tomb

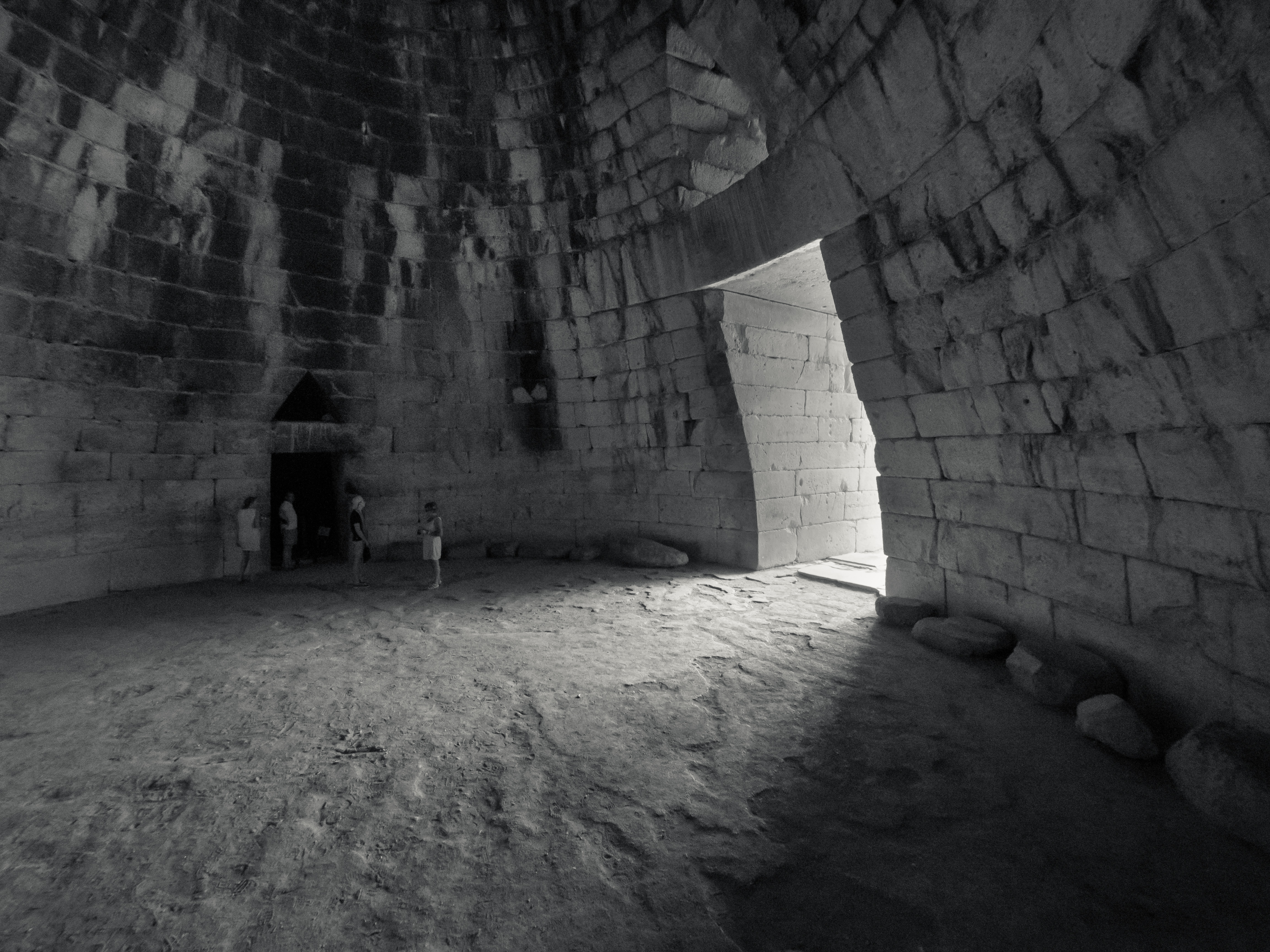
Interior

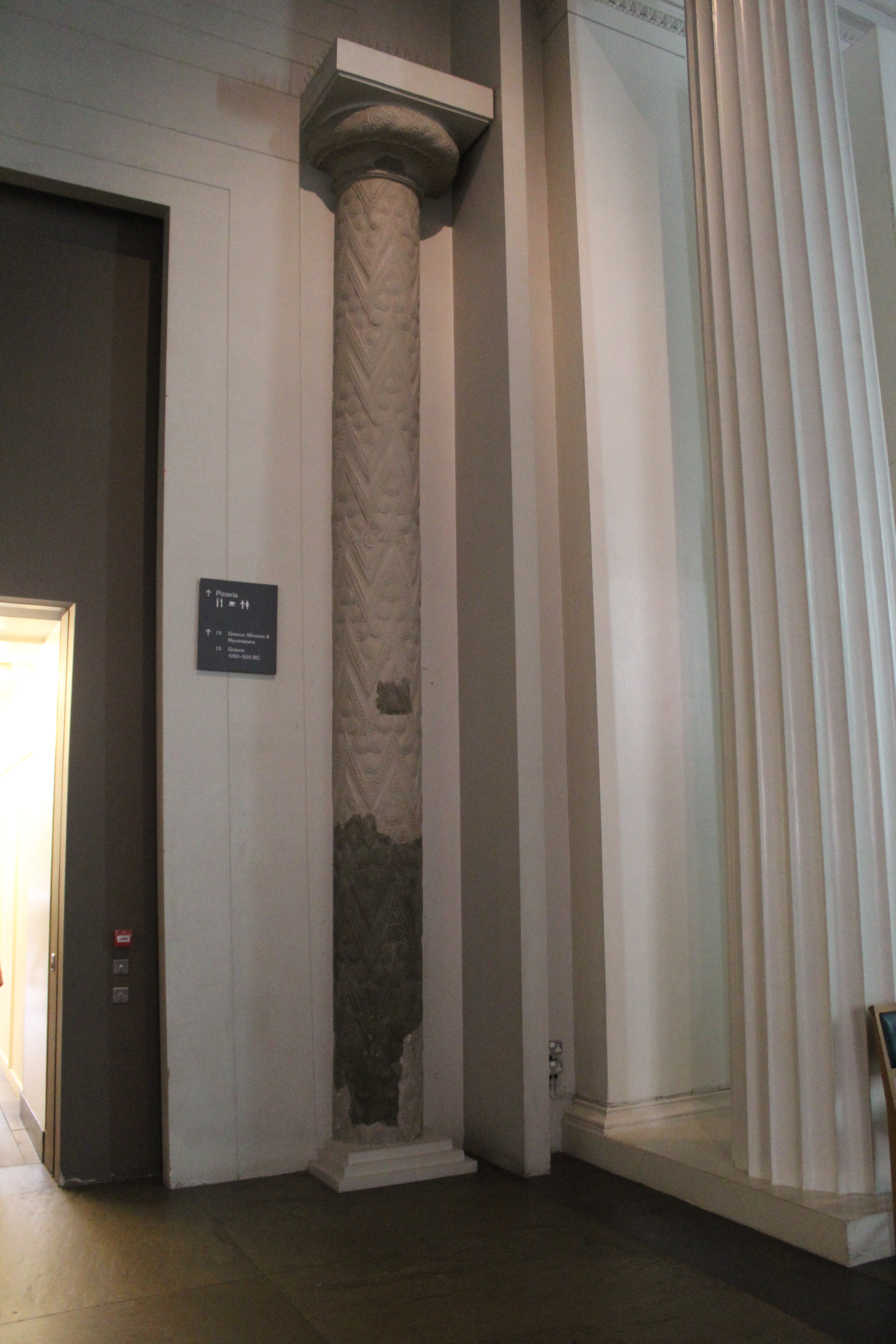
Part of the column in the British Museum

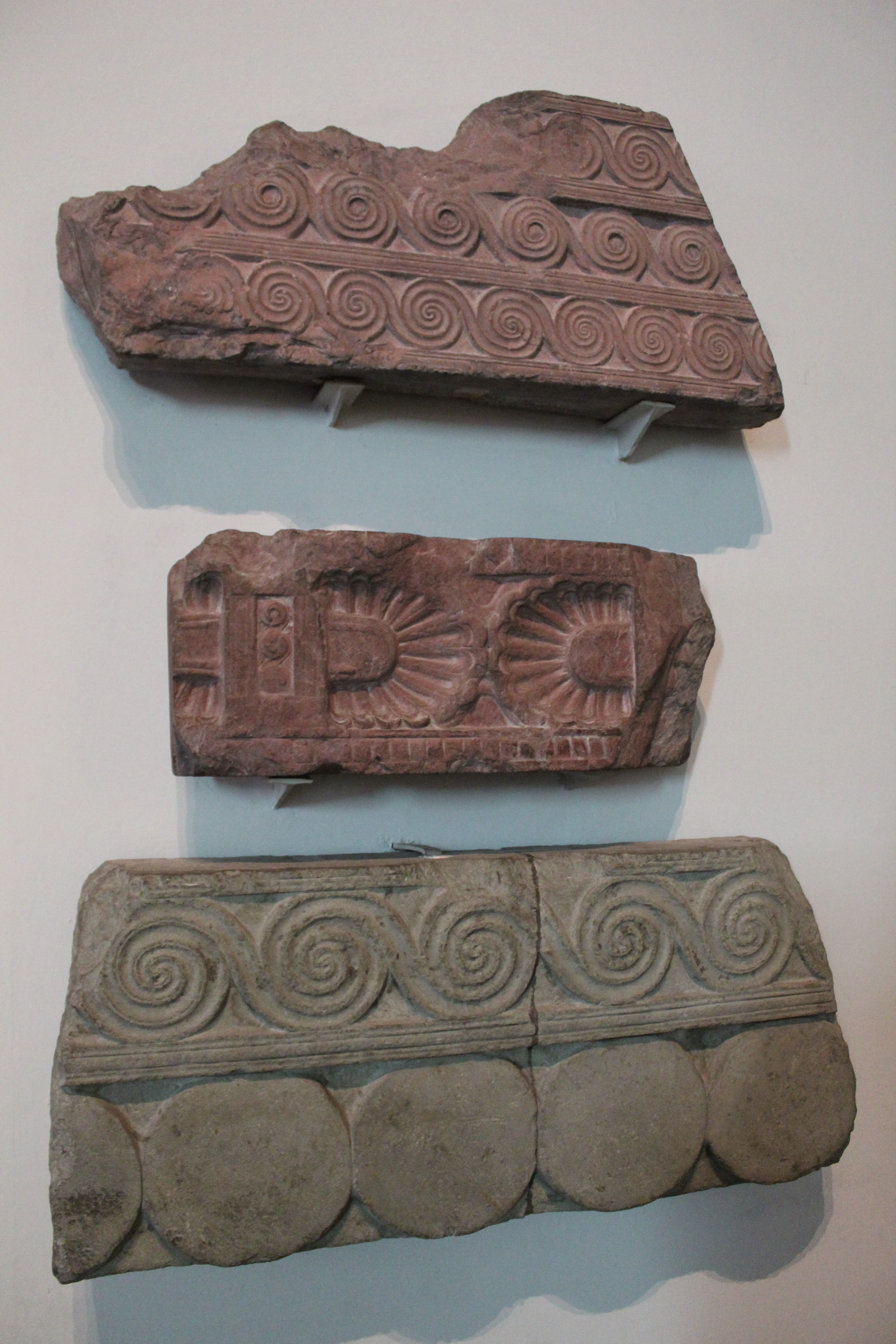
Fragments of the facade in the British Museum

== See also ==
- List of megalithic sites
- List of world's largest domes
- Early and simple domes

== Bibliography ==
- Alcock, Susan (1997). "The heroic past in a Hellenistic present". In Cartledge, Paul; Garnsey, Peter; Gruen, Erich (eds.). Hellenistic Constructs: Essays in Culture, History, and Historiography. Berkeley and Los Angeles: University of California Press. pp. 20–34.
- Antonaccio, Carla (1995). An Archaeology of Ancestors: Tomb Cult and Hero Cult in Early Greece. London: Rowman and Littlefield. ISBN 9780847679423.
- Antonaccio, Carla (1995). "Contesting the Past: Hero Cult, Tomb Cult, and Epic in Early Greece". American Journal of Archaeology. 98 (3): 389–410. doi:10.2307/506436. JSTOR 506436. S2CID 192969382.
- Boyd, Michael (2015). "Explaining the mortuary sequence at Mycenae". In Schallin, Ann-Louise; Tournavitou, Iphiyenia (eds.). Mycenaeans Up To Date: The archaeology of the north-eastern Peloponnese ― current concepts and new directions. Stockholm: Swedish Institute at Athens. pp. 433–447. ISBN 9789179160630.
- British Museum (2021). "Column". Archived from the original on 31 March 2022.
- Brysbaert, Anne; Vikatou, Irene; Stöger, Hanna (2020). "Highways and byways in Mycenaean Greece: Human-environment interactions in dialogue". Arctos. 55: 33–94. ISSN 0570-734X.
- Cavanagh, William G.; Mee, Christopher B. (1999). "Building the Treasury of Atreus". In Betancourt, P.P.; Karageorghis, V.; Laineur, R.; Niemeier, W.-D. (eds.). Meletemata: Studies in Aegean archaeology presented to Malcolm H. Wiener as he enters his 65th year (Aegaeum 20). Liège and Austin: University of Liège. pp. 93–102.
- Clarke, Edward Daniel (1814). Travels in Various Countries of Europa, Asia and Africa: Part the Second: Greece, Egypt and the Holy Land: Section the Second. London: T. Cadell and W. Davies. Archived from the original on 3 January 2023.
- Clay, Diskin (2009) [2007]. "Plato Philomythos". In Woodard, Roger D. (ed.). The Cambridge Companion to Greek Mythology. Cambridge University Press. pp. 210–236. doi:10.1017/CCOL9780521845205. ISBN 9780521845205.
- Dickinson, O.T.P.K.; Papazoglou-Manioudaki, Lena; Nafplioti, Argyro; Prag, A.J.N.W. (2012). "Mycenae Revisited Part 4: Assessing the New Data". The Annual of the British School at Athens. 107: 161–188. doi:10.1017/S0068245412000056. JSTOR 41721882. S2CID 162150714.
- Dirlik, Nil (2012). The Tholos Tombs of Mycenaean Greece (M.A.). Uppsala University.
- Droop, John Percival (1926). "Mycenae 1921–1923: Legitimate and Illegitimate Criticism". Annals of Archaeology and Anthropology. 13: 43–48.
- Evans, Arthur (1929). The Shaft Graves and Bee-Hive Tombs of Mycenae and their Inter-Relations. London.
- Fitzsimons, Rodney (2020). "Crossing Thresholds and Building States: Labor Investment, Tomb Construction, and Early State Formation in the Bronze Age Argolid". In Hasaki, Eleni; Bentz, Martin (eds.). Reconstructing Scales of Production in the Ancient Greek World: Producers, Processes, Products, People, Panel 3.4, Archaeology and Economy in the Ancient World 8. Heidelberg. pp. 17–38. doi:10.11588/propylaeum.639. ISBN 978-3-948465-33-9.
- French, Elizabeth (2013) [2002]. Mycenae: Agamemnon's Capital. Stroud: The History Press. ISBN 9780752419510.
- French, Elizabeth (2012). "Mycenae". In Cline, Eric (ed.). The Oxford Handbook of the Bronze Age Aegean. Oxford University Press. pp. 671–680. ISBN 9780199873609.
- Galanakis, Yannis (2007). "The Construction of the Aegisthus Tholos Tomb at Mycenae and the 'Helladic Heresy'". The Annual of the British School at Athens. 102: 239–256. doi:10.1017/S0068245400021481. JSTOR 30245251. S2CID 162590402.
- Gere, Cathy (2006). The Tomb of Agamemnon: Mycenae and the Search for a Hero. London: Profile Books. ISBN 9781861976178.
- Higgins, Reynold; Ellis, S.E.; Hope Simpson, Richard (1968). "The Façade of the Treasury of Atreus at Mycenae". The Annual of the British School at Athens. 63: 331–336. doi:10.1017/S0068245400014453. JSTOR 30103198. S2CID 129972305.
- Hitchcock, Louise A. (2012). "Mycenaean Architecture". In Cline, Eric (ed.). The Oxford Handbook of the Bronze Age Aegean. Oxford University Press. pp. 200–209. ISBN 9780199873609.
- Hope Simpson, Richard; Dickinson, O.T.P.K. (1979). A Gazetteer of Aegean Civilisation in the Bronze Age. Vol I: The Mainland and Islands. Goteborg. doi:10.2307/629926. JSTOR 629926. S2CID 162728968.
- Jameson, Michael H. (1990). "Perseus, the Hero of Mykenai". In Hägg, Robin; Nordquist, Gullög Christine (eds.). Celebrations of Death and Divinity in the Bronze Age Argolid. Stockholm. pp. 213–222.
- Karadimas, Nektarios; Momigliano, Nicoletta (2004). "On the term 'Minoan' before Evans' work in Crete (1894)". Studi Micenei ed Egeo Anatolici. 44 (2): 79–94.
- Lazar, N.A.; Kadane, J.B.; Chen, F.; Cavanagh, W.G.; Litton, C.D. (2004). "Corbelled Domes in Two and Three Dimensions: The Treasury of Atreus". International Statistical Review/Revue Internationale de Statistique. 72 (2): 239–255. JSTOR 1403856.
- Loughlin, Thomas (2021). "The Marquess and Mycenae". Archaeology Ireland. 35 (1): 44–48. JSTOR 27075191.
- March, Jenny (2009). The Penguin Book of Classical Myths. London: Penguin. ISBN 9780141020778.
- Mason, David J. (2013). "The Date of the Tomb of Clytemnestra". The Annual of the British School at Athens. 108 (1): 97–119. doi:10.1017/S0068245413000014. JSTOR 43188527. S2CID 191384405.
- Mason, David J. (2007). "The Location of the Treasury of Atreus". Oxford Journal of Archaeology. 26 (1): 35–52. doi:10.1111/j.1468-0092.2007.00272.x.
- Mee, Christopher (2012). "Death and Burial". In Cline, Eric (ed.). The Oxford Handbook of the Bronze Age Aegean. Oxford University Press. pp. 277–290. ISBN 9780199873609.
- Mickelson, M.E.; Mickelson, A.M. (2014). "Do Mycenaean tholos tombs encode astronomical alignments?". Mediterranean Archaeology and Archaeometry. 14 (3): 1–14.
- Moore, Dudley; Rowlands, Edward; Karadimas, Nektarios (2014). In Search of Agamemnon: Early Travellers to Mycenae. Newcastle upon Tyne: Cambridge Scholars Publishing. ISBN 978-1-4438-5776-5.
- Moore, Dudley (2015). In Search of the Classical World: An Introduction to the Ancient Aegean. Newcastle upon Tyne: Cambridge Scholars Publishing. ISBN 9781443881456.
- Moorehead, Caroline (2016). Priam's Gold: Schliemann and the Lost Treasures of Troy. London: Tauris Parke Paperbacks.
- Mylonas, George E. (1983). Mycenae Rich in Gold. Athens: Ekdotike Athenon.
- Myres, J.L. (1923). "Review: The Excavations at Korakou". The Classical Review. 37 (3/4): 71–73. doi:10.1017/S0009840X00041706. JSTOR 699488. S2CID 246875413.
- Nash, Theo (2017). Creta Capta: Late Minoan II Knossos in Mycenaean History (PDF) (M.A.). Victoria University of Wellington. Archived from the original (PDF) on 15 January 2023.
- Pelon, Olivier (1990). "Les tombes à tholos d'Argolide: Architecture et rituel funéraire". In Hägg, Robin; Nordquist, G.C. (eds.). Celebrations of Death and Divinity in the Bronze Age Argolid (in French). Stockholm: Swedish Institute at Athens. ISBN 9789179160210.
- Pelon, Olivier (1976). Tholoi, tumuli et cercles funeraires (in French). Paris: French School at Athens. ISBN 9782869583702.
- Pryce, F.N.; Smith, A.H. (1928). A Catalogue of Sculpture in the Department of Greek and Roman Antiquities in the British Museum: Volume 1. London: Trustees of the British Museum.
- Santillo Frizell, Barbro (1998). "Giants or Geniuses? Monumental Building at Mycenae". Current Swedish Archaeology. 6. Archived from the original on 8 January 2023.
- Schliemann, Heinrich (1878). Mycenae: A Narrative of Researches and Discoveries at Mycenae and Tiryns. London: John Murray. OCLC 1339980582.
- Shelmerdine, Cynthia (2008). "Introduction: Background, Methods and Sources". In Shelmerdine, Cynthia (ed.). The Cambridge Companion to the Aegean Bronze Age. Cambridge: Cambridge University Press. pp. 1–18.
- Smith, A.H. (1916). "Lord Elgin and His Collection". The Journal of Hellenic Studies. 36: 163–372. doi:10.2307/625773. JSTOR 625773. S2CID 163053341.
- Tsountas, Christos (1897). The Mycenaean Age: A Study of the Monuments and Culture of Pre-Homeric Greece. London.
- Wace, Alan (1923). "Excavations at Mycenae § IX — The Tholos Tombs". The Annual of the British School at Athens. 25: 283–402. doi:10.1017/S0068245400010352. S2CID 183795426.
- Wace, Alan (1940). "The Treasury of Atreus". Antiquity. 14 (55): 233–249. doi:10.1017/S0003598X00015234. ISSN 0003-598X. S2CID 162739311.
- Wace, Alan (1956). "Mycenae 1939–1955, Part I: Preliminary Report on the Excavations of 1955". Annual of the British School at Athens. 51: 103–122. doi:10.1017/S0068245400018803. JSTOR 30096806. S2CID 159836724.
- Wace, Alan; Blegen, Carl (1918). "The Pre-Mycenaean Pottery of the Mainland". The Annual of the British School at Athens. 22: 175–189. doi:10.1017/S0068245400009916. JSTOR 30096516. S2CID 163842512.
- Watkin, David (2005) [1986]. A History of Western Architecture. London: Laurence King Publishing. ISBN 978-1-85669-459-9.
- Wilson, N. G. (2013). Encyclopedia of Ancient Greece. New York. ISBN 978-1-136-78799-7. OCLC 862746243.
- Wright, James C. (2006). "The Social Production of Space and the Architectural Reproduction of Society in the Bronze Age Aegean during the 2nd Millennium B.C.E.". In Maran, Joseph; Juwig, Carsten; Schwengel, Hermann; Thaler, Ulrich (eds.). Constructing Power: Architecture, Ideology and Social Practice. Hamburg: Lit Verlag. pp. 49–69. ISBN 9783825893149.
- Wright, James (1987). "Death and Power at Mycenae: Changing Symbols in Mortuary Practice". In Laffineur, Robert (ed.). Les coutumes funéraires en Égée à l'âge du Bronze. Actes du colloque de Liège, 21-23 avril 1986 (Aegaeum 1). Liège. pp. 171–184.
- Zekiou, Olga (2019). The Poetics of the Homeric Citadel. Newcastle-upon-Tyne: Cambridge Scholars Publishing. ISBN 9781527527010.
