= Richard Hope Simpson =

British classical archaeologist (1930–2016)

- Hope Simpson, around his retirement in 1993
- Born: 12 May 1930; United Kingdom
- Died: 11 November 2016 (aged 86); Kingston, Ontario
- Occupation: Academic
- Spouse: Jennifer Hope Simpson (née Crick) (m. 1958)
- Children: 2

Academic background
- Education: St John's College, Oxford (M.A.), University of London (PhD)
- Thesis: The topography of Mycenaean Greece in relation to the Achaean section of the Homeric Catalogue of the Ships

Academic work
- Discipline: Classical archaeology
- Sub-discipline: Archaeological survey, Mycenaean archaeology
- Institutions: University of Birmingham, University of Toronto, Queen's University at Kingston

Richard Hope Simpson (1930–2016) was a British classical archaeologist, known for his work in archaeological survey and the study of Mycenaean Greece. For most of his career, he taught at Queen's University in Kingston, Ontario.

A leading figure in Greek field survey throughout the 1960s, 1970s and 1980s, Hope Simpson played a major role in the University of Minnesota Messenia Expedition and in the production of several of the key gazetteers of Mycenaean civilisation in Greece. His work was significant in allowing an understanding of Mycenaean states, particularly in Messenia, beyond the relatively small number of large, well-known and excavated sites. In the 1960s, his projects pioneered new methods of extensive survey, including the use of remote sensing via aerial photography.

Hope Simpson believed in the essential historicity of the Homeric epics and produced several works, including his doctoral thesis, attempting to locate the toponyms of the Iliad with the archaeological sites known from Mycenaean Greece. The archaeologist Sinclair Hood described him as "an apostle of Common Sense".

== Early life and education ==
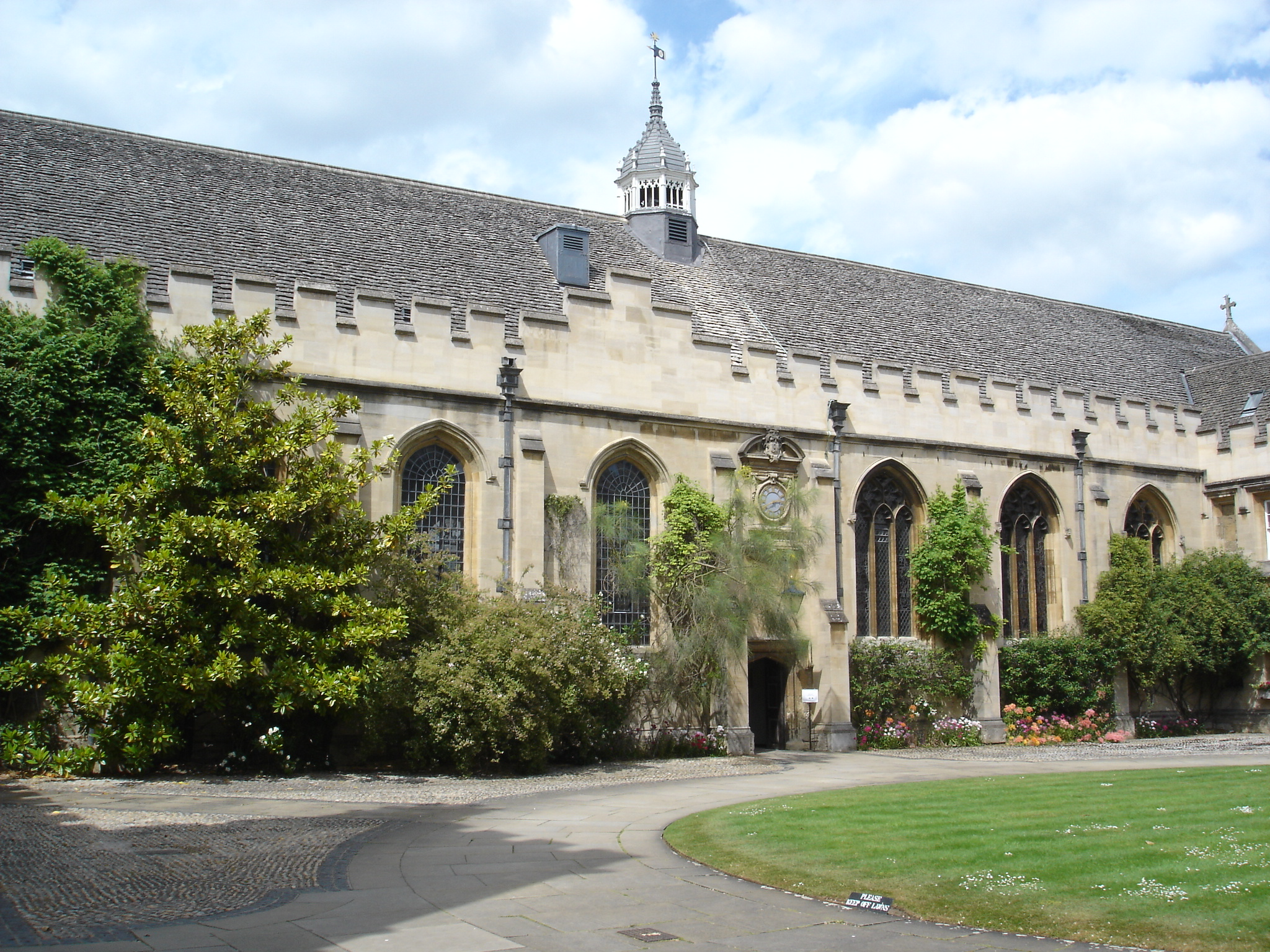
The Quad of St John's College, Oxford, where Hope Simpson studied between 1950 and 1955

Hope Simpson was born on 12 May 1930, the middle of three brothers. His father, John Whitwell Hope Simpson, was a GP. He was a distant relative of Sir John Hope Simpson, the civil servant, MP and diplomat.

He studied literae humaniores (Classics) at St John's College in the University of Oxford, matriculating in 1950. After graduating, he remained at Oxford for the 1954–1955 academic year to pursue a Diploma in Classical Archaeology. His tutor was Dorothea Gray, to whom he later credited his interest in Greek prehistory, and with whom he would undertake some of his early survey work in Greece.

While at Oxford, he attended the British School at Athens's undergraduate summer course, where he met then-director Sinclair Hood. He continued to the University of London to study for his PhD From 1956 to 1958, he returned to the British School at Athens on a school studentship. He submitted his thesis, The Topography of Mycenaean Greece in Relation to the Achaean Section of the Homeric Catalogue of the Ships, in November 1962.

== Academic career ==
=== Early career: 1956–1960 ===
In 1959, Hope Simpson was awarded the first Michael Ventris Memorial Award for Mycenaean Studies, given by the Institute of Classical Studies to promising young scholars in the field of Mycenaean or Minoan studies. He was most known and prolific in the field of archaeological survey, and his many contributions to large-scale landscape surveys of Mycenaean sites. In the spring of 1957, while still a doctoral student, he had completed a survey of the Spercheios Valley in Phthiotis in central Greece, alongside his frequent collaborator John Lazenby.

Between 1956 and 1958, he made an extensive survey of Laconia, including the islands of Kythera and Antikythera, alongside Helen Waterhouse and at the encouragement of Alan Wace. Like most of his future survey work, the expedition consisted largely of the collection and cataloguing of surface finds, with the view to identifying and mapping sites of Mycenaean habitation. The Laconia survey significantly increased the number of known Mycenaean sites in the region, and remained widely cited into the 21st century. In the spring of 1956–7, he spent seven weeks surveying in south-eastern Messenia, with the assistance of David French, and later published his work as "Identifying a Mycenaean State", in which he linked his discoveries with the seven cities promised to Achilles by Agamemnon in the Iliad. His belief in the essential correspondence between the place-names of the Homeric poems and the geography of the Mycenaean period led him to write, with John Lazenby, The Catalogue of Ships in Homer's Iliad, which attempted to match the places named in the Iliad with those known from archaeological survey. Contemporary reviews, however, questioned the value of the Catalogue as an historical document, pointing to its essentially poetic nature as well as its composition over many centuries, and most modern scholars consider the attempt to find archaeological evidence for the historicity of the Homeric poems to be fundamentally misguided.

Between 1960 and 1970, Hope Simpson and Lazenby worked together on a further survey of the Dodecanese.

==== The University of Minnesota Messenia Expedition ====
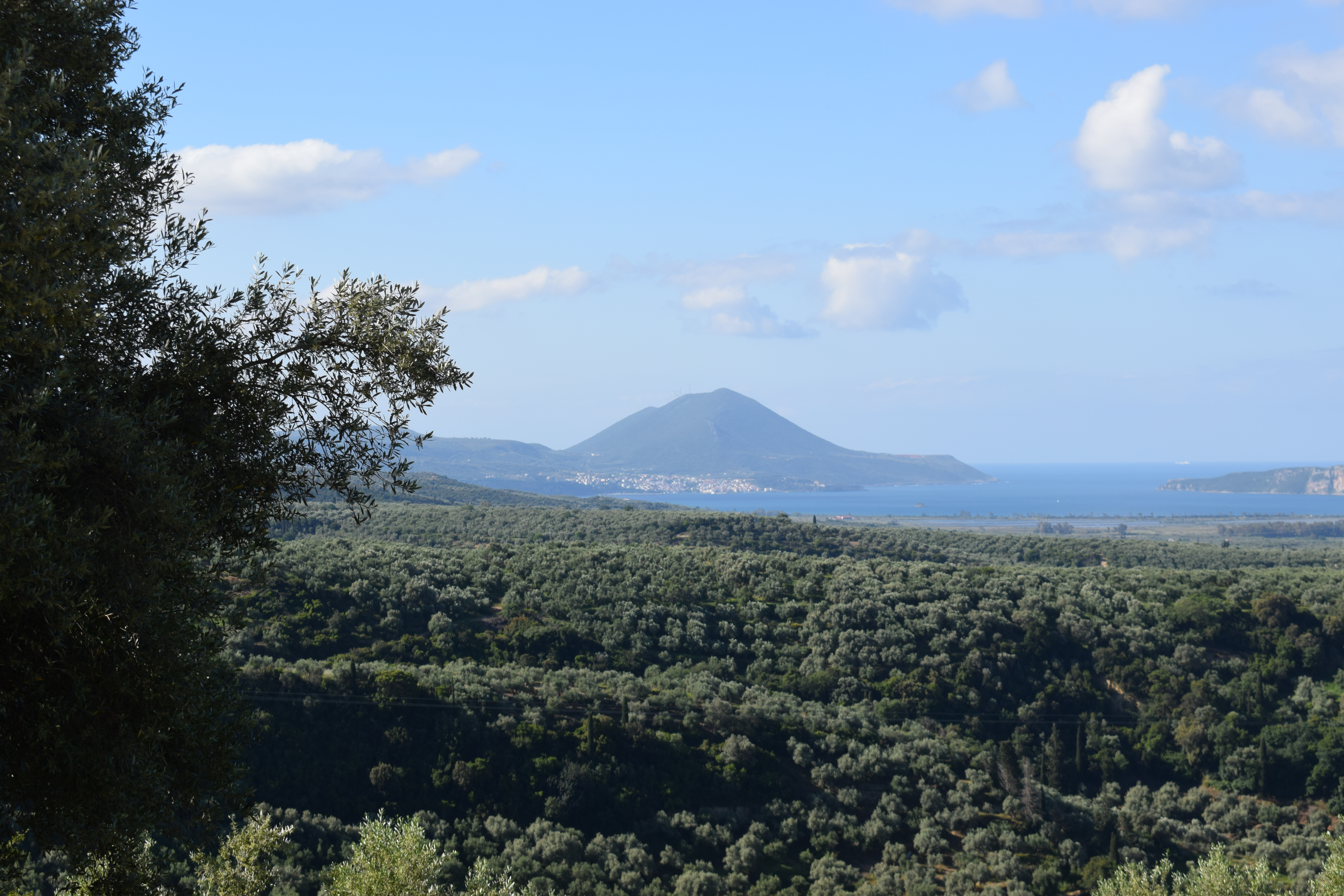
A view from the so-called 'Palace of Nestor' in Messenia, looking over ground surveyed by Hope Simpson and the University of Minnesota Messenia Expedition throughout the 1960s

In 1958, he joined William McDonald in what would become the University of Minnesota Messenia Expedition, surveying Mycenaean sites in Messenia. The approach of this survey, which came to be known as the "Hope Simpson method" (though McDonald always claimed it as a joint decision, even to later critics), typified his later work: broad, extensive survey based on surface finds; a focus on site function as well as distribution; and the recording of information relevant to as many periods of history as possible. By 1962, the expedition was formally constituted with a team of five: in addition to McDonald and Hope Simpson, three of McDonald's colleagues from the University of Minnesota: Jesse Fant, Herbert E. Wright and Fred Lukerman. From 1966 to 1968, owing to McDonald's illness, Hope Simpson served as field director of the project.

The methods of the UMME were innovative in several ways. Firstly, they made extensive use of aerial photography, provided by the Hellenic Air Force during the summers, to identify promising sites for investigation, enabling them to cover far more ground than previous surveys. Secondly, with the assistance of John Chadwick of the University of Cambridge, they attempted to match the sites identified in their survey to the toponyms known from the Linear B archive of the so-called "Palace of Nestor"' at Pylos, excavated by Carl Blegen in 1939 but only made legible with Chadwick and Michael Ventris's decipherment of the Linear B script, completed in 1952–1953 and published in 1956. While this approach was later criticised for its propensity to miss smaller sites, particularly those whose location did not conform to expected patterns of settlement, it revealed over 200 habitation sites across an area of 3,500 km^{2}, and has been described as "a prodigious influence on the development of archaeology in Greece", opening the possibility for the first time of the study of Mycenaean geography.

During the UMME season of August 1966, Hope Simpson travelled to the marble quarries at Kypranion in Laconia, recovering samples which he used in collaboration with Reynold Higgins and S. E. Ellis to demonstrate that these were the source for the red and green marble used on the façade of the Treasury of Atreus at Mycenae.

=== Teaching, research and survey: 1960–1991 ===
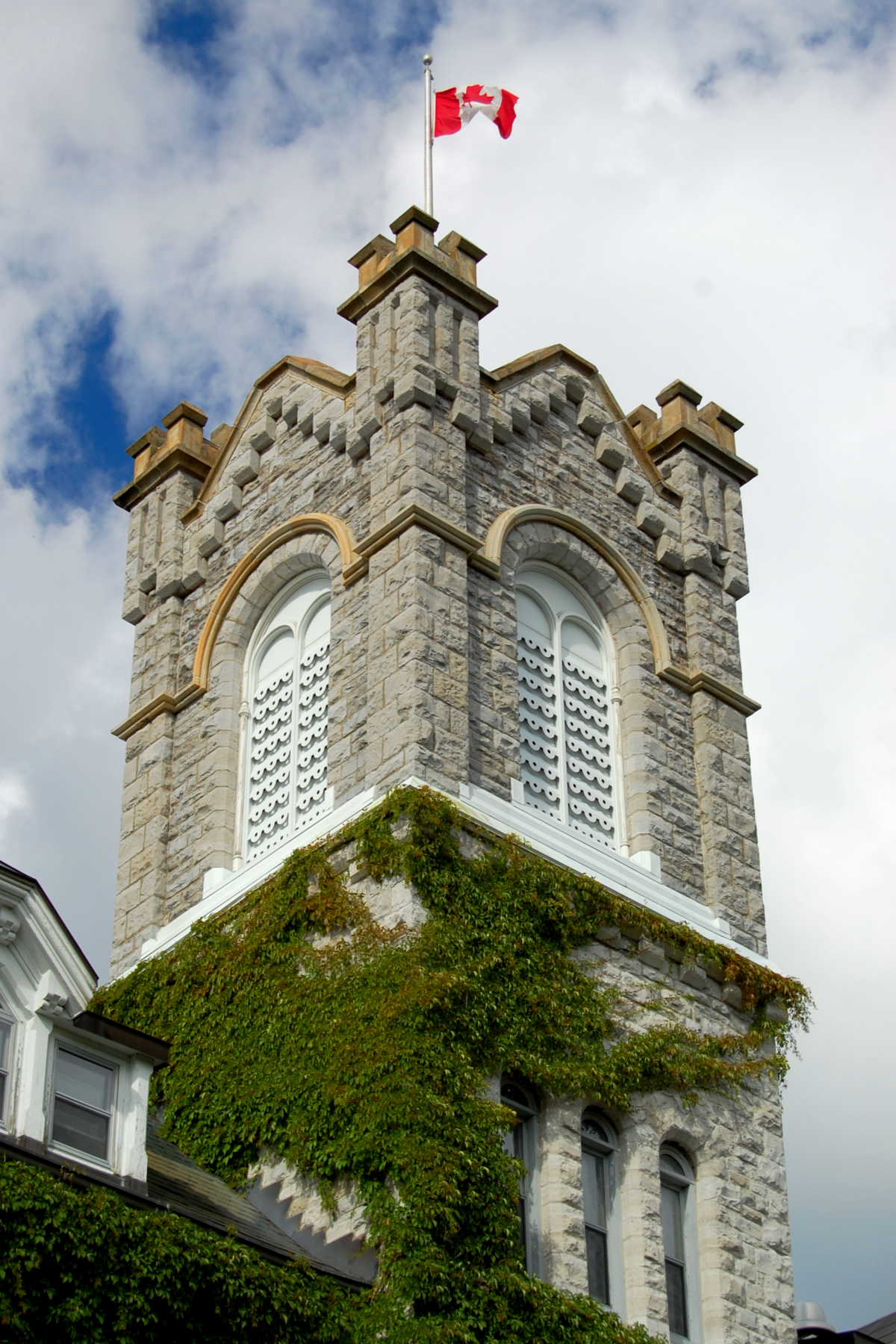
Theological Hall at Queen's University, Kingston, where Hope Simpson taught between 1964 and 1993

Hope Simpson left London in 1960, and worked as a Research Fellow at the University of Birmingham until 1963, when he emigrated to Canada. He taught for a year at the University of Toronto before moving in 1964 to Queen's University, Kingston to take up a professorship in Classics and Archaeology, a position he would hold until his retirement in 1993.

Throughout the succeeding decades, Hope Simpson's main scholarly contribution was in the production of gazetteers of prehistoric sites throughout Greece. In 1965, he published A Gazetteer and Atlas of Mycenaean Sites, cataloguing over 600 sites throughout the Greek mainland and islands, as well as the coast of Asia Minor. In 1969, at the suggestion of Hector Catling, he began working with Oliver (O. T. P. K.) Dickinson, originally a Sir James Knott fellow at Newcastle University, from 1972 until 1975 a Research Fellow at the University of Birmingham, on what was published in 1979 as the first volume of A Gazetteer of Aegean Civilisation in the Bronze Age. He followed this in 1982 with Mycenaean Greece, a gazetteer in all but name, incorporating material from central Macedonia and more sites in Asia Minor. This publication was praised for its thorough coverage and inclusion of maps and plans, including an early effort to address the question of roads and routeways in Mycenaean Greece, which later formed the basis of his 2006 book (with D. K. Hagel), Mycenaean Fortifications, Highways, Dams and Canals. However, the book was criticised for adding few sites to the corpus of his 1979 work, and for failing to incorporate methodological advances in survey techniques since the early 1970s. By 1983, such large-scale gazetteers, making use of extensive survey to catalogue sites in a diachronic manner, could be described as "the familiar Hope Simpson format".

From 1977 to 1979, along with Joseph Shaw, he conducted the survey of the Kommos region of southern Crete — a survey which, by the time of the project's eventual publication in 1995, was noted as embodying the "pioneering" methods of the UMME but as suffering from the lack of methods and techniques which had, in the intervening two decades, become standard in Greek field survey. In particular, the relatively unsystematic nature of the collection and interpretation of survey data was judged by Jack Davis as leading to "methodological imprecision [which] often detracts from the potential usefulness of the data". Indeed, by 1982, his methods, which had been described as "pioneering" for the 1950s and 1960s, were labelled as "cautious" and "traditional".

From 1985 to 1991, he directed the intensive survey of the island of Pseira, near Crete, uncovering 315 prehistoric sites ranging chronologically from the Neolithic to the Byzantine period. From 1986 to 1988, he took part in the excavation of the fortified Mycenaean settlement of Kiapha Thiti in Attica, directed by the Canadian Institute in Greece — a rare example of a fortified non-palatial Mycenaean site, which provided evidence of construction techniques attested nowhere else in the Mycenaean world.

=== Later career and retirement ===
From 1990 to 1995, he served on the advisory board of the Pylos Regional Archaeological Project, led by Jack Davis, which aimed to supplement the work done by Hope Simpson and McDonald through the UMME survey with detailed, small-scale intensive study of Messenian sites and landscapes. He retired from Queen's University in 1993: in retirement, he published two further books, Mycenaean Fortification, Highways, Dams and Canals (2006, with Hagel) and Mycenaean Messenia and the Kingdom of Pylos (2014).

His final book, Mycenaean Greece and the Homeric Tradition, was published posthumously in open access in 2018.

== Personal life ==
In 1958, Hope Simpson married Jennifer Crick. Throughout the 1950s, the couple had surveyed widely, both together and separately, in Greece, generating data which formed much of the foundation for Hope Simpson's 1965 gazetteer. They had two children: Allan Hope Simpson (1962–2012), a writer, poet and musician, and David (born 1965), an engineer.

Hope Simpson's younger brother, Robert, predeceased him. His elder brother, James, also read classics (at Queens' College, Cambridge) after attending Shrewsbury School. He had a long career as a schoolmaster in Britain, at The King's School, Canterbury, Bedford School and in the comprehensive sector.

== Selected works ==
=== Books ===
- Hope Simpson, Richard (1965). A Gazetteer and Atlas of Mycenaean Sites. Oxford University Press.
- Hope Simpson, Richard; Lazenby, John (1970). The Catalogue of Ships in Homer's Iliad. Oxford: Clarendon Press.
- Hope Simpson, Richard; Dickinson, O. T. P. K. (1979). A Gazetteer of Aegean Civilisation in the Bronze Age. Vol. 1: The Mainland and Islands. Gothenburg: Paul Åströms Förlag.
- Hope Simpson, Richard (1982). Mycenaean Greece. Park Ridge, New Jersey: Noyes Press – via Internet Archive.
- Hope Simpson, Richard; Hagel, D. K. (2006). Mycenaean Fortifications, Highways, Dams and Canals. Sävedalen: Paul Åströms Förlag.
- — (2014). Mycenaean Messenia and the Kingdom of Pylos. Philadelphia: INSTAP Academic Press.
- — (2018). Mycenaean Greece and the Homeric Tradition. Queen's University, Kingston.

=== Articles ===
- Hope Simpson, Richard (1957). "Identifying a Mycenaean State". The Annual of the British School at Athens. 52: 231–259. JSTOR 30104414.
- — (1958–1959). "Nemesis: A Mycenaean Settlement near the Menidi Tholos Tomb". The Annual of the British School at Athens. 53/54: 292–294. JSTOR 30104469.
- Hope Simpson, Richard; Lazenby, John (1962). "Notes from the Dodecanese". The Annual of the British School at Athens. 57: 154–175. doi:10.1017/S0068245400013678.
- Hope Simpson, Richard; Lazenby, John (1970). "Notes from the Dodecanese II". The Annual of the British School at Athens. 65: 47–77. JSTOR 30103209.
- Hope Simpson, Richard; Lazenby, John (1973). "Notes from the Dodecanese III". The Annual of the British School at Athens. 68: 127–179. JSTOR 30103273.
- Hope Simpson, Richard (2003). "The Dodecanese and the Ahhiyawa Question". Annual of the British School at Athens. 98: 203–237. JSTOR 30073207.
- — (2006). "Interdisciplinary Survey in Messenia, Southwest Peloponnese, Greece". Geoarchaeology. 22: 111–120.

== Bibliography ==
- Betancourt, Philip; Davaras, Costas; Hope Simpson, Richard, eds. (2004). Pseira VIII: The Archaeological Survey of Pseira Island, Part 1 (Prehistory Monographs 11). Philadelphia: INSTAP Academic Press.
- Canadian Institute in Greece (2013). "Kiapha Thiti Excavation Project". Portal to the Past: Digital Archive of Archaeological Projects and Research. Canadian Institute in Greece. Archived from the original on 3 December 2022.
- Davis, Jack; Alcock, Susan; Bennet, John; Lolos, Yannis; Shelmerdine, Cynthia (1997). "The Pylos Regional Archaeological Project, Part I: Overview and the Archaeological Survey". Hesperia. 66 (3): 391–494. JSTOR 148395.
- Davis, Jack (2022). A Greek State in Formation: The Origins of Civilisation in Mycenaean Pylos. Oakland, California: University of California Press.
- Davis, Jack (1998). "Reviewed Work(s): Kommos: An Excavation on the South Coast of Crete. Volume I: The Kommos Region and Houses of the Minoan Town. Part I: The Kommos Region, Ecology, and Minoan Industries by Joseph W. Shaw and Maria C. Shaw". Journal of Field Archaeology. 25 (4): 525–529. doi:10.2307/530644. JSTOR 530644.
- Davis, Jack (1983). "Mycenaean Greece, by Richard Hope Simpson, Pp. x + 246, figs. 15, pls. 32. Noyes Press". American Journal of Archaeology. 87 (1): 108–109. doi:10.2307/504678. JSTOR 504678.
- Hudson, Richard, ed. (2020). "Salopian Club News" (PDF). The Salopian. Oxford.
- Greenberg, Bayle Z., ed. (15 November 1962). "University of Minnesota Staff Bulletin" (PDF). University of Minnesota Staff Bulletin.
- Gallou, Chrysanthi (2009). "Epidaurus Limera: the tale of a Laconian site in Mycenaean times". British School at Athens Studies. 16: 85–93.
- Higgins, Reynold; Ellis, S.E.; Hope Simpson, Richard (1968). "The Façade of the Treasury of Atreus at Mycenae". The Annual of the British School at Athens. 63: 331–336. doi:10.1017/S0068245400014453. JSTOR 30103198. S2CID 129972305.
- Hood, Sinclair (1983). "The Sites of Mycenaean Greece — Richard Hope Simpson: Mycenaean Greece. Pp. x 246; 15 maps (A–O and key map for mainland Greece), 15 text figures (maps and plans), 32 plates of photographs at end. Park Ridge, New Jersey: Noyes Press, 1981. $45". The Classical Review. 33 (2): 284–285. doi:10.1017/S0009840X00111953. S2CID 246876922.
- Hope Simpson, Richard; Dickinson, O.T.P.K. (1979). A Gazetteer of Aegean Civilisation in the Bronze Age: Volume 1: The Mainland and Islands. Gothenburg: Paul Åströms Förlag. ISBN 9789185058815.
- Hope Simpson, Richard (2018). Mycenaean Greece and the Homeric Tradition. Queen's University, Kingston.
- Hope Simpson, Richard (2014). Mycenaean Messenia and the Kingdom of Pylos. INSTAP Academic Press. ISBN 978-1-931534-75-8.
- Hope Simpson, Richard; Lazenby, John (1970). The Catalogue of Ships in Homer's Iliad. Oxford: Clarendon Press.
- Hope Simpson, Richard (1965). A Gazetteer and Atlas of Mycenaean Sites. Oxford: Oxford University Press.
- Hope Simpson, Richard (1957). "Identifying a Mycenaean State". Annual of the British School at Athens. 52: 231–259. doi:10.1017/S0068245400013009. S2CID 163279075.
- James Reid Funeral Home (11 November 2016). "Richard "Dick" Hope Simpson". James Reid Funeral Home.
- Lang, Mabel (1972). "Reviewed Work(s): The Catalogue of the Ships in Homer's Iliad by R. Hope Simpson and J. F. Lazenby" (PDF). The American Journal of Philology. 93 (4): 602–605. doi:10.2307/294353. JSTOR 294353.
- McDonald, William; Rapp, George, eds. (1972). The Minnesota Messenia Expedition: Reconstructing a Bronze Age Regional Environment. Minneapolis: University of Minnesota Press.
- McDonald, William; Hope Simpson, Richard (1969). "Further Explorations in Southwestern Peloponnese, 1964–1968". American Journal of Archaeology. 73 (2): 123–177. doi:10.2307/502778. JSTOR 502778. S2CID 191396062.
- McDonald, William (1984). "The Minnesota Messenia Survey: A Look Back". Studies Presented to Sterling Dow on his Eightieth Birthday. Durham, North Carolina. pp. 185–192.
- Pease, Charles E.G. (5 February 2021), "Descendants of Richard Jowitt" (PDF), Pease Family Index, archived from the original (PDF) on 24 October 2021
- Pylos Regional Archaeological Project (2010). "Project Participants". Archived from the original on 25 April 2019.
- Rutter, Jeremy (1982). "Richard Hope Simpson. Mycenaean Greece. Park Ridge, NJ: Noyes Press, 1982. Pp. x, 246; (plus) 86 ill. on 32 pls.; (incl.) numerous maps, plans, and ill. $45.00". The Classical World. 75 (5): 313.
- Taylour, William (1966). "R. Hope Simpson. A Gazetteer and Atlas of Mycenaean Sites. University of London, Institute of Classical Studies, Bulletin Supplement No. 16, 1965. 200 pp., 5 maps (including 1 in pocket). 50s". Antiquity. 40 (159): 243–244. doi:10.1017/S0003598X0003266X. S2CID 163716355.
- Waterhouse, Helen; Hope Simpson, Richard (1960). "Prehistoric Laconia: Part I". The Annual of the British School at Athens. 55: 67–107. doi:10.1017/S0068245400013290. S2CID 210050738.
- Whitley, James (2020). "Homer and History". In Pache, Corinne Ondine; Dué, Casey; Lupack, Susan; Lamberton, Robert (eds.). The Cambridge Guide to Homer. Cambridge: Cambridge University Press. pp. 257–266. ISBN 978-1-1070-2719-0.
- Whyte, William, ed. (2017). "In Memoriam" (PDF). TW: The Magazine of St John's College, Oxford. Oxford.
