= Dorothea Gray =

British archaeologist (1905–1983)

Dorothea Helen Forbes Gray OBE FSA
- Born: 1905
- Died: 3 July 1983 (aged 77–78)

Academic background
- Education: Bournemouth High School; Somerville College, Oxford

Academic work
- Discipline: Classical archaeology
- Institutions: St Leonards School; St Hugh's College, Oxford
- Notable students: G. E. M. Anscombe; Richard Hope Simpson; Mervyn Popham

Dorothea Helen Forbes Gray OBE FSA (1905 – 3 July 1983) was a British classicist. For almost all of her career, she taught at St Hugh's College, Oxford, where she became known for her advocacy of pre-classical Greek archaeology (then known as "Homeric") in a period when the discipline was out of favour at the university. In addition to her college work, she worked for the British government during the Second World War and took part in excavations at Mycenae, Smyrna, on Chios and at Myrtou. Her students included the philosopher G. E. M. Anscombe and the archaeologists Richard Hope Simpson and Mervyn Popham, who both followed her into the study of the Aegean Bronze Age.

== Biography ==
Dorothea Helen Forbes Gray was born in 1905. As a child, she suffered an attack of polio which rendered her lame for life. She was educated at Bournemouth High School, a private girls' school, before receiving a scholarship in 1924 to study classics at Somerville College, Oxford. She subsequently spent a year conducting research on a Gilchrist Scholarship, followed by five years teaching at St Leonards School in St Andrews, Scotland.

In 1934, Gray was appointed as a tutor in classics at the all-women St Hugh's College, Oxford. She was promoted to fellow in 1935, and later served as vice-principal of the college. In 1940, during the Second World War, she temporarily left her post to work for the British government: she worked as a temporary assistant secretary for the Board of Trade and the Ministry of Production (created in 1942) before a posting between 1943 and 1945 in Washington, D.C., with the Combined Production and Resources Board, an inter-governmental agency regulating the economic resources of the United Kingdom, the United States and Canada. (Note: For Gray's title: "Gray, Dorothea Helen Forbes, 1905–1983 (classicist)". ArchiveSearch. University of Cambridge. For the dates and agencies, see The Antiquaries Journal 1984, p. 618. On the Combined Production and Resources Board, see Federal Records of World War II, vol. 1: Civilian Agencies, United States National Archives, 1950, p. 1032) She was awarded the Order of the British Empire for her wartime work.

In 1947, Gray returned to St Hugh's, taking the post of University Lecturer in Homeric Archaeology. Among her students were G. E. M. Anscombe, who arrived at St Hugh's as Gray's tutee in 1937; Richard Hope Simpson, who studied under her for the diploma in classical archaeology in 1954–1955; and Mervyn Popham, who studied it in 1959–1960. In 1950–1951, she received a Woolley Travelling Fellowship, for which she worked on excavations at Smyrna in Asia Minor and Mycenae in Greece, (Note: On Gray's work at Smyrna, see Nicholls 1998, p. xxii.) where she excavated in the south-east extension of the Prehistoric cemetery. She was also part of both seasons of the excavations at Myrtou on Cyprus, under Joan du Plat Taylor, which ran between 1950 and 1951, (Note: Dikaios 1958, p. 255. On Gray's participation, see Taylor 1957, p. 1.) and on the Aegean island of Chios: excavations there were conducted by the British School at Athens between 1952 and 1955.

Gray was elected to the Society of Antiquaries of London on 2 May 1963. She retired in 1973, and died on 3 July 1983. Rachel Trickett, who was principal of St Hugh's at the time of Gray's death, recalled her as one whose students "knew that she would hide their delinquencies, cover their shortcomings, scold and them and sympathise with them: and they knew that she was always on their side". John Boardman, in 1985, credited Gray with "[keeping] aloft the banner of Homeric archaeology", alongside Popham and Hilda Lorimer, at a time when pre-classical Greek archaeology was disfavoured by the university. In 2002, Maria Stamatopoulou and Marina Yeroulanou listed her, alongside Lorimer and their successors Susan Sherratt and Helen Brock, as part of the "exceptional contribution to the archaeology of early Greece" made by Somerville College, Oxford. In 2007, Robin Nisbet and Donald Russell wrote of her as "the patron goddess of Homeric archaeology". (Note: Quoted in West 1986, p. 228.)

== Published works ==
=== As author ===
- Gray, Dorothea (1955). "Houses in the Odyssey". The Classical Quarterly. 5 (1/2): 1–12. doi:10.1017/S000983880000241X. JSTOR 637290.
- — (1957). "The Sanctuary: Its Characteristics and Affinities". Myrtou-Pigadhes: A Late Bronze Age Sanctuary in Cyprus. Oxford: Ashmolean Museum. pp. 103–111. OCLC 859843009.
- — (1968) [1954]. "Homer and the Archaeologists". Fifty Years (and Twelve) of Classical Scholarship (2nd ed.). Oxford: Basil Blackwell. pp. 24–49. ISBN 0-631-10510-7.
- — (1974). Seewesen [Maritime Affairs] (in German). With a contribution by Spyridon Marinatos. Göttingen: Vandenhoeck & Ruprecht. pp. 141–165. ISBN 3-525-25406-7.

=== As editor ===
- Myres, John L. (1958). Gray, Dorothea (ed.). Homer and His Critics. London: Routledge and Kegan Paul. OCLC 337466. (Note: Edited by Gray, who contributed two additional chapters, after Myres's death at the request of his son, Nowell Myres.)

== Works cited ==
- Boardman, John (1985). "100 Year of Classical Archaeology at Oxford". In Kurtz, Donna (ed.). Beazley and Oxford: Lectures Deliveres in Wolfson College, Oxford, 28 June 1986. Oxford University Committee for Archaeology. pp. 43–56. ISBN 0-947816-10-0.
- Cadogan, Gerald (2003). "Mervyn Reddaway Popham: 1927–2000" (PDF). Proceedings of the British Academy. 120: 345–361.
- Davison, J. A. (1960). "Review: Homer and His Critics by John L. Myres, Dorothea Gray". The Classical Review. 10 (2): 108–110. doi:10.1017/S0009840X00170428. JSTOR 702927.
- Dikaios, P. (1958). "Review: Myrtou-Pigadhes: A Late Bronze Age Sanctuary in Cyprus, by Joan du Plat Taylor". The Antiquaries Journal. 38 (3–4): 255–256. doi:10.1017/S000358150008210X.
- Hood, Sinclair (1989). Foreword. Excavations in Chios: 1952–1955: Byzantine Emporio. By Ballance, Michael; Boardman, John; Corbett, Spencer; Hood, Sinclair. London and New York: Thames and Hudson. pp. vii–viii. ISBN 0-500-96023-2. JSTOR 40856008.
- Hope Simpson, Richard (2014). Mycenaean Messenia and the Kingdom of Pylos. Philadelphia: INSTAP Academic Press. ISBN 978-1-931534-75-8.
- Mac Cumhaill, Clare; Wiseman, Rachael (2022). Metaphysical Animals: How Four Women Brought Philosophy Back to Life. New York: Penguin. ISBN 978-1-9848-9898-2.
- Nicholls, R. V. (1998). Introduction. Old Smyrna Excavations: The Temples of Athena. By Cook, J. M.; Nicholls, R. V. London: British School at Athens. pp. xix–xxvii. ISBN 0-904887-28-6. JSTOR 40856044.
- Nisbet, Robin; Russell, Donald (2007). "The Study of Classical Literature at Oxford, 1936–1988". In Stray, Christopher (ed.). Oxford Classics: Teaching and Learning 1800–2000. London: Bloomsbury Academic. pp. 219–238. ISBN 978-1-4725-3782-9.
- Parker, Laetitia (2016). "A. M. Dale". In Wyles, Rosie; Hall, Edith (eds.). Women Classical Scholars: Unsealing the Fountain from the Renaissance to Jacqueline de Romilly. Oxford University Press. pp. 335–344. ISBN 978-0-19-179257-1.
- "Proceedings and Obituaries". The Antiquaries Journal. 64 (2): 610–623. 1984. doi:10.1017/S0003581500081439.
- Stamatopoulou, Maria; Yeroulanou, Marina (2002). Excavating Classical Culture: Recent Archaeological Discoveries in Greece. Oxford: Archaeopress. ISBN 1-903767-03-2.
- Taylor, Joan du Plat (1957). "Introduction". In Taylor, Joan du Plat (ed.). Myrtou-Pigadhes: A Late Bronze Age Sanctuary in Cyprus. Oxford: Ashmolean Museum. OCLC 859843009.
- West, Priscilla (1986). "Reminisces of Seven Decades". In Griffin, Penny (ed.). St Hugh's: One Hundred Years of Women's Education in Oxford. Houndmills and London: MacMillan. ISBN 1349077275.
