= Hugh Sackett =

Archeologist

Leyland Hugh Sackett FSA (13 August 1928 – 12 April 2020) was an archeologist credited with being among the discoverers of the Palaikastro Kouros.

== Education ==
Sackett attended Merton College at Oxford.

== Work ==
As an archeologist, Sackett co-directed excavations at Lefkandi (Mervyn Popham was the other co-director) and worked at Minoan Palaikastro and Roman Knossos in Crete. His work at Lefkandi took place from 1962 to 1963 and 1964–1990, investigating Iron Age Greece. His excavation work at Palaikastro took place from 1962 to 1963 and 1983–2020.

Additional work included excavations at Chios, Knossos, and Attica.

His association with the British School at Athens began in 1954. Sackett was assistant director of the school from 1961 to 1963 and later became a vice-president there.

He taught classics and Greek archeology at the Groton School in Massachusetts for more than 60 years. He was Groton's longest-serving faculty member. Beginning in 1968 and until at least 2006, he was released from duties at Groton in the spring term in order to pursue his archeological work in Greece.

Sackett received the Gold Medal of the Archaeological Institute of America.

== Personal life ==
Sackett married his wife Eleanor in 1995. Sackett was the stepfather of Henry Davis, an attorney.
