= Mervyn Popham =

British archaeologist (1927–2000)

Mervyn Reddaway Popham, FBA, FSA (14 July 1927 – 24 October 2000) was a British archaeologist and prehistorian.

== Early life and education ==
Born in Exeter, Popham was educated at the John Stacker School, Exeter and Exeter School. After National Service in the Royal Navy (1946–1948), he proceeded to the University of St Andrews (1948–1952), he studied classics and he became interested in epigraphy. One of his professors was Terence Mitford.

== Colonial Service in Cyprus ==
In 1952 he went to Cyprus where he worked as a photographer under the archaeologist Terence Mitford in his excavation at Kouklia.

Joining the Colonial Administrative Service in 1951, Popham served in Cyprus from 1953 to 1959, an experience which marked him. Beginning as assistant district commissioner for Nicosia, he then worked in the Secretariat in Nicosia, where he served during the initial stages of the Cyprus Emergency. He then served as district commissioner for the Troodos area, where many EOKA insurgents were hidden.

During his time in Cyprus, Popham continued to read and write about classical archaeology. Despite being urged by Sir Hugh Foot to remain in the Colonial Service and being offered a position as secretary to the Governor of Malta, Popham chose to resign from the Service in 1959 to return to archaeology. He completed a Diploma in Classical Archaeology at the University of Oxford. Among his professors were John Boardman, Dorothea Gray and David Lewis.

== Archaeological career ==
In 1961 he joined Sinclair Hood and his team at Knossos. In 1962 with Hugh Sackett he excavated at Palaikastro and in 1964 at Lefkandi-Xeropolis.

In the 1960's he worked as Assistant Director of the British School at Athens. His work contributed significantly to the study of Cypriot White Slip Ware.

In 1960 he was elected a Fellow of the Society of Antiquaries, and in 1988 a Fellow of the British Academy.

== Publications ==
- Popham, M. R. (1963). The Proto White Slip Pottery of Cyprus, in P. Åström and G. R. H. Wright, Two Bronze Age Tombs at Dhenia in Cyprus, Opuscula Atheniensia, 4, 277–297.
- Popham, M. (1963). Two Cypriot Sherds from Crete. The Annual of the British School at Athens, 58, 89–93.
- Popham, M. R. (1965). Some Late Minoan III Pottery from Crete. The Annual of the British School at Athens, 60, 316–342. doi:10.1017/S006824540001399X
- Popham, M. (1967). Late Minoan Pottery, A Summary. The Annual of the British School at Athens, 62, 337–351. doi:10.1017/S0068245400014209
- Popham, M. R. (1972). White Slip Ware. In: Åström, P. (ed.) The Swedish Cyprus Expedition, IV. IC, Lund: The Swedish Cyprus Expedition, 431–471.
- Popham, M. R. (1972). A Note on the Relative Chronology of White Slip Ware. In: Åström, P. (ed.) Swedish Cyprus Expedition IV: ID, Lund: The Swedish Cyprus Expedition, 699–705.
- Popham M, Touloupa E, Sackett LH. (1982). The hero of Lefkandi. Antiquity, 56, 169–174. doi:10.1017/S0003598X00054648
- Popham, M. R., Touloupa, E., & Sackett, L. H. (1982). Further Excavation of the Toumba Cemetery at Lefkandi, 1981. The Annual of the British School at Athens, 77, 213–248. doi:10.1017/S006824540000513X
- Popham M. (1984). Rantidi 1910 and 1955, in T. B. Mitford and O. Masson, The Syllabic Inscriptions of Rantidi-Paphos. Ausgrabungen in Alt-Paphos auf Cypern, 2, Konstanz: Universitätsverlag Konstanz, 3–11.
- Popham, M. R. and Lemos, I.S. (1995). A Euboean Warrior Trader. Oxford Journal Of Archaeology, 14: 151–157. Https://Doi.Org/10.1111/J.1468-0092.1995.Tb00391.X
- Popham, M. R. (2001). Problems Encountered in the Preparation of the Section on White Slip Ware for SCE IV. In: Karageorghis, V. (ed.) The White Slip Ware of Late Bronze Age Cyprus. Wien, 45–47.
