= James C. Wright =

Classical archaeologist

James C. Wright is an American classical archaeologist and academic who specialises in the Aegean civilizations and Ancient Greece. Since 1998, he has been a professor in the Department of Classical and Near Eastern Archaeology of Bryn Mawr College. From July 2012 to July 2017, he additionally served as Director of the American School of Classical Studies at Athens.

== Selected works ==
- Wright, James C., ed. (2004). The Mycenaean feast. Athens: American School of Classical Studies at Athens. ISBN 9780876619513.
