= Reynold Higgins =

English archaeologist (1916–1993)

Reynold Alleyne Higgins (born 26 November 1916 in Weybridge, Surrey; died 18 April 1993 in Dunsfold, Surrey) was a British classical archaeologist. He worked at the Department of Greek and Roman Antiquities at the British Museum from 1947 to 1977, finishing his career as Acting Keeper. He was also Chairman of the Managing Committee of the British School at Athens from 1975 to 1979. He was elected a Fellow of the British Academy in 1972.

He was educated at Sherborne School and Pembroke College, Cambridge.

== Books ==
- Greek and Roman Jewellery. London, Methuen 1961; Second edition 1980, ISBN 0-416-71210-X
- Greek terracotta figures. London, British Museum 1969, ISBN 0-7141-1215-1
- The Greek Bronze Age. London, British Museum 1970, ISBN 0-7141-1233-X
- The Archaeology of Minoan Crete. London, The Bodley Head 1973, ISBN 0-370-01575-4
- Jewellery from classical lands . London, British Museum 1976, ISBN 0-7141-1216-X
- The Aegina treasure: an archaeological mystery. London, British Museum 1979, ISBN 0-7141-8006-8
- Tanagra and the figurines. London, Trefoil books 1986, ISBN 0-86294-085-0
- Minoan and Mycenaean Art. New rev. ed., London, Thames & Hudson 1997, ISBN 0-500-20303-2

With Michael Higgins

- A Geological Companion to Greece and the Aegean. London, Duckworth/ Cornell Univ Press 1996, ISBN 0-8014-3337-1
