= Eritha =

Mycenaean priestess (fl. c. 1180 BCE)

- 𐀁𐀪𐀲
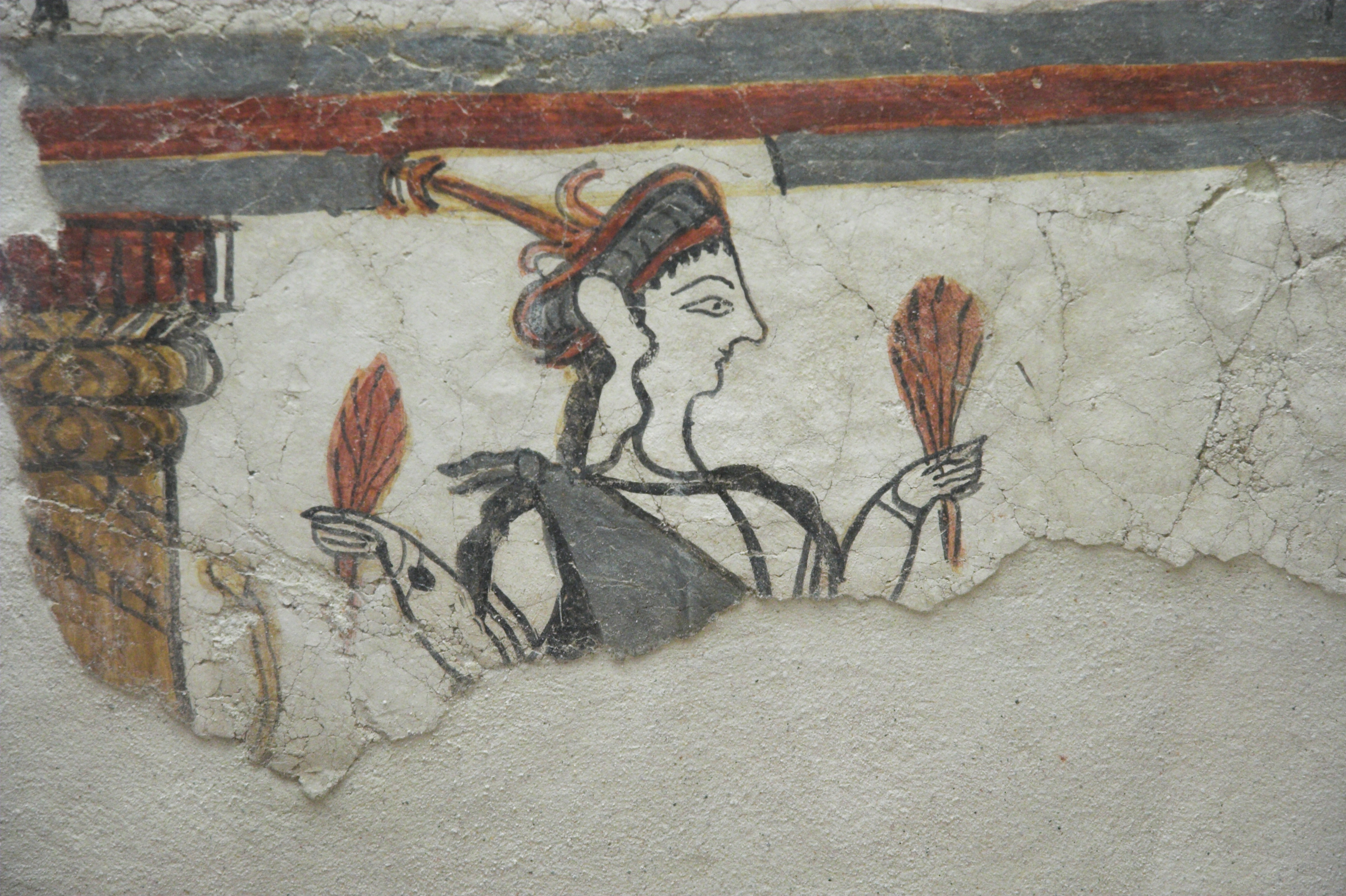
- Fresco from Mycenae probably depicting a goddess or priestess, c. 1250 – c. 1180 BCE
- Occupation: Priestess
- Years active: c. 1180 BCE
- Known for: Dispute with the damos over the status of her landholdings

Eritha (Note: Classical Latin pronunciation: [ˈɛrɪtʰa]; Mycenaean Greek: 𐀁𐀪𐀲, syllabic transcription e-ri-ta. (Note: Although Linear B was used to write Mycenaean Greek, it uses a restricted range of syllabograms, ideograms and numerals to do so: scribes writing in Linear B therefore employed a complex system of rules in converting the sounds of the language to Linear B syllabograms. See Judson 2020, pp. 12–20.)) (fl. c. 1180 BCE) was a Mycenaean priestess. She was a subject of the Mycenaean state of Pylos, in the southwestern Peloponnese, based at the cult site of Sphagianes. Sphagianes is believed to have been near the palatial centre of Pylos, and may have been located at modern Volimidia.

As a priestess, Eritha held an elevated position in Pylian society. She is the more prominent of the two priestesses known from Pylos, and held economic independence and social prominence unusual for women in the Pylian state. She held authority over several other people, including at least fourteen women who were probably assigned to her by the palatial state as servants to assist with the distribution of religious offerings.

In the last year before the destruction of the palace at Pylos (c. 1180 BCE), Eritha was involved in a legal dispute over the status of her lands against the local damos which represented the other landholders of Sphagianes. While the exact nature of the dispute is unclear, Eritha seems to have claimed that part of her land was held on behalf of her deity, and therefore subject to reduced taxes or obligations. The outcome of the dispute is unknown.

The record of Eritha's land dispute constitutes the longest preserved sentence of Mycenaean Greek and the oldest evidence of a legal dispute from Europe. It has been used as evidence for the status of women in the Mycenaean world, as well as for relations between the palace, religious organisations and civic society, and for the legal systems and infrastructure that existed in the Pylian state.

== Position in society ==
By the time of Eritha's life at the end of the Bronze Age, Mycenaean states, such as Pylos in the southwestern Peloponnese, were centred on monumental buildings, known in modern scholarship as palaces. These palaces were themselves the centre of economic and political administration, and formed institutions which mobilised and redistributed resources within the polity. The most prominent individual within that polity was the king, or wanax, who exercised political authority, held a prominent religious role, and controlled large amounts of land, workers and resources. (Note: Schofield 2007, pp. 116–117. On the precise role of the wanax and the uncertainties around it, see Palaima 1995, particularly pp. 120–123.) Administrators within the palatial apparatus kept records of economic and other activity on clay tablets, written in the Linear B script.

The southwestern Peloponnese c. 1180 BCE, showing possible locations of some key sites within the Pylian state

In the Linear B records, Eritha is associated with the site of Sphagianes (Mycenaean Greek: 𐀞𐀑𐀊𐀚, syllabic transcription pa-ki-ja-ne). Sphagianes is known through the tablets categorised by modern scholars into the Eb, Ep, En and Eo series, which record landholdings at the site. It is believed to have been a religious centre near Pylos, (Note: Barbara Montecchi has also suggested that Sphagianes may have been the name of a district, perhaps including the settlement of Pylos itself, or of all or part of that settlement.) and may have shared a location with the large cemetery at Volimidia, around 4 kilometres (2.5 mi) northeast of the palace at Pylos. (Note: Chadwick 1972, p. 109; Lupack 2024, p. 227 (on the possible identification of Volimidia and Sphagianes); Vlachopoulos 2021, p. 231 (on the location of Volimidia).) Most of the landholders at Sphagianes, including Eritha, are described with titles associated with religious cult, particularly forty-six people labelled as "servants of the god". (Note: Hiller 2011, p. 182: for the number and for specific detail, see Lupack 2011, p. 208.) The site was dedicated to the goddess Potnia, who may have been a mother goddess and was possibly the chief goddess of the Pylian pantheon.

Those identified by name in the Pylian tablets, such as Eritha, constitute around 2 per cent of the estimated population of the polity. Dimitri Nakassis has argued that they represent "a broad elite group" within it. Eritha is one of two women named as holding religious office, along with another named Karpathia. Both were based at Sphagianes; Eritha appears to have been the more important of the two. (Note: Olsen 2014, p. 136: "...of the named priestesses, e-ri-ta, whose name should normalize as Eritha, seems to have been the more significant.") Guy Middleton has argued that Eritha may have been a member of an aristocratic or royal family, but equally may have owed her authority to a religious system with little direct correspondence to the ruling palatial system. Religious organisations in the Pylian state were involved in economic activities, particularly the manufacture of bronze, and had at least some economic independence from the palatial authority.

Priestesses held positions of power in Mycenaean society, and religion is one of few spheres in which women are shown as holding authority in Mycenaean art. They received economic and administrative privileges, and carried out civic functions as well as religious ones, such as animal sacrifice. Of all the women listed on the Pylian Linear B tablets, Eritha and Karpathia controlled the largest amount of material goods. Barbara Olsen has described them as the most important women mentioned in the records of either Pylos or the site of Knossos on Crete. (Note: Of approximately 5,500 surviving Linear B tablets, around 4,000 are from Knossos and 1,000 are from Pylos: the next largest corpus, of around 400 tablets, is from Thebes.) Priestesses are shown as having control over land, men, women and material goods, including textiles. Olsen notes that the religious sphere is an exception to the usually male-dominated nature of Pylian society, writing that "only the institution of religion could trump gender", (Note: Olsen 2014, p. 154: see also Olsen 2020, p. 294: "the Linear B tablets from both Pylos and Knossos reveal a hierarchical social system in which men predominate.") (Note: A conjectural reading by Jorrit Kelder and Marco Poelwijk of another Linear B tablet, PY Ta 711, has speculated that the name written in Linear B as pu_{2}-ke-qi-ri, usually identified as that of a male palatial official, may have belonged to a noble woman or queen.) and that the religion appears to have been the only mechanism for women to obtain economic autonomy. At Pylos, it is rare to find evidence of women having control over land or being involved in economic activities monitored by the palace, though women were more prominent in both areas at Knossos. Only 5 per cent of the land recorded on the Pylian Linear B tablets was held by women, and no women without religious offices are recorded as landholders. Cult officials are also the only women, bar one, to be listed without reference to their marital or child-bearing status. (Note: Olsen 2015, p. 118. The exception, a woman named Kessandra, is listed on five Linear B tablets as being allotted men, commodities and food by the palace.)

Another woman at Sphagianes, by the name of Huamia, is listed on the tablet PY Ep 704 as a "servant of the god" and as holding land given to her as a "gift of honour" by a priestess. Nakassis infers that this priestess is likely to be Eritha, who is named on the following line of the same tablet. Joan Breton Connelly has suggested that those designated as servants of the god had the role of assisting Eritha in her duties. While the specific nature of these priestly duties is not recorded by the palace, Eritha is the only woman listed as holding power over those designated as "slaves" or "servants". (Note: The Mycenaean Greek term doulos is variously rendered as both slave and servant: Nakassis suggests that the latter more closely fits the available evidence, while Hiller writes that they are "surely not 'slaves' in the classical sense of the word".) The tablet PY Ae 303 lists at least fourteen women, designated as "servants of the priestess", possibly assigned to Eritha by the palace to help with the distribution of gold as religious offerings.

== Land dispute ==
A drawing of the tablet PY Ep 704, on which Eritha's land dispute is recorded. Eritha's name can be read at the beginning of the third and fifth lines.

A dispute over Eritha's land is recorded on two Linear B tablets. The first, PY Eb 297, is described by Nakassis and by Thomas Palaima as a "preliminary document", and was written by a high-ranking administrator known as Hand 41. (Note: Nakassis 2013, p. 171; Palaima 2000, p. 9. For Hand 41's status, see Palaima 1985, p. 105.) The second, PY Ep 704, was written by Hand 1, considered the chief scribe of Pylos; Palaima calls this the "final recension" of the matter. The tablets represent the oldest known evidence of a legal dispute from Europe.

PY Ep 704 records Eritha's landholdings in the following lines. These constitute the longest preserved sentence of Mycenaean Greek, and the only record of a judicial dispute in the Linear B corpus:

Eritha the priestess holds an onaton plot of communal land from the damos, so much seed: WHEAT: 38.4 litres ... Eritha the priestess holds and claims to hold an etōnion plot for the god, but the damos says she holds an onaton plot of communal lands, so much seed: WHEAT 374.4 litres. (Note: The size of a plot of land was expressed in terms of the amount of seed required to sow it. Michael Lane estimates that between 52 and 86 litres of seed would be sown per hectare, making the smaller plot between 0.45 and 0.74 hectares (1.1 and 1.8 acres) in area and the larger between 4.35 and 7.2 hectares (10.7 and 17.8 acres).)

— PY Ep 704, lines 3, 5–6.

The word onaton referred to a standard allotment of land. The land in dispute – the second allotment mentioned in the tablet – is described by Nakassis as fairly large by Pylian standards. The term etōnion described a category of landholding: its precise meaning is unclear. (Note: Nakassis 2013, p. 171. See § Nature of the dispute below.) The palace appears to have made no decision to settle the dispute.

=== Date ===
Linear B tablets were written on clay and retained for at most a year. Their contents may, in normal circumstances, have been transferred to other materials such as papyrus for long-term storage. It is thought that the clay tablets would normally have been discarded after such a transfer was complete, and in any case that they were not generally intended to be archived or kept for an extended period: the site of Pylos is unusual in providing evidence for the systematic sorting and storage of these tablets.

Linear B tablets were not intentionally fired, but were left to dry in the sun. Those Linear B tablets which survive today were accidentally fired during the destruction by fire of the structure in which they happened to be. In the case of the palace at Pylos, this destruction happened late in the LH IIIB period, around the transition to LH IIIC, (Note: Periods of the Aegean Bronze Age are defined based on the material culture used in each one; the correspondence between these periods and absolute dates is debated. See Shelmerdine 2008, pp. 3–6.) and is dated to c. 1180 BCE. Most of the surviving tablets from Pylos were found in the so-called "Archives Complex" at the palace. Given that the tablets were normally retained for less than a year, Eritha's legal dispute must have taken place within months before the palace's destruction.

=== The damos ===
The term damos (plural damoi) in Linear B is used for quasi-independent village communities within the lands of the palatial state. John Bennet and Cynthia Shelmerdine suggest that the word damos referred to an administrative district, and also to the group of local administrators overseeing land allocations in that district. The local damos, rather than the palace, is generally taken to have controlled all the land at Sphagianes recorded on the Linear B tablets, and therefore to have been able to call upon the service of its land-holding supervisors, known as telestai. (Note: Lupack 2011, p. 213; Deger-Jalkotzy 1983, pp. 91, 99–100. On the telestai, see Nakassis 2013, p. 12, and Chadwick 2014, p. 113.) Land designated as "communal" was leased to individuals by the damos, and conferred obligations on the leaseholder with respect to the damos.

Rodney Castleden draws a contrast between priestesses like Eritha, whom he considers to have represented the social elite, and the damos, whom he considers to have been "ordinary people". The term "plot-holders" (ktoinohokhoi) was used by Hand 41 on PY Eb 297 to indicate Eritha's opponents, where damos was used by Hand 1 on PY Ep 704, leading to the suggestion that the landholders of Sphagianes either controlled the damos or were themselves equivalent to it. The names of twelve of these landholders are known: six are known to have been telestai, at least three were smiths, and one may have been a herdsman. Susan Lupack, Sigrid Deger-Jalkotzy and Michel Lejeune suggest that the "plot-holders" were a group or committee of damos members empowered to act on behalf of the wider damos. John Chadwick similarly considers that the largest landholders in the damos spoke on its behalf.

=== Nature of the dispute ===
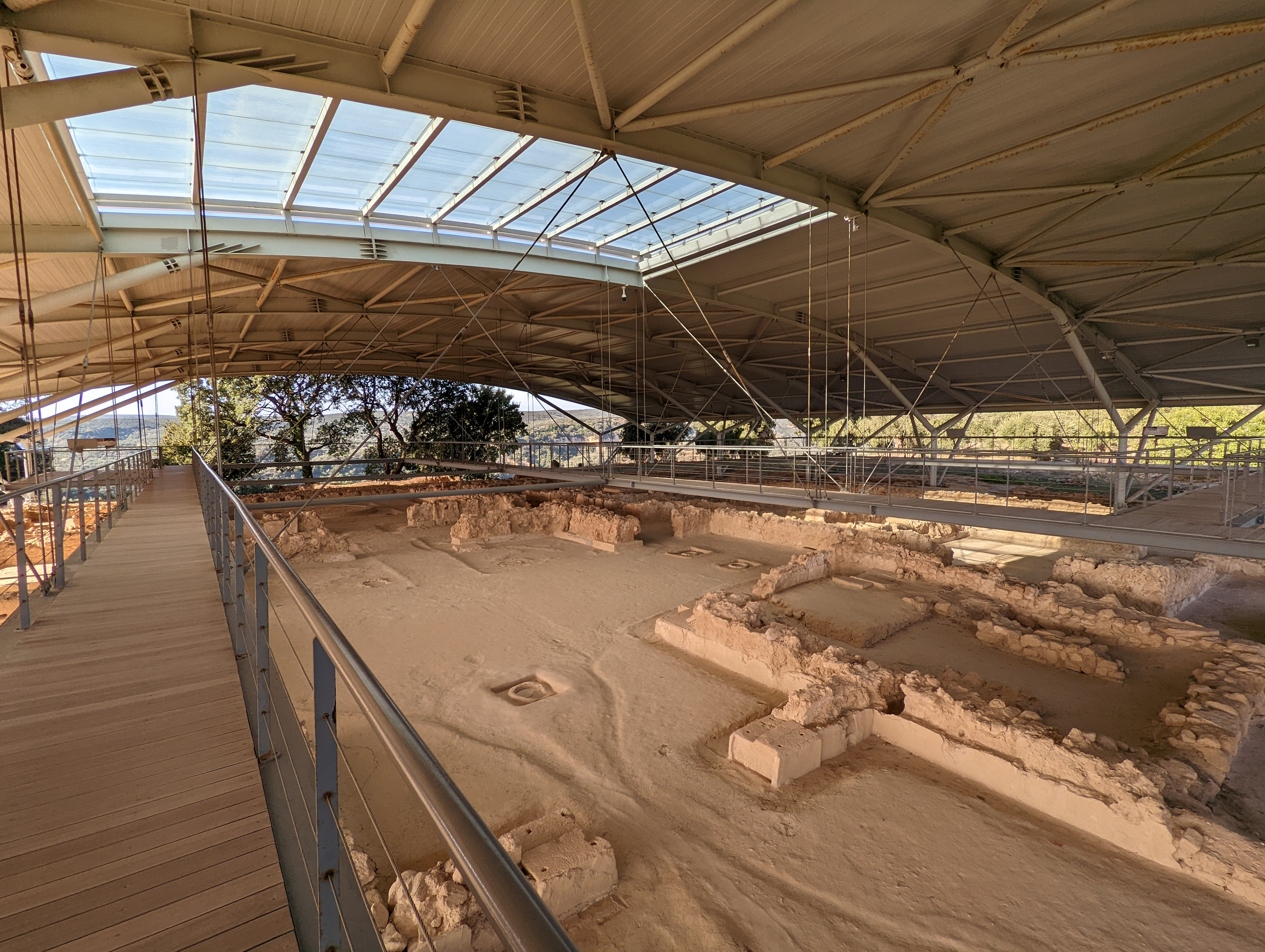
The remains of the palace at Pylos – the centre of the Pylian polity

As recorded on PY Ep 704, Eritha claimed that the disputed plot was an etōnion, a term whose precise meaning is obscure. It is generally agreed that an etōnion was exempt from at least some of the tax levied upon land. According to Bennet and Shelmerdine, the substance of the dispute was that Eritha argued that the majority of her holdings were exempt from regular administrative obligations on the grounds of having religious status. Lupack supports this view, suggesting that an etōnion was free of all obligations, including taxes. Nakassis suggests that an etōnion may have been required to pay no or fewer taxes to the damos than an onaton.

Michael Galaty suggests that, by categorising the land as being held "for the god", Eritha hoped to have it excluded from her property for the purposes of calculating tax obligations. Lupack suggests that categorising Eritha's holdings as an etōnion would mean that their production was still considered in calculating how much tax was owed to the palatial administration, but that their holder would not be liable to pay those taxes directly. She accepts Deger-Jalkotzy's belief that the damos as a whole was assessed and liable to pay taxes to the palace, and therefore that the other damos members would have to pay additional taxes, commensurate with the assessed value of Eritha's holdings, if the latter were categorised as exempt from taxation. Lupack suggests that the prospect of these additional requirements provoked the damos to object to Eritha's claim. Only three plots are listed as etōnion land in the Linear B tablets: Lupack suggests that these were gifts of the ruler (wanax), granted only rarely so as to avoid antagonising the damos.

=== Importance for Mycenaean studies ===
According to Nakassis, the dispute shows that religious institutions, such as the one with which Eritha was connected, were simultaneously involved with the palatial authority and at least partly independent of it. Bennet and Shelmerdine characterise the debate as a clash of "religious authority against the secular power of the damos". They argue that the tablet's inclusion in the palace archive of Pylos indicates that the palace ultimately had authority to adjudicate the dispute. At the same time, Nakassis judges that Eritha's claim to hold land "for the god" shows that her authority did not entirely derive from that of the palace.

Lupack writes that the existence of the dispute is "of great significance", in that it demonstrates that the damos was able to act as a unified legal entity, and that Eritha, as a priestess, was empowered to take legal action on behalf of her sanctuary and deity. Castleden suggests that the actions of the damos constitute a formal complaint by "ordinary people" against their social superiors, and so evidence that the hierarchy of Pylian society was "not overwhelmingly oppressive". Stefan Hiller, by contrast, considers Eritha to have been a member of the damos, and so the dispute to have been "not between palace and damos, but ... between an individual member of the damos and the damos community". Shelmerdine considers the damos to have held at least equal power to Eritha, and perhaps to have had the power to overrule her assessment of her land. She cites Eritha's dispute as an example of the "frictions" that could emerge between competing centres of religious, civic and royal power in Mycenaean society.

Deger-Jalkotzy suggests that the lack of a palatial decision in the dispute indicates that the palace saw such property disputes as a matter for the local community to resolve. Middleton similarly suggests that the palace may have lacked any power or authority to involve itself in the matter, though Shelmerdine and Bennet argue that the presence of the dispute in the palatial archive indicates that "land tenure was ultimately under the control of the king's central authority".

Philippa Steele has argued that the use in the Linear B tablets of verbs of speaking to describe the positions of Eritha and the damos indicates that legal business was conducted orally, rather than through written documentation, and its results recorded only in memory. Other scholars, such as Jean-Pierre Olivier, argue that legal documentation (such as records of laws, contracts and sales) was recorded on perishable materials, which are now lost. Palaima notes that the nature of Mycenaean land tenure and the obligations of taxation and service recorded in Linear B must have required judicial rulings and resolution, although no record of any has survived. Elsewhere, he calls his study of Eritha's case "a desperate attempt ... to find something in the Mycenaean texts to compare, even unfavorably, with the ... great Hittite codes and compilations of law, law cases, and legal precedents".

== See also ==
- Mycenaean religion

== Bibliography ==
- Bennet, John (2001). "Agency and Bureaucracy: Thoughts on the Nature and Extent of Administration at Bronze-Age Pylos". In Voutsaki, Sofia; Killen, John (eds.). Economy and Politics in the Mycenaean Palatial States. Cambridge Philological Society. pp. 25–37. ISBN 978-0-906014-26-4.
- Bennet, John; Shelmerdine, Cynthia W. (2008). "Economy and Administration". In Shelmerdine, Cynthia W. (ed.). The Cambridge Companion to the Aegean Bronze Age. Cambridge University Press. pp. 289–309. doi:10.1017/CCOL9780521814447. ISBN 978-1-139-00189-2.
- Bennet, John (2013). "Bronze Age Greece". In Bang, Peter Fibiger; Scheidel, Walter (eds.). The Oxford Handbook of the State in the Ancient Near East and Mediterranean. New York: Oxford University Press. pp. 235–258. ISBN 978-0-19-518831-8.
- Brecoulaki, Hariclia (2025). "Painting the Palace of Pylos: Aegean Legacies, Mycenaean Colors, and Iconographies". In Stocker, Sharon; Lyons, Claire L.; Davis, Jack L.; Militsi-Kechagia, Evangelia (eds.). The Kingdom of Pylos: Warrior-Princes of Mycenaean Greece. Los Angeles: J. Paul Getty Museum. pp. 151–154. ISBN 978-1-60606-967-7.
- Castleden, Rodney (2005). The Mycenaeans. London and New York: Routledge. ISBN 0-415-36336-5.
- Chadwick, John (1957). "Potnia". Minos: Revista de Filología Egea [Minos: Review of Aegean Philology]. 5: 117–129. ISSN 0544-3733.
- Chadwick, John (1972). "The Mycenaean Documents". In McDonald, William; Rapp, George (eds.). The Minnesota Messenia Expedition: Reconstructing a Bronze Age Regional Environment. Minneapolis: University of Minnesota Press. pp. 100–116. ISBN 0-8166-0636-6.
- Chadwick, John (1976). The Mycenaean World. Cambridge University Press. ISBN 0-521-29037-6.
- Chadwick, John (2014) [1967]. The Decipherment of Linear B (2nd ed.). Cambridge University Press. ISBN 978-1-107-69176-6.
- Connelly, Joan Breton (2007). Portrait of a Priestess: Women and Ritual in Ancient Greece. Princeton University Press. ISBN 978-0-691-12746-0.
- Deger-Jalkotzy, Sigrid (1978). E-qe-ta: Zur Rolle des Gefolgschaftswesens in der Sozialstruktur mykenischer Reiche [E-qe-ta: On the Role of Allegiance in the Social Structure of Mycenaean Kingdoms]. Mykenische Studien [Mycenaean Studies] (in German). Vol. 6. Vienna: Austrian Academy of Sciences. ISBN 978-3-7001-0271-7.
- Deger-Jalkotzy, Sigrid (1983). "Zum Charakter und zur Herausbildung der mykenischen Sozialstruktur" [On the Character and Development of Mycenaean Social Structure]. In Heubeck, A.; Neumann, G. (eds.). Res Mycenaeae: Akten des VII. Internationalen Mykenologischen Colloquiums in Nürnberg vom 6.–10. April 1981 [Res Mycenaeae: Acts of the 7th International Mycaenological Colloquium in Nürnberg from 6–10 April 1981] (in German). Göttingen: Vandenhoeck & Ruprecht. pp. 89–111. ISBN 3-525-25743-0.
- Deger-Jalkotzy, Sigrid (1988). "Landbesitz und Sozialstruktur im mykenischen Staat von Pylos" [Land Ownership and Social Structure in the Mycenaean State of Pylos]. In Heltzer, M.; Lipiński, E. (eds.). Society and Economy in the Eastern Mediterranean, c. 1500–1000 BC: Proceedings of the International Symposium Held at the University of Haifa from the 28th of April to the 2nd of May, 1985 (in German). Leuven: Peeters Publishers. pp. 31–52. ISBN 978-90-6831-135-8.
- Feuer, Bryan (2004) [1996]. Mycenaean Civilization: An Annotated Bibliography Through 2002 (Revised ed.). Jefferson: McFarland. ISBN 978-0-7864-1748-3.
- Finlayson, Sarah (2013). "Form Follows Function: Writing and Its Supports in the Aegean Bronze Age". In Piquette, Kathryn; Whitehouse, Ruth (eds.). Writing as Material Practice: Substance, Surface and Medium. London: Ubiquity Press. pp. 123–142. ISBN 978-1-909188-26-6.
- Galaty, Michael L. (2018). "Mycenaean Glocalism: Greek Political Economies and International Trade" (PDF). In Kristiansen, Kristian; Lindkvist, Thomas; Myrdal, Janken (eds.). Trade and Civilisation: Economic Networks and Cultural Ties, from Prehistory to the Early Modern Era. Cambridge University Press. ISBN 978-1-108-34094-6.
- Hiller, Stefan (1988). "Dependent Personnel in Mycenaean Texts". In Heltzer, M.; Lipiński, E. (eds.). Society and Economy in the Eastern Mediterranean, c. 1500–1000 BC: Proceedings of the International Symposium Held at the University of Haifa from the 28th of April to the 2nd of May, 1985. Leuven: Peeters Publishers. pp. 53–68. ISBN 978-90-6831-135-8.
- Hiller, Stefan (2011). "Mycenaean Religion and Cult" (PDF). In Duhoux, Yves; Morpurgo Davies, Anna (eds.). A Companion to Linear B: Mycenaean Greek Texts and Their World. Vol. 2. Louvain-la-Neuve: Peeters. pp. 169–211. ISBN 978-90-429-2932-6.
- Judson, Anna P. (2020). The Undeciphered Signs of Linear B: Interpretation and Scribal Practices. Cambridge University Press. doi:10.1017/9781108859745. ISBN 978-1-108-85974-5. Archived from the original on 3 March 2023.
- Kelder, Jorrit M.; Poelwijk, Marco (2016). "The Wanassa and the Damokoro: A New Interpretation of a Linear B Text from Pylos". Greek, Roman and Byzantine Studies. 56 (4): 572–584. ISSN 2159-3159.
- Lane, Michael Franklin (2009). "From da-mo to δήμος: Survival of a Myceneaean Land Allocation Tradition in the Classical Period". In Bachhuber, Christian; Roberts, R. Gareth (eds.). Forces of Transformation: The End of the Bronze Age in the Mediterranean. Proceedings of an International Symposium Held at St. John's College, University of Oxford, 25–6 March 2006. Themes from the Ancient Near East. Vol. 1. Oxford: Oxbow Books. pp. 111–118. ISBN 978-1-84217-503-3.
- Lupack, Susan (2008). The Role of the Religious Sector in the Economy of Late Bronze Age Greece. BAR International Series. Vol. 1858. Oxford: Archaeopress. ISBN 978-1-4073-0341-3 – via ResearchGate.
- Lupack, Susan (2011). "Redistribution in Aegean Palatial Societies. A View from Outside the Palace". American Journal of Archaeology. 115 (2): 207–217. doi:10.3764/aja.115.2.0207. ISSN 0002-9114. JSTOR 10.3764/aja.115.2.0207. Archived from the original on 5 September 2015.
- Lupack, Susan (2024). "How Elitist Were Typical Mycenaean Communities? Investigating Relative Status in Mycenaean Damoi Through the Landholders of the Pylos Ep and Ea Series". Oxford Journal of Archaeology. 43 (3): 226–236. doi:10.1111/ojoa.12302. ISSN 1468-0092.
- Middleton, Guy D. (2023). Women in the Ancient Mediterranean World: From the Palaeolithic to the Byzantines. Cambridge University Press. doi:10.1017/9781108646529.014. ISBN 978-1-108-64652-9.
- Montecchi, Barbara (2016). "Pu-ro, pa-ki-ja-na/ne, and the Sanctuary of Poseidon at Pylos". Studi Micenei ed Ego-Anatolici. 2: 119–136. ISSN 1126-6651 – via Academia.edu.
- Mountjoy, Penelope Ann (1997). "The Destruction of the Palace at Pylos Reconsidered". The Annual of the British School at Athens. 92: 109–137. doi:10.1017/S0068245400016658. ISSN 2045-2403. JSTOR 30103480. S2CID 161404282.
- Nakassis, Dimitri (2013). Individuals and Society in Mycenaean Pylos. Leiden: Brill. ISBN 978-90-04-25146-5.
- Nakassis, Dimitri (2015). "Women in Mycenaean Greece: The Linear B Tablets from Pylos and Knossos (Review)". Bryn Mawr Classical Review.
- Nikolaidou, Marianna (2012). "Looking for Minoan and Mycenaean Women: Paths of Feminist Scholarship Towards the Aegean Bronze Age". In James, Sharon L.; Dillon, Sheila (eds.). A Companion to Women in the Ancient World. Hoboken: Wiley. pp. 38–53. doi:10.1002/9781444355024. ISBN 978-1-4051-9284-2.
- Nikoloudis, Stavroula (2014). "Working the Land: Ka-ma Plots at Pylos" (PDF). In Nakassis, Dimitri; Gulizio, Joann; James, Sarah A. (eds.). KE-RA-ME-JA: Studies Presented to Cynthia W. Shelmerdine. Philadelphia: INSTAP Academic Press. pp. 223–237. ISBN 978-1-931534-76-5.
- Olivier, Jean-Pierre (1986). "Cretan Writing in the Second Millennium BC". World Archaeology. 17 (3): 377–389. doi:10.1080/00438243.1986.9979977. hdl:2013/ULB-DIPOT:oai:dipot.ulb.ac.be:2013/248436. ISSN 1470-1375.
- Olsen, Barbara A. (2014). Women in Mycenaean Greece: The Linear B Tablets from Pylos and Knossos. Hoboken: Taylor and Francis. ISBN 978-1-317-74795-6.
- Olsen, Barbara A. (2015). "The Worlds of Penelope: Women in the Mycenaean and Homeric Economies". Arethusa. 48 (2): 107–113. doi:10.1353/are.2015.0007. ISSN 1080-6504. JSTOR 26314618.
- Olsen, Barbara A. (2020). "The People". In Kotsonas, Antonis; Lemos, Irene S. (eds.). A Companion to the Archaeology of Early Greece and the Mediterranean. Vol. 2. Hoboken: Wiley. pp. 293–316.
- Palaima, Thomas G. (1985). "Appendix" (PDF). Pylos: Palmprints and Palmleaves. By Sjöquist, Karl-Eric; Åström, Paul. Studies in Mediterranean Archaeology. Vol. 31. Göteborg: Paul Åström. pp. 99–107. ISBN 91-86098-22-5.
- Palaima, Thomas G. (1995). "The Nature of the Mycenaean Wanax: Non-Indo-European Origins and Priestly Functions" (PDF). In Rehak, Paul (ed.). The Role of the Ruler in the Prehistoric Aegean: Proceedings of a Panel Discussion Presented at the Annual Meeting of the Archaeological Institute of America, New Orleans, Louisiana, 28 December 1992, with Additions. Aegaeum. Vol. 11. University of Liège. pp. 119–139. ISBN 90-429-2411-X.
- Palaima, Thomas G. (2000). "Θέμις in the Mycenaean Lexicon and the Etymology of the Place-Name *ti-mi-to a-ko" (PDF). Faventia. 22 (1): 7–19. ISSN 0210-7570.
- Pluta, Kevin M. (1998). "A Reconstruction of the Archives Complex at Pylos: A Preliminary Report" (PDF). Minos. 31–32: 231–250. ISSN 0544-3733.
- Rutherford, Ian (2020). Hittite Texts and Greek Religion: Contact, Interaction, and Comparison. Oxford University Press. ISBN 978-0-19-959327-9.
- Salgarella, Ester (2020). "A Note on the Linear A & B Ideogram AB 131/VIN(um) 'Wine' and Its Variants: References to Time Notation?". Ktèma: Civilisations de l'Orient, de la Grèce et de Rome antiques. 45: 161–172. doi:10.3406/ktema.2020.2676. ISSN 2802-1401.
- Schofield, Louise (2007). The Mycenaeans. New York: J. Paul Getty Museum. ISBN 978-0-89236-867-9.
- Shelmerdine, Cynthia W. (1999). "Administration in the Mycenaean Palaces: Where's the Chief?". In Galaty, Michael L.; Parkinson, William A. (eds.). Rethinking Mycenaean Palaces: New Interpretations of an Old Idea. UCLA Monographs. Vol. 41. Los Angeles: Cotsen Institute of Archaeology. pp. 19–24. ISBN 0-917956-94-X.
- Shelmerdine, Cynthia (2008). "Introduction: Background, Methods and Sources". In Shelmerdine, Cynthia (ed.). The Cambridge Companion to the Aegean Bronze Age. Cambridge University Press. pp. 1–18. doi:10.1017/CCOL9780521814447.001. ISBN 978-1-139-00189-2.
- Shelmerdine, Cynthia W. (2023) [1988]. "The Palace and its Operation". In Davis, Jack L. (ed.). Sandy Pylos: An Archaeological History from Nestor to Navarino. Princeton: American School of Classical Studies at Athens. pp. 81–96. ISBN 978-1-62139-046-6.
- Steele, Philippa M. (2008). "A Comparative Look at Mycenaean and Near Eastern Bureaucracies: 'Bilateral' Documentation in the Linear B Archives?". Kadmos. 47 (1–2): 31–49. doi:10.1515/KADMOS.2008.003. ISSN 0022-7498.
- Vlachopoulos, Andreas (2021). "The Early Μycenaeans of Pylos: The Evidence from the Chamber Tomb Cemetery at Volimidia". In Eder, Birgitta; Zavadil, Michaela (eds.). (Social) Place and Space in Early Mycenaean Greece: International Discussions in Mycenaean Archaeology, October 5–8, 2016, Athens. Mykenische Studien. Vol. 35. Vienna: Austrian Academy of Sciences Press. pp. 231–272. ISBN 978-3-7001-8854-4 – via Academia.edu.
