= Volimidia =

Archaeological site in Greece

- Βολιμίδια (Greek)
- Location within Greece
- 37°3′29″N 21°43′25″E
- Type: Cemetery, with associated settlement; possible religious sanctuary
- Periods: Middle Helladic – Late Helladic III (with cult activity from Protogeometric to late antiquity)

Site notes
- Excavation dates: 1952–1965, 1972, 1990, 1991
- Archaeologists: Spyridon Marinatos; Theodora Karagiorga-Stathakopoulou; George S. Korres

Volimidia (Greek: Βολιμίδια) is an archaeological site in Messenia, in the Peloponnese region of Greece. During the Mycenaean period, from the end of the Middle Bronze Age (c. 1700 – c. 1600 BCE), it was used as a cemetery, and was the site of a settlement from the Late Helladic I period (c. 1600 – c. 1510 BCE) until the end of Late Helladic III in around 1180 BCE. (Note: Periods of the Aegean Bronze Age are defined based on the material culture used in each one; the correspondence between these periods and absolute dates is debated. See Shelmerdine 2008, pp. 3–6.) The Bronze Age cemetery consists of 35 tombs, mostly identified as chamber tombs. It may have been the site known in the Mycenaean period as Sphagianes, which was a religious centre in the territory of the Palace of Nestor at Pylos.

The chamber tombs at Volimidia are morphologically unusual, with rounded chambers and domed roofs rather than the more usual square and sloped constructions. It has been suggested that this may have been in imitation of the more monumental tholos tombs, which are unknown at Volimidia but began to be constructed elsewhere in ancient Messenia at around the same time. Burials were generally made in an extended position, with few grave goods except pottery vessels, though flint and obsidian arrowheads were also commonly deposited. From the Late Helladic II period (c. 1510 – c. 1400 BCE), practices of secondary burial became common, by which older, skeletonised bodies were disarticulated and their skulls grouped together.

In the Iron Age, the tombs at Volimidia became the focus of ritual activities known as "tomb cult", by which people re-opened the tombs to leave offerings, perform sacrifices, or inter additional burials. This practice intensified in the Hellenistic period (323–30 BCE), following Messenia's independence from Sparta in 369, and continued into the following Roman period. The area also appears to have been inhabited during this time, with a kiln and a bath-house constructed at the site.

Almost all of the tombs at Volimidia were excavated between 1952 and 1965 by Spyridon Marinatos, working for the Greek Archaeological Service in collaboration with the excavations of Carl Blegen at Pylos. Marinatos also made small-scale excavations in the Mycenaean settlement. Further tombs were excavated by Theodora Karagiorga-Stathakopoulou in 1972, by the Archaeological Service in 1990, and by George S. Korres in 1991.

== Site ==
The site of Volimidia is located about 800 metres (900 yd) north-northeast of the modern town of Chora in Messenia, in the southwest part of the Peloponnese region of Greece. It is approximately 4 kilometres (2.5 mi) northeast of the Palace of Nestor at Pylos, the centre of the Mycenaean polity of Messenia during the Late Bronze Age. Its name comes from the Greek word βουλιάζω (vouliazo; 'I sink') – a reference to the tendency of the ground to collapse because of the dug-out chambers of Mycenaean chamber tombs in the area. The site's excavator, Spyridon Marinatos, suggested that the large number of tombs might be explained by the soft, easily worked ground in the area. The site may also have functioned as a crossing of routes between the coast and the Aigaleon mountain range in central Messenia.

=== Late Bronze Age ===
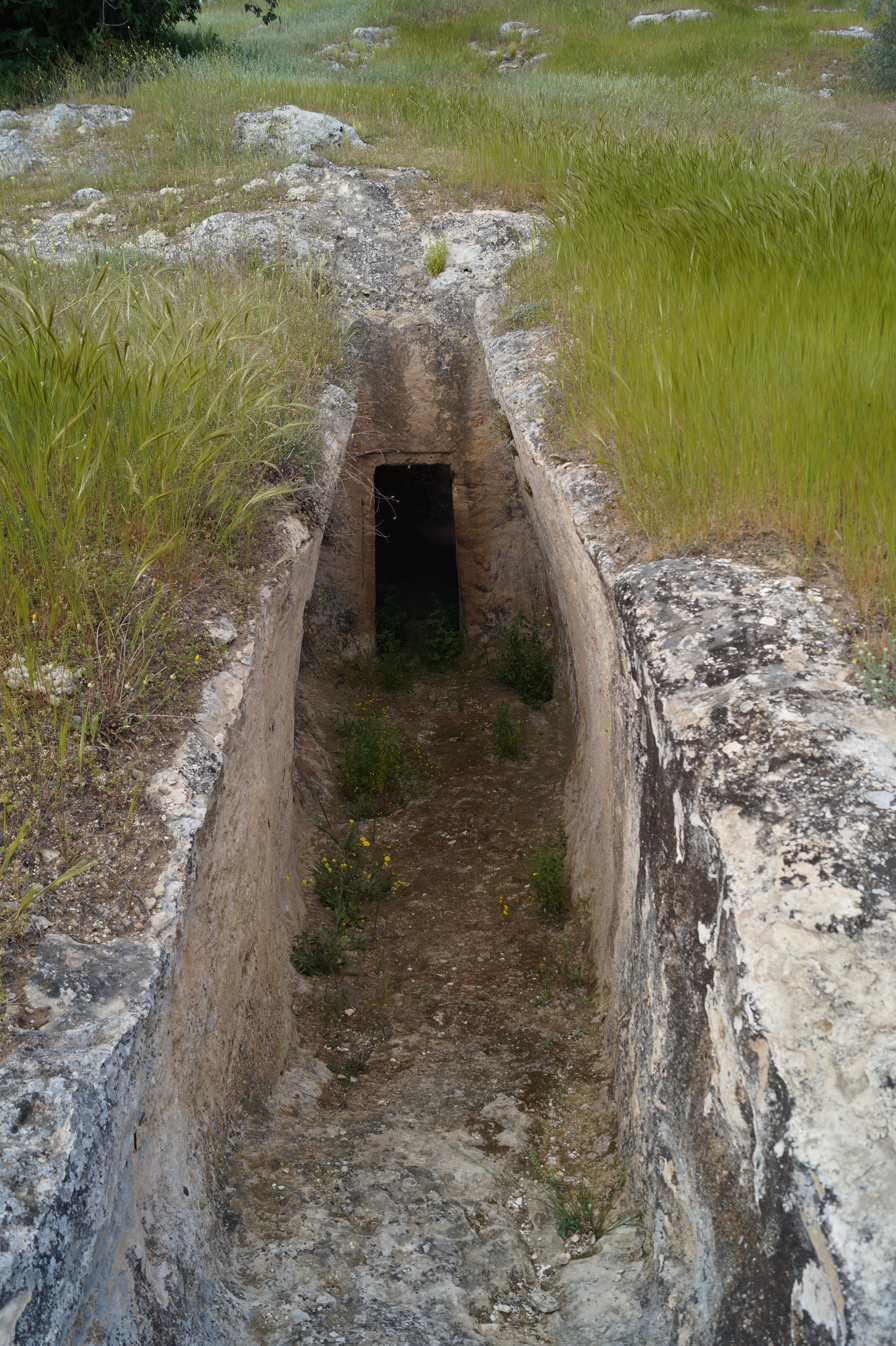
A chamber tomb at Aidonia in the Corinthia, looking down the dromos at the stomion

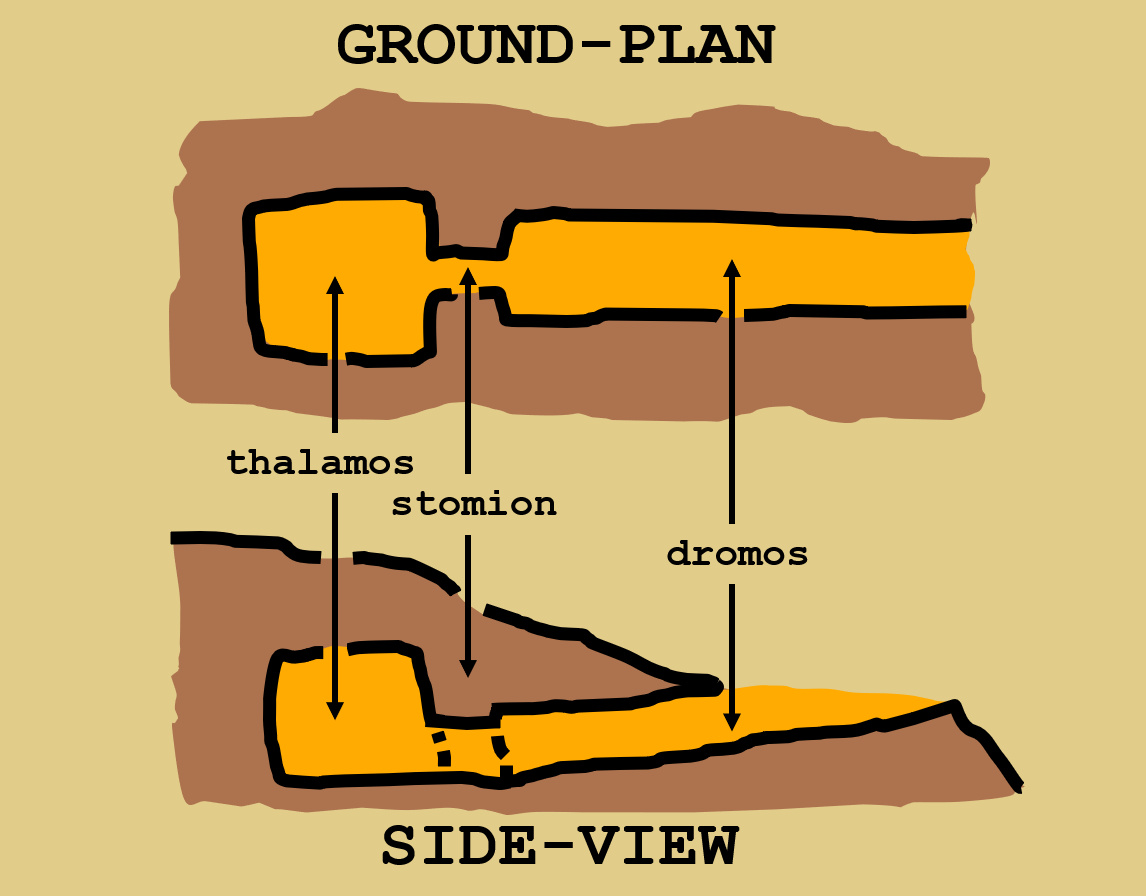
Schematic diagram of a typical chamber tomb, showing division into dromos, stomion and thalamos (chamber)

A total of 35 Late Bronze Age tombs are known at Volimidia; they are divided into five clustered groups, each about 100 metres (110 yd) apart. The clusters are mostly named after the owners of the properties on which they were found. (Note: The exception, Kephalovryso (literally meaning 'headwater', is the name of a part of the village that contains several springs.) The largest is the Angelopoulos cluster, with eleven tombs; the Tsoulea–Voria and Kefalovryso clusters have seven each, while the Koronios group has six and the Mastoraki plot one.

The earliest tomb at the site is numbered as Kefalovryso 1: the pottery in this tomb dates to the Middle Helladic III period (c. 1700 – c. 1600 BCE), and the grave is a rectangular pit similar in form to a shaft grave. It was cut into an existing natural cavity, and both larger and more richly filled with offerings than earlier known burials. It may originally have been covered with a burial-mound (tumulus). This tomb appears to have formed the nucleus of the earliest cemetery at the site; among the earliest chamber tombs are Kefalovryso 5 and 6, both immediately adjacent to it. Marinatos claimed to have identified other graves of a type intermediate between a pit and a shaft grave, dating to the Middle Helladic period (c. 2000 – c. 1600 BCE), at the site, though only Kefalovryso 1 could be excavated as the others lay beneath the modern road. (Note: Marinatos 1964, p. 79. For the absolute dates, see Shelmerdine 2008, p. 4.)

The remaining tombs are usually identified as chamber tombs, though they share some characteristics with the usually more monumentalised tholos tombs, which began to be constructed in Messenia at the end of the Middle Helladic period. These features include a rounded (rather than square) chamber and a domed (rather than sloped) roof; Carla Antonaccio suggests that the Volimidia tombs may more accurately be categorised as small tholos tombs. Spyros Iakovidis, who worked on Marinatos's excavations and drew the plans of the tombs, suggested that they were made in imitation of tholos tombs. Marinatos, in contrast, considered the Volimidia tombs to be the origin of the circular chamber shape, and to have predated the construction of tholos tombs. (Note: Tholos tombs are generally considered to have originated at the end of the Middle Helladic period, before the earliest known evidence for the use of chamber tombs at Volimidia.)

The earliest of the chamber tombs date to the Late Helladic I period (c. 1600 – c. 1510 BCE), while the latest date to Late Helladic III (c. 1400 – c. 1180 BCE), with signs of use until the end of that period. (Note: Hope Simpson 1982, p. 116; Korres 1993, p. 239; Antonaccio 1994, p. 95. For the absolute dates, see Shelmerdine 2008, p. 4, with Lolos 2023, p. 78.) The latest find from the cemetery is a jug dating to the Late Helladic IIIC period (c. 1180 BCE), contemporary with the destruction of the Palace of Nestor at Pylos. Nineteen of the tombs furnished finds from the Late Helladic I period: after the Kefalovryso cluster, the Koroniou cluster appears to have been the next established, followed by the Angelopoulos cluster and the Tsoulea–Voria cluster as the latest. Both the Koroniou and Angelopoulos clusters have a clear boundary from the earlier tombs, leading Andreas Vlachopoulos to suggest that they were established by a burying group distinct, perhaps in kinship, from those using the Kefalovryso tombs. The tombs were mostly oriented with their dromoi facing west, and were often constructed to align with those nearby.

Bodies in the cemetery were generally placed in an extended position, in common with later burials in tholos tombs but unlike the previous practice of burial inside large jars known as pithoi. Most of the tombs contained few grave goods; in particular, the burials tended not to include jewellery and furnished no bronze weapons, in contrast to elite tombs from elsewhere in the Mycenaean world. Several burials were accompanied by arrowheads made of flint or obsidian, pottery drinking vessels were common, and two tombs of the Angelopoulos cluster (6 and 8) contained sealstones. A stirrup jar found in the tomb numbered as Kefalovryso B is similar to those used in Minoan Crete, and may have been a Cretan import or a local product made in imitation of Cretan styles. Vlachopoulos suggests that the burying community was poor in wealth and relatively uninterested in using funerary ritual to display social status. During the Late Helladic II period, secondary funerary practices began to be used at the site, particularly the disarticulation of skeletonised remains and the placement of their skulls in collective groups. Claire Zavidil has characterised this as a shift from using burial as a means of expressing the socio-political identity of the deceased towards one which emphasised the connections between dead ancestors and the living, and as a sign of the growing importance of collectivism among the burying groups.

Tomb 9 of the Angelopoulos cluster

The tomb's dromos, facing the stomion, in 1958

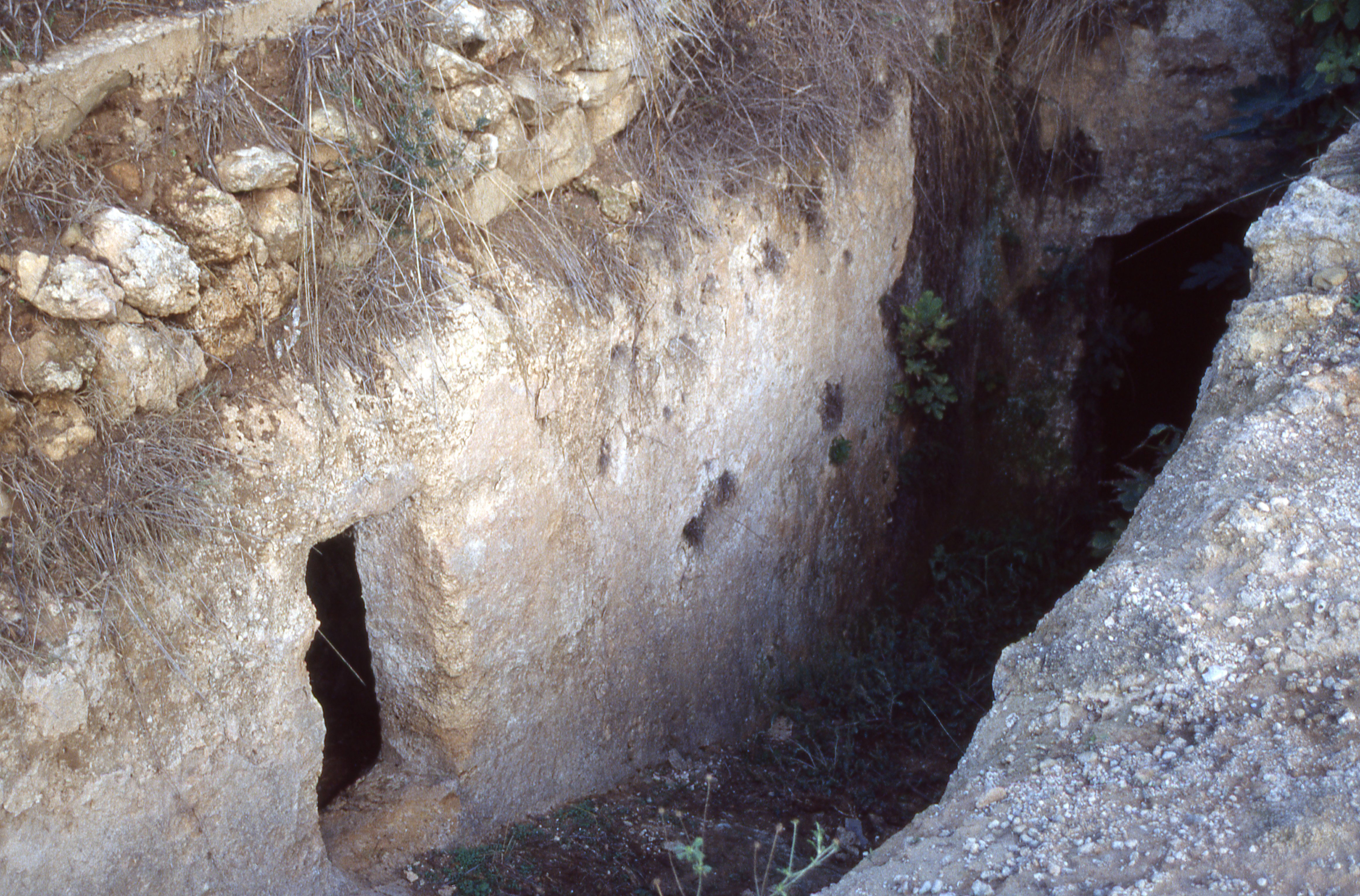
The side wall of the dromos in 1990, showing a secondary burial chamber

A Bronze Age settlement, occupied between the Late Helladic I and Late Helladic III, existed around 100 metres (110 yd) to the south of the cemetery. Michael Boyd, noting that the evidence for the use of the cemetery predates that for the existence of the settlement, suggests that the latter may have come into being because of the site's use for burials. Marinatos considered Volimidia to be the site of "Palaipylos", or the site known as Pylos in the Homeric poems: modern scholars consider this to be the Palace of Nestor at Ano Englianos. Nigel Spencer has suggested that the earlier tombs of Volimidia belonged to a local elite group distinct from that at Ano Englianos (and that the same was true of the contemporary tombs at Koryfasio, Voidokilia, Tragana, Koukounara and Myrsinochori, all large cemeteries in the broad vicinity of Pylos), which remained independent of Pylian authority until the Late Helladic IIIA period (c. 1400 – c. 1300 BCE). (Note: Spencer 1995, p. 286. Spencer credits the idea to Bennet 1995, though Bennet does not assert it for Volimidia. For the absolute date, see Shelmerdine 2008, p. 4.) John Bennet suggests that the lack of a tholos tomb at Volimidia, when tombs of this type began to be built at Pylos and other sites in the Late Helladic I, indicates that the site was already under Pylian control. He considers Volimidia likely to have been a second-order centre and a major site within the palatial state.

==== Possible identification with Sphagianes ====
At the end of the Late Bronze Age, Volimidia was in the territory controlled by the Mycenaean state based at the palatial centre of Pylos. Richard Hope Simpson posited in 1982 that it may have been a local administrative centre. John Chadwick suggested in 1972 that Volimidia may have been the site known in the Pylian Linear B records as Sphagianes. (Note: Mycenaean Greek: 𐀞𐀑𐀊𐀚, syllabic transcription pa-ki-ja-ne. Although Linear B was used to write Mycenaean Greek, it uses a restricted range of syllabograms, ideograms and numerals to do so: scribes writing in Linear B therefore employed a complex system of rules in converting the sounds of the language to Linear B syllabograms. See Judson 2020, pp. 12–20.) Sphagianes is believed to have been a religious centre near Pylos; most of the landholders there, including the priestess Eritha, are described with titles associated with religious cult, particularly forty-six people labelled as "servants of the god". (Note: Hiller 2011, p. 182: for the number and for specific detail, see Lupack 2011, p. 208.) The site was dedicated to the goddess Potnia, who may have been a mother goddess and was possibly the chief goddess of the Pylian pantheon. The hypothesis that Volimidia and Sphagianes are the same site was endorsed in 1999 by John Bennet and in 2014 by Richard Hope Simpson, (Note: Spyridon Marinatos, who excavated the tombs at Volimidia, thought the name Sphagianes most likely to refer to a site near the Bay of Navarino, since the island there known as Sphacteria was also known as Sphagia.) though Andreas Vlachopoulos wrote in 2021 that it was not universally accepted. Barbara Montecchi has suggested that Sphagianes may have been the name of a district, perhaps including the settlement of Pylos itself, or of all or part of that settlement.

=== Later periods ===
A burial was made in a pit grave a few metres south of the tomb numbered as Kefalovryso 1, at some point after the Mycenaean period: it contained a pottery kantharos vessel variously dated to the Submycenaean period (immediately following the Bronze Age) (Note: The absolute dates of the Submycenaean period are debated: proposals include c. 1125 – c. 1050 BCE, c. 1075 – c. 1050 BCE, and c. 1060 – c. 1000 BCE.) and the succeeding Early Iron Age. The tombs were used, as were other Mycenaean cemeteries in Messenia, for ritual activity and ancestor-worship, known as "tomb cult". A further six tombs in total contained pottery placed there in later periods: this assemblage consisted of one Protogeometric jug (c. 1025 – c. 900 BCE) and twenty-six vases from the Late Geometric period (c. 760 – c. 700 BCE). (Note: Coulson 1988, p. 53; Antonaccio 1994, pp. 96–100. For the dates of the Protogeometric, see Whitley 2003, p. 84. For the Late Geometric, see Papadopoulos 2017, p. 30.) This included at least ten Late Geometric vessels in Angelopoulos 4 and 10 or 11, probably of local manufacture, in Angelopoulos 5. Cultic activity may have continued during the period in which Messenia was ruled by Sparta (from the late eighth century until 369 BCE); (Note: For the dates, see Hall 2014, pp. 118, 184.) Susan E. Alcock has suggested that it could have formed a means of asserting and maintaining Messenian identity in this period.

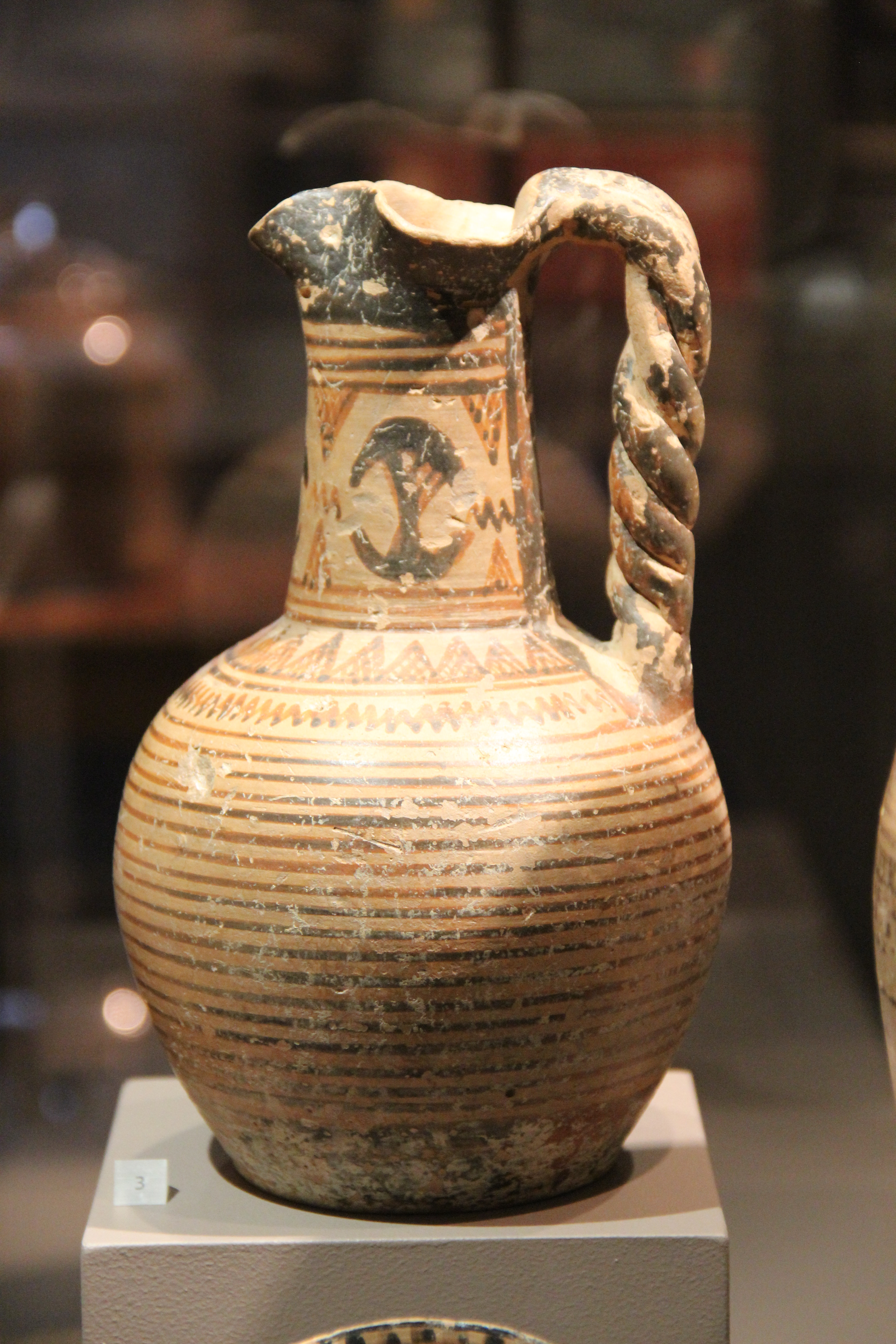
An Attic oinochoe of the Late Geometric period, displayed in the Museum of Cycladic Art, Athens

Evidence for tomb cult at Volimidia dramatically increases following Messenia's independence from Sparta. Alcock writes that Messenia has "pride of place" for the activity in post-classical Greece, furnishing a total of eight sites with clear evidence for it. (Note: Alcock 1991, p. 451. She lists the other seven as Kremmidia, Myrsinochori, Nichoria, Peristeria, Soulinari, Vathirema, and Voidokilia.) The Volimidia tombs were extensively reused in the ensuing Hellenistic and Roman periods (that is, from 323 BCE). A total of four funerary pyres were made in the tomb numbered as Angelopoulos 2 (two in the dromos and two in the burial chamber). One pyre in the dromos is dated to c. 300 BCE on the basis of associated cooking wares, while one in the chamber included a third-century BCE coin of Argos as well as evidence of a pig sacrifice. The latter pyre also showed extensive remains of pottery, metal, glass and other finds: Alcock determines these remains to be, at least in part, votive offerings. Also during the Hellenistic period, a further burial was made in the middle of the chamber of Angelopoulos 11. A group of five Hellenistic burials in pits were made around the tombs of the Angelopoulos cluster, some in the dromoi of the Mycenaean tombs, while Hellenistic burials were made in tombs 2 and 4 of the Kefalovryso cluster.

In the dromos of Angelopoulos 6, the largest tomb at Volimidia, another post-Mycenaean burial was made: Marinatos considered it to be Hellenistic in date. In the tomb's chamber, two burial pits were found, containing pottery of Mycenaean, Hellenistic and Roman date, as well as the bones of ox, deer, pigs and stags, all within two burial pits. Marinatos interpreted these pits as Mycenaean burials with later votive offerings, while Alcock suggests that the burials themselves may have been Hellenistic, and George Korres interprets most of the material remains as dumped refuse. In the Roman period, tile graves were made in the tomb numbered as Voria–Tsoulea 2. Roman pottery, including material from the imperial and early Christian eras, was found in Angelopoulos 4. Alcock describes the reuse of the tombs at Volimidia as "without doubt the longest and among the most complicated [example of its kind] in Greece".

There is believed to have been a Hellenistic and Roman settlement in the vicinity of Volimidia. As well as the tile graves, Roman and Hellenistic constructions at the site included a kiln and a bath-house. Surface finds of Roman potsherds are extremely common at the site.

== Archaeological study ==
Spyridon Marinatos, an ephor of the Greek Archaeological Service, investigated sites in the hinterland of Pylos in the early 1950s, alongside the excavations of the palace led by Carl Blegen. Marinatos excavated 31 or 32 tombs at Volimidia between 1952 and 1965, (Note: Coulson 1988, p. 53 (32); Vlachopoulos 2021, p. 232 (31).) including one cleared in 1952 by George E. Mylonas, his colleague in the Archaeological Service. At the time of Marinatos's excavation, most of the tombs had been looted; he prioritised work on those tombs with subsided roofs, as this made them highly visible to potential looters and was the most common means by which they were identified. In his publications, Marinatos recorded the excavation of the first eight tombs in 1952; this was followed by the publication of nine in 1953, three in 1954 (plus the bath-house), three in 1960, three in 1964, and of six, in the Kefalovryso cluster, in 1965.

Marinatos attempted to find the settlement he believed to be associated with the cemetery: he opened a test trench in 1953, in a field owned by the Patriarcheas family 100 metres (110 yd) to the south of the Angelopoulos cluster, where he found traces of walls from the Late Helladic III period and a lower level, without walls. The latter deposit included a dense concentration of Vapheio-style cups, which Marinatos took to indicate an apothetis ('rubbish-dump'). Marinatos dated the lower level to Late Helladic I (c. 1600 – c. 1510 BCE); later study by Yannis Lolos considered it a mixture of Late Helladic I and Late Helladic IIA (c. 1510 – c. 1450 BCE) material.

Two further chamber tombs in the Kefalovryso cluster, designated A and B, were excavated by the Greek Archaeological Service in 1972, under the direction of Theodora Karagiorga-Stathakopoulou. In 1990, rescue excavations were undertaken by the Archaeological Service of a tomb discovered and damaged during building work. The tomb was found to contain a burial in the chamber, five burial pits dug into its floor, and a further pile of bones within it. All of the burial pits contained human bones; one held the remains of at least three individuals. Finds from the tomb included various pottery vessels and a psi-type figurine, the latter of a type produced between the Late Helladic IIA and Late Helladic III periods. George S. Korres excavated another chamber tomb, near the Tsoulea–Voria cluster, in 1991.

== Bibliography ==
- Alcock, Susan E. (1991). "Tomb Cult and the Post-Classical Polis". American Journal of Archaeology. 95 (3): 447–467. doi:10.2307/505491. ISSN 0002-9114. JSTOR 505491.
- Alcock, Susan E. (2023) [1998]. "Tomb Cult in Postliberation Messenia". In Davis, Jack L. (ed.). Sandy Pylos: An Archaeological History from Nestor to Navarino (2nd ed.). Princeton: American School of Classical Studies at Athens. pp. 199–204. ISBN 978-1-62139-046-6.
- Antonaccio, Carla (1994). An Archaeology of Ancestors: Tomb Cult and Hero Cult in Early Greece. Lanham: Rowman & Littlefield. ISBN 0-8476-7941-1.
- Arapoyianni, Xeni (1995). Νόμος Μεσσηνίας [Prefecture of Messenia] (PDF). Αρχαιολογικόν Δελτίον [Archaeological Bulletin] (in Greek). 45 (2): 120.
- Bennet, John (1995). "Space Through Time: Diachronic Perspectives on the Spatial Organization of the Pylian State". In Niemeier, Wolf-Dietrich; Laffineur, Robert (eds.). Politeia: Society and State in the Aegean Bronze Age. Aegaeum. Vol. 12. University of Liège. pp. 587–602. ISBN 0-904887-15-4.
- Bennet, John (1999). "The Mycenaean Conception of Space, or Pylian Geography (Yet Again...!)". In Deger-Jalkotzy, Sigrid; Hiller, Stefan; Panagl, Oswald (eds.). Floreant Studia Mycenaea: Acten des X. internationalen mykenologischen Colloquiums in Salzburg vom 1.–5. Mai 1995. Vol. 1. Vienna: Austrian Academy of Sciences. pp. 131–157. ISBN 3-7001-2787-1.
- Bennet, John (2023) [1998]. "The Linear B Archives and the Kingdom of Nestor". In Davis, Jack L. (ed.). Sandy Pylos: An Archaeological History from Nestor to Navarino (2nd ed.). Princeton: American School of Classical Studies at Athens. pp. 111–133. ISBN 978-1-62139-046-6.
- Boyd, Michael J. (2002). Middle Helladic and Early Mycenaean Mortuary Practices in the Southern and Western Peloponnese. British Archaeological Reports International Series. Vol. 1009. Oxford: Archaeopress. ISBN 1-84171-287-6 – via Academia.edu.
- Buck, Robert J. (1966). "The Middle Helladic Period". Phoenix. 20 (3): 193–209. doi:10.2307/1086478. ISSN 0031-8299. JSTOR 1086478.
- Castleden, Rodney (2005). The Mycenaeans. London and New York: Routledge. ISBN 0-415-36336-5.
- Chadwick, John (1957). "Potnia". Minos: Revista de Filología Egea [Minos: Review of Aegean Philology]. 5: 117–129. ISSN 0544-3733.
- Chadwick, John (1972). "The Mycenaean Documents". In McDonald, William; Rapp, George (eds.). The Minnesota Messenia Expedition: Reconstructing a Bronze Age Regional Environment. Minneapolis: University of Minnesota Press. pp. 100–116. ISBN 0-8166-0636-6.
- Coulson, William D. E. (1988). "Geometric Pottery from Volimidia". American Journal of Archaeology. 92 (1): 53–74. doi:10.2307/505870. JSTOR 505870.
- Davis, Jack L. (2021). "Spyridon Marinatos and Carl Blegen at Pylos: A Happy Collaboration". In Kalogeropoulos, Konstantinos; Vassilikou, Dora; Tiverios, Michalis (eds.). Sidelights on Greek Antiquity: Archaeological and Epigraphical Essays in Honour of Vasileios Petrakos. Berlin and Boston: De Gruyter. pp. 441–450. doi:10.1515/9783110699326-022. ISBN 978-3-11-069909-8. S2CID 233799176.
- Davis, Jack L. (2023) [1998]. "The Palace and Its Dependencies". In Davis, Jack L. (ed.). Sandy Pylos: An Archaeological History from Nestor to Navarino (2nd ed.). Princeton: American School of Classical Studies at Athens. pp. 53–68. ISBN 978-1-62139-046-6.
- Davis, Jack L. (2025). "Inventing Nestor's Kingdom". In Stocker, Sharon; Lyons, Claire L.; Davis, Jack L.; Militsi-Kechagia, Evangelia (eds.). The Kingdom of Pylos: Warrior-Princes of Mycenaean Greece. Los Angeles: J. Paul Getty Museum. pp. 128–129. ISBN 978-1-60606-967-7.
- Feuer, Bryan (2004) [1996]. Mycenaean Civilization: An Annotated Bibliography Through 2002 (Revised ed.). Jefferson: McFarland. ISBN 978-0-7864-1748-3.
- Fitzsimons, Rodney D. (2007). "Architecture and Power in the Bronze Age Argolid". In Driessen, Jan; Bretschneider, Joachim; van Lerberghe, Karel (eds.). Power and Architecture: Monumental Public Architecture in the Bronze Age Near East and Aegean. Leuven: Peeters. pp. 93–116. ISBN 978-90-429-1831-3.
- Hall, Jonathan M. (2014). A History of the Archaic Greek World, ca 1000–479 BC (2nd ed.). Chichester: Wiley-Blackwell. ISBN 978-1-118-30127-2.
- Hiller, Stefan (2011). "Mycenaean Religion and Cult" (PDF). In Duhoux, Yves; Morpurgo Davies, Anna (eds.). A Companion to Linear B: Mycenaean Greek Texts and Their World. Vol. 2. Louvain-la-Neuve: Peeters. pp. 169–211. ISBN 978-90-429-2932-6.
- Hope Simpson, Richard (1982). Mycenaean Greece. Park Ridge, New Jersey: Noyes Press. ISBN 0-8155-5061-8 – via Internet Archive.
- Hope Simpson, Richard (2014). Mycenaean Messenia and the Kingdom of Pylos. Philadelphia: INSTAP Academic Press. ISBN 978-1-931534-92-5.
- Judson, Anna P. (2020). The Undeciphered Signs of Linear B: Interpretation and Scribal Practices. Cambridge University Press. doi:10.1017/9781108859745. ISBN 978-1-108-85974-5. Archived from the original on 3 March 2023.
- Korres, George S. (1993). "Messenia and Its Commercial Connections During the Bronze Age". In Zerner, Carol W. (ed.). Wace and Blegen: Pottery as Evidence for Trade in the Aegean Bronze Age, 1939-1989. Proceedings of the International Conference, Athens, December 2–3, 1989. Leiden: Brill. pp. 231–248. ISBN 90-5063-089-8.
- Lolos, Yannis G. (2023) [1998]. "Mycenaean Burial at Pylos". In Davis, Jack L. (ed.). Sandy Pylos: An Archaeological History from Nestor to Navarino (2nd ed.). Princeton: American School of Classical Studies at Athens. pp. 75–78. ISBN 978-1-62139-046-6.
- Lupack, Susan (2011). "Redistribution in Aegean Palatial Societies. A View from Outside the Palace". American Journal of Archaeology. 115 (2): 207–217. doi:10.3764/aja.115.2.0207. ISSN 0002-9114. JSTOR 10.3764/aja.115.2.0207. Archived from the original on 5 September 2015.
- Lupack, Susan (2024). "How Elitist Were Typical Mycenaean Communities? Investigating Relative Status in Mycenaean Damoi Through the Landholders of the Pylos Ep and Ea Series". Oxford Journal of Archaeology. 43 (3): 226–236. doi:10.1111/ojoa.12302. ISSN 1468-0092.
- Marinatos, Spyridon (1952). Ανασκαφαί εν Πύλῳ [Excavations at Pylos] (PDF). Πρακτικά της εν Αθήναις Αρχαιολογικής Εταιρείας [Proceedings of the Archaeological Society of Athens] (in Greek). 107: 473–496. ISSN 1105-0969.
- Marinatos, Spyridon (1953). Ανασκαφαί εν Πύλῳ [Excavations at Pylos] (PDF). Πρακτικά της εν Αθήναις Αρχαιολογικής Εταιρείας [Proceedings of the Archaeological Society of Athens] (in Greek). 108: 238–250. ISSN 1105-0969.
- Marinatos, Spyridon (1954). Ανασκαφαί εν Πύλῳ [Excavations at Pylos] (PDF). Πρακτικά της εν Αθήναις Αρχαιολογικής Εταιρείας [Proceedings of the Archaeological Society of Athens] (in Greek). 109: 299–316. ISSN 1105-0969.
- Marinatos, Spyridon (1960a). Ανασκαφαί Πύλου [Excavations of Pylos] (PDF). Πρακτικά της εν Αθήναις Αρχαιολογικής Εταιρείας [Proceedings of the Archaeological Society of Athens] (in Greek). 116: 195–209. ISSN 1105-0969.
- Marinatos, Spyridon (1960b). Ανασκαφαί Πύλου (1952–1960) [Excavations at Pylos (1952–1960)]. Αρχαιολογικόν Δελτίον [Archaeological Bulletin] (in Greek). 16: 112–119. ISSN 0570-622X.
- Marinatos, Spyridon (1964). Ανασκαφαί Πύλου [Excavations of Pylos] (PDF). Πρακτικά της εν Αθήναις Αρχαιολογικής Εταιρείας [Proceedings of the Archaeological Society of Athens] (in Greek). 120: 78–95. ISSN 1105-0969.
- Marinatos, Spyridon (1965). Ανασκαφαί εν Πύλῳ [Excavations at Pylos] (PDF). Πρακτικά της εν Αθήναις Αρχαιολογικής Εταιρείας [Proceedings of the Archaeological Society of Athens] (in Greek). 121: 102–120. ISSN 1105-0969.
- Montecchi, Barbara (2016). "Pu-ro, pa-ki-ja-na/ne, and the Sanctuary of Poseidon at Pylos". Studi Micenei ed Ego-Anatolici. 2: 119–136. ISSN 1126-6651 – via Academia.edu.
- Olsen, Barbara A. (1998). "Women, Children and the Family in the Late Aegean Bronze Age: Differences in Minoan and Mycenaean Constructions of Gender". World Archaeology. 29 (3): 380–392. doi:10.1080/00438243.1998.9980386. JSTOR 125037.
- Papadopoulos, John K. (2017). Introduction. The Early Iron Age: The Cemeteries. By Papadopoulos, John K.; Smithson, Evelyn Lord. The Athenian Agora. Vol. 36. Princeton: American School of Classical Studies at Athens. pp. 1–34. ISBN 978-0-87661-236-1.
- Shelmerdine, Cynthia (2008). "Introduction: Background, Methods and Sources". In Shelmerdine, Cynthia (ed.). The Cambridge Companion to the Aegean Bronze Age. Cambridge University Press. pp. 1–18. doi:10.1017/CCOL9780521814447.001. ISBN 978-1-139-00189-2.
- Spencer, Nigel (1995). "Heroic Time: Monuments and the Past in Messenia, Southwest Greece". Oxford Journal of Archaeology. 14 (3): 247–292. doi:10.1111/j.1468-0092.1995.tb00064.x.
- Spencer, Nigel (2023) [1998]. "The History of Archaeological Investigations in Messenia". In Davis, Jack L. (ed.). Sandy Pylos: An Archaeological History from Nestor to Navarino (2nd ed.). Princeton: American School of Classical Studies at Athens. pp. 23–41. ISBN 978-1-62139-046-6.
- Tsonou-Herbst, Ioulia (2010). "Figurines". In Cline, Eric (ed.). The Oxford Handbook of the Bronze Age Aegean. Oxford University Press. pp. 210–222. ISBN 978-0-19-536550-4.
- Vlachopoulos, Andreas (2021). "The Early Μycenaeans of Pylos: The Evidence from the Chamber Tomb Cemetery at Volimidia". In Eder, Birgitta; Zavadil, Michaela (eds.). (Social) Place and Space in Early Mycenaean Greece: International Discussions in Mycenaean Archaeology, October 5-8, 2016, Athens. Mykenische Studien. Vol. 35. Vienna: Austrian Academy of Sciences Press. pp. 231–272. ISBN 978-3-7001-8854-4 – via Academia.edu.
- Whitley, James (2003). Style and Society in Dark Age Greece: The Changing Face of a Pre-Literate Society 1100–700 BC. Cambridge University Press. ISBN 0-521-54585-4.
- Zavadil, Michaela (2021). "Mycenaean Messenia in the Making: The Evidence from the Tholos Tombs". In Eder, Birgitta; Zavadil, Michaela (eds.). (Social) Place and Space in Early Mycenaean Greece: International Discussions in Mycenaean Archaeology, October 5-8, 2016, Athens. Mykenische Studien. Vol. 35. Vienna: Austrian Academy of Sciences Press. pp. 283–294. ISBN 978-3-7001-8854-4 – via Academia.edu.
- Zikidi, Clare (2025). "Mortuary Salience and the Treatment of the Dead in Messenia, from the Middle Helladic to the Late Helladic Period". Cambridge Archaeological Journal. doi:10.1017/S0959774325000010.
