= List of Mycenaean deities =

List of Greek deities from the Mycenaean civilization

Many of the Greek deities are known from as early as Mycenaean (Late Bronze Age) civilization. This is an incomplete list of these deities (Note: This list includes deities which in later Greek times and sources were thought of as semigods or mortal heroes. Scholars assign to attested words in Linear B a possibility or probability, sometimes controversially, of being a theonym or an anthroponym, a toponym, etc.; Mycenaean Linear B sources are often damaged inscriptions bearing lacunae, and in any case, they are too few to enable classifications with certainty. Finally there is a list of attested words which seem to refer to mortals or whose reference is unclear, yet they may have a connection to religion or to a divine or heroic figure of later times.) and of the way their names, epithets, or titles are spelled and attested in Mycenaean Greek, written in the Linear B (Note: The names/words in Linear B and the transliteration thereof are not necessarily in the nominative case and also not necessarily of said gods per se, as e.g. in the case of Hephaestus.) syllabary, along with some reconstructions and equivalent forms in later Greek.

== Deities ==
=== Pantheon ===
Name			Notes	
English	Linear B	Transliteration	Comments	Footnotes
Pantes Theoi	𐀞𐀯𐀳𐀃𐀂	pa-si-te-o-i	"To All the Gods"; a special invocation, irrespective of sex, etc.; recurrently attested at Knossos	(Note: This term is for example found, on the Kn Fp 1 and KN Fp 13 tablets.) (Note: It should be made clear that an absence of offerings, in parallel, to explicitly named deities or people (like priests or priestesses) on relevant attested inscriptions, does not necessarily follow from the presence of this special dedication; for example, the Kn Fp 1 inscription also includes, among others, offerings to Zeus Diktaios, Pade, Erinys and Anemon Hiereia.) (Note: The words are two - despite the lack of a separator symbol - and in the dative plural case; their reconstructed form is *pansi tʰeoihi; see the words πᾶς, θεός.)

=== Gods ===
Name			Notes	
English	Linear B	Transliteration	Comments	Footnotes
Anemoi	𐀀𐀚𐀗𐀂𐀋𐀩𐀊 / 𐀀𐀚𐀗𐄀𐀂𐀋𐀩𐀊	a-ne-mo-i-je-re-ja / a-ne-mo,i-je-re-ja	attested through *Anemohiereia or *Anemon Hiereia, "Priestess of the Winds"	(Note: See the noun ἱέρεια.) (Note: Found on the KN Fp 1 and KN Fp 13 tablets.) (Note: The inscriptions read that the offers are made to her, thus they could refer to a goddess; this is not though, what modern scholars seem to believe.) (Note: The first cited form could just be an instance of a scribe forgetting to write the word-separator sign 𐄀 between two words. In that case *Anemohiereia should be instead read as *Anemon Hiereia also.)
Apollo(?)	𐀟𐁊	pe-rjo-, reconstructed a-pe-rjo-ne	perhaps attested through, though doubted, the lacunose perio, though it probably refers to Hyperion	(Note: Found on the lacunose KN E 842 tablet.)
Ares	𐀀𐀩	a-re		
Despotas	𐀈𐀡𐀲	do-po-ta	unclear, perhaps house deity, euphemism for Hades meaning master(?)	(Note: Found on the PY Tn 316 tablet.) (Note: Cf. the nouns δεσπότης, δόμος, πόσις; whence despot in English; in an etymological sense, it literally means "master of the house" and is related to potnia.) (Note: The word Poseidon (Ποσειδῶν; variant forms include Ποσειδάων, the former's final syllable being a synaeresis of the latter's final two) itself, could be connected in an etymological sense - cf. πόσις - to Despotas (if indeed this is the correct reading-interpretation of do-po-ta) and Potnia; likewise compare the same word in connection to Ge-Gaia (hence possibly to Ma Ga) and the possible Enesidaon and other undoubted later-times epithets of him, in consideration of the word-endings, etc.. Moreover some scholars have connected - in a similar manner to the one of Poseidon - Demeter to "Earth" via the De (Da; considered in this case as Pre-Greek and as meaning "Earth") syllable, the goddess thus viewed as representing Da-Mater, "Mother Earth" or similar; others on the other hand have interpreted Demeter's Da syllable as related to domos (i.e. to be Indo-European), interpreting her name as "Mother of the House", creating thus an etymological connection to Despotas and Potnia. À propos, some scholars have considered the attested, on the PY En 609 tablet, Mycenaean word 𐀅𐀔𐀳, da-ma-te, as reading Demeter, but the view is not widely held anymore; the former is indeed thought to be connected to domos, etc, but it is believed to probably be a form of, or something similar to, δάμαρ.)
Dionysus	𐀇𐀺𐀝𐀰	di-wo-nu-so	son of Zeus, unknown whether wine god from early on	(Note: According to Chadwick, "Dionysos surprisingly appears twice at Pylos, in the form Diwonusos, both times irritatingly enough on fragments, so that we have no means of verifying his divinity". This old view can be found reflected in other scholars but this has changed after the 1989-90 Greek-Swedish excavations at Kastelli Hill, Chania, unearthed the KH Gq 5 tablet.)
Dipsioi	𐀇𐀠𐀯𐀍𐀂	di-pi-si-jo-i	meaning obscure: perhaps "The Thirsty and hence the Dead Ones" possibly referring to ancestor worship or slain gods possibly the Titans; perhaps related to Thessalian month Dipsos	(Note: Cf. the verb διψάω-ῶ.)
Drimios	𐀇𐀪𐀖𐀍	di-ri-mi-jo	son of Zeus, uncertain if son of Hera too, if not a separate god, perhaps title for Apollo, Dionysus or Ares(?)	(Note: The inscription reads (line 10): di-ri-mi-jo⌞ ⌟di-wo,i-je-we, i.e. *Drimiōi Diwos hiēwei, "to Drimios, the son of Zeus".) (Note: Drimios likely formed a cult group with Zeus and Hera, perhaps the son of this couple, who was forgotten by archaic times.)
Enyalius	𐀁𐀝𐀷𐀪𐀍	e-nu-wa-ri-jo	a later epithet of Ares, or his son with Enyo, maybe a title for his father Zeus.	
Hephaestus	𐀀𐀞𐀂𐀴𐀍	a-pa-i-ti-jo	regarded as indirectly attested by the name *Haphaistios or *Haphaistion, presumed to be a theophoric name	
Hermes	𐀁𐀔𐁀	e-ma-*25 or e-ma-ha		(Note: 𐀁𐀔𐁀, when in the nominative, is thought to be read as Ἑρμάἁς (Ἑρμάhας).)
Areias	𐀀𐀩𐀊	a-re-ja	epithet (Hermes as war god)	
Hyperion	𐀟𐁊	pe-rjo-, reconstructed u-pe-rjo-ne	perhaps attested through the lacunose perio if it doesn't refer to Apollo	(Note: Found on the lacunose KN E 842 tablet.)
Marineus(?)	𐀔𐀪𐀚 / 𐀔𐀪𐀚𐀸 / 𐀔𐀪𐀚𐀺	ma-ri-ne(-u?) / ma-ri-ne-we / ma-ri-ne-wo	unknown deity, perhaps "God of the Woolens", meaning obscure, perhaps Pan.	
Pade(?)	𐀞𐀆 / 𐀞𐀆𐀂	pa-de / pa-de-i	possibly unknown god, thought to be Cretan, Minoan in origin, or maybe Zagreus as the divine child.	
Paean	𐀞𐀊𐀺𐀚	pa-ja-wo-ne	could be a medical epithet of Apollo but could also very likely be a separate deity	(Note: Hiller's or Schofield's pa-ja-wo is not actually attested per se; the word actually attested on the damaged KN V 52 tablet and the fragments thereof, reads pa-ja-wo-ne; the latter would be the dative case form of the former.)
Poseidon	𐀡𐀮𐀅𐀃 / 𐀡𐀮𐀅𐀺𐀚	po-se-da-o / po-se-da-wo-ne	chief deity in Pylos	
Enesidaon	𐀁𐀚𐀯𐀅𐀃𐀚	e-ne-si-da-o-ne	epithet of Poseidon meaning "Earthshaker", and a similar epithet was used by Hesiod when pairing Poseidon with Amphitrite	(Note: Found on the KN M 719 tablet.) (Note: Cf. Ἐνοσίχθων, Ἐννοσίγαιος, Poseidon's later epithets.)
Trisheros	𐀴𐀪𐀮𐀫𐀁	ti-ri-se-ro-e	theonym, "Thrice-Hero"; thought to attest, and pertain to, the veneration of the dead or the Tritopatores	(Note: Found on the PY Tn 316 and PY Fr 1204 tablets.) (Note: See the words τρίς, ἥρως.) (Note: It is generally thought to be connected to τριπάτορες, i.e. the "collective, anonymous family ancestors", but it could perhaps instead refer to Triptolemus, himself possibly "a 'hypostasis' of Poseidon".)
Wanax	𐀷𐀙𐀏𐀳	wa-na-ka-te	"The King"; in this case, it is considered to be a theonym in the dative case, perhaps as an epithet of Poseidon and Zeus	(Note: The King and the Two Queens are sometimes attested on tablets together, in the offerings or the libations to them; forms of both "the King" and "the Two Queens" are in the dative case. An example of said concurrent attested worship is the PY Fr 1227 tablet.) (Note: On the other hand, there are scholars who have argued that "the King" and "the Two Queens" are not theonyms, that they simply refer to mortal royalty.)
Zephyrus	𐀽𐁆𐀫	ze-pu_{2}-ro	One of the wind gods	
Zeus	𐀇𐀸 / 𐀇𐀺	di-we / di-wo	God of the sky	
Diktaios	𐀇𐀏𐀲𐀍 𐀇𐀸	di-ka-ta-jo di-we	local epithet of Zeus on Crete	(Note: Pertaining to the Dikti.) (Note: Found on the KN Fp 1 tablet.)
Glaucus	𐀏𐀨𐀄𐀒	ka-ra-u-ko	could be the theonym of the hero turned god Glaucus, but possibly just a mortal	
Nereus(?)	𐀚𐀩𐀄	ne-re-u	could be the theonym of the sea god Nereus, could also be Neleus, the King of Pylos(?)	
Phorcys(?)	𐀡𐀫𐀪	po-ro-ko	could be the theonym of the sea god Phorcys, could also be an anthroponym(?)	

=== Goddesses ===
Name			Notes	
English	Linear B	Transliteration	Comments	Footnotes
Artemis	𐀀𐀳𐀖𐀵 / 𐀀𐀴𐀖𐀳	a-te-mi-to / a-ti-mi-te		
Diwia	𐀇𐀄𐀊 / 𐀇𐀹𐀊	di-u-ja / di-wi-ja	possibly the female counterpart of Zeus, possibly Dione in later Greek	
Demeter	(?)	(?)	Damate in Linear A and B	
Gaia(?)	(?)	(?)	perhaps attested through Ma-Ga, meaning Mother Earth, but could also refer to Demeter, whose name also means Mother Earth	
Doqeia(?)	𐀈𐀤𐀊	do-qe-ja	possibly an unknown goddess but could be only a feminine adjective	(Note: Found on the PY An 607 tablet.)
Eileithyia	𐀁𐀩𐀄𐀴𐀊	e-re-u-ti-ja	attested in the Cretan Eleuthia form; perhaps Minoan in origin(?)	
Selene	(?)	(?)	perhaps attested through meno, meaning month, related to Selene's epithet Mene	
Eos	𐀀𐀺𐀂𐀍	a-wo-i-jo	perhaps attested through a personal name Ἀϝohιος related to the word for dawn, or dative form Āwōiōi	(Note: Found in a tablet from Pylos, also found on the KN Dv 1462 tablet.) (Note: Foreign scholars interpret this name as "matinal", "matutino", "mañanero", meaning "of the early morning", "of the dawn".)
Iris	𐀂𐀪	i-ri	perhaps attested at Pylos through îris	
Erinyes	𐀁𐀪𐀝 / 𐀁𐀪𐀝𐀸	e-ri-nu / e-ri-nu-we	both forms of the theonym are considered to be in the singular, Erinys, in the Arcadian myth refers to Demeter and also used as an epithet for Demeter by Pausanias	(Note: Found on the KN Fp 1, KN V 52, and KN Fh 390 tablets.)
Hera	𐀁𐀨	e-ra	possibly wife of Zeus from early on	
Iphemedeia	𐀂𐀟𐀕𐀆𐀊	i-pe-me-de-ja	theonym; probably variant form of Iphimedia, name of a mythological person found in Homer's Odyssey	
Komawenteia(?)	𐀒𐀔𐀸𐀳𐀊	ko-ma-we-te-ja	possibly unknown deity, possibly meaning "long-haired goddess"	(Note: Cf. ko-ma-we, κομήεις, κόμη.)
Leto	𐀨𐀴𐀍 / 𐀨𐀵	ra-ti-jo / ra-to	perhaps attested through the forms Latios and Lato	(Note: Found on the KN Xd 58 tablet. Some doubts have been cast over its connection to Leto due to the non-matching geography.)
Manasa	𐀔𐀙𐀭	ma-na-sa	unknown goddess	(Note: Cf. the Hindu goddess of the same name.)
Mater Theia	𐀔𐀳𐀩𐄀𐀳𐀂𐀊	ma-te-re,te-i-ja	possibly "Mother of the Gods" (Rhea or Gaia?) or Mother Theia, probably mother of Helios, Selene and Eos from early on(?)	(Note: See the nouns μήτηρ, θεός, θεά and the adjective θεῖος-α-ον.)
Pipituna	𐀠𐀠𐀶𐀙	pi-pi-tu-na	Reconstructed as *Πίπτυννα (Píptynna); unknown deity, considered to be Pre-Greek or Minoan	(Note: Cf. Diktynna about word formation, considered to be characteristically Pre-Greek.)
Posidaeia	𐀡𐀯𐀅𐀁𐀊	po-si-da-e-ja	probably the female counterpart to Poseidon, most likely early name for Amphitrite	
Potnia	𐀡𐀴𐀛𐀊	po-ti-ni-ja	"Mistress" or "Lady"; may be used as an epithet for many deities, but also shows up as a single deity	
Potnia Athena	𐀀𐀲𐀙𐀡𐀴𐀛𐀊	a-ta-na-po-ti-ni-ja	Potnia At(h)ana, early variant name of Athena	(Note: Found on the KN V 52 tablet.)
Potnia Hippeia	𐀡𐀴𐀛𐀊𐄀𐀂𐀤𐀊	po-ti-ni-ja,i-qe-ja	Mistress of the Horses; later epithet of Demeter and Athena	(Note: See the words ἵππειος-α-ον, ἵππος.) (Note: Could also be precursor of Leto.)
Potnia of Sitos	𐀯𐀵𐀡𐀴𐀛𐀊	si-to-po-ti-ni-ja	Mistress of Grain; Bronze Age reference to Demeter	(Note: See the noun σῖτος and the epithet Σιτώ.)
Potnia of the Labyrinth	𐀅𐁆𐀪𐀵𐀍𐄀𐀡𐀴𐀛𐀊	da-pu_{2}-ri-to-jo,po-ti-ni-ja		
Potnia, at Thebes	𐀡𐀴𐀛𐀊𐄀𐀺𐀒𐀆	po-ti-ni-ja,wo-ko-de	of no attested name or title, other than that offers are made to her house, her premises likely the Sphinx	(Note: Said Potnia or Potnia in general is found on only one table at Thebes: TH Of 36. Her premises, her house is thought to have been her shrine.)
Potnia, of unidentified Pylos sanctuary	𐀡𐀴𐀛𐀊	po-ti-ni-ja	unknown local(?) goddess of pa-ki-ja-ne (*Sphagianes?) sanctuary at Pylos	(Note: The word, on the same tablet, 𐀡𐀩𐀙, po-re-na, *phorenas, understood to mean "those brought or those bringing" (it actually reads 𐀡𐀩𐀙𐀤, po-re-na-qe, but a postfixed 𐀤, qe, is usually a conjunction; cf. καί, τε, and Latin et, qve), has been interpreted by some scholars as evidence of human sacrifice at said sanctuary: "According to this interpretation, the text of Tn 316 was written as one of many extreme emergency measures just before the destruction of the palace. Tn 316 would then reflect a desperate, and abnormal, attempt to placate divine powers through the sacrifice of male victims to male gods and female victims to female gods".) (Note: The nominative case form of the place (i.e. of the sanctuary) is 𐀞𐀑𐀊𐀚, pa-ki-ja-ne; it is also found in other forms, including derivative words; the specific form found on the PY Tn 316 tablet is 𐀞𐀑𐀊𐀯, pa-ki-ja-si, i.e. possibly its locative plural form.)
Potnia, of uncertain A place or epithet	𐀡𐀴𐀛𐀊𐄀𐀀𐀯𐀹𐀊	po-ti-ni-ja,a-si-wi-ja	Maybe Aphrodite as/or Astarte when she was introduced into Greece/Aphrodite identified with Astarte(?)	(Note: Possibly an ethnic or geographic adjective of Asia understood in this context as referring to Lydia or the Assuwa league; i.e. in the sense of, or similar to, Anatolia.) (Note: Perhaps an epithet of Artemis.)
Potnia, of unknown E place or epithet	𐀁𐀩𐀹𐀍𐀡𐀴𐀛𐀊	e-re-wi-jo-po-ti-ni-ja	another name for Hera(?), or maybe an early reference to Eris, but uncertain	(Note: Perhaps an epithet of Hera.)
Potnia, of unknown N place or epithet	𐀚𐀺𐀟𐀃𐄀𐀡𐀴𐀛𐀊	ne-wo-pe-o,po-ti-ni-ja	Perhaps Nike(?) or Nyx(?), highly unlikely	
Potnia, of unknown U place or epithet	𐀄𐀡𐀍𐀡𐀴𐀛𐀊	u-po-jo-po-ti-ni-ja	Perhaps Euphrosyne(?), highly unlikely	(Note: Could be some kind of "under" or "to weave" epithet; cf. the preposition ὑπό and the verb ὑφαίνω.)
Potnia, of unknown ? place or epithet	𐀀𐀐𐀯𐄀𐀡𐀴𐀛𐀊	(?)-a-ke-si,po-ti-ni-ja	Perhaps Hecate(?), highly unlikely	(Note: Found on the PY An 1281 tablet.)
Preswa(?)	𐀟𐀩𐁚	pe-re-*82 or pe-re-swa	generally interpreted as an early name of Persephone	
Qerasia(?)	𐀤𐀨𐀯𐀊	qe-ra-si-ja	unknown goddess, perhaps Minoan in origin or possibly connected with thēr	(Note: Possibly an epithet of Artemis; cf. Πότνια θηρῶν, θήρ.) (Note: Could be instead, form of Tiresias.)
Qowia(?)	𐀦𐀹𐀊	qo-wi-ja	epithet for Hera, possibly meaning "She of the Cow(s)" or "cow eyed"	(Note: Cf. the noun βοῦς.) (Note: Perhaps connected to proposed PIE *Gʷouu̯indā; cf. Govinda and Old Irish Boand.)
Wanasso(?)	𐀷𐀙𐀰𐀂	wa-na-so-i	"The Two Queens", possibly Demeter and Persephone; *wanassojin(?) regarded as a dative dual form	(Note: Also attested once on the PY 1219 table as 𐀷𐀜𐀰𐀂, wa-no-so-i.)
Possible goddesses
(?)	(?)	(?)	A possible sun goddess, predecessor to Helios(?), and possibly related to Helen(?). No unambiguous attestations of words for "sun" have yet been found, though the Mycenaean word for "sun" is reconstructed as *hāwélios.	(Note: See Etymology of Ἑλένη.)

== Heroes, mortals and other entities or concepts ==
Name			Notes	
English	Linear B	Transliteration	Comments	Footnotes
Proteus	𐀡𐀫𐀳𐀄	po-ro-te-u	could be the theonym of the sea-god Proteus, but probably just the anthroponym of a nobleman(?)	
Deucalion	𐀂𐀄𐀏𐀪𐀍	de-u-ka-ri-jo	could be Deucalion, the son of Prometheus, but probably just the anthroponym of a nobleman(?)	
Theseus	𐀳𐀮𐀄	te-se-u	could be Theseus, the King of Athens, but probably just the anthroponym of a nobleman(?)	
Achilles	𐀀𐀑𐀩𐀄	a-ki-re-u	a wealthy, high-ranking warrior at Knossos recorded as owning a chariot and two sets of armor	
Hector	𐀁𐀒𐀵	e-ko-to	on multiple tablets; typically listed as a regular craftsman or worker	
Tantalus	𐀲𐀲𐀫	ta-ta-ro	most likely a regular random mortal	
Castor	𐀏𐀵	ka-to	used as an everyday personal name	
Ajax(?)	𐀀𐀷	ai-wa	uncertain, possibly Ajax or maybe Ajax	
Augeas	𐀀𐀄𐀐𐀷	a-u-ke-wa	king of Elis(?)	
Alectryon	𐀀𐀩𐀓𐀵𐀬𐀺	a-re-ku-tu-ru-wo	possbibly a regular worker	
Orestes	𐀃𐀩𐀲	o-re-ta	son of Agamemnon in myth, recorded as a real shepherd in the Pylos archives	
Eteocles	𐀁𐀳𐀺𐀐𐀩𐀸𐀂𐀍	e-te-wo-ke-re-we-i-jo	prince of Thebes(?)	
Glaucus	𐀏𐀨𐀄𐀒	ka-ra-u-ko	could be the theonym of the hero turned god Glaucus, but possibly just a mortal	
Clymenus	𐀓𐀬𐀕𐀵	ku-ru-me-no	mythological king of Orchomenus, name appears several times in Mycenaean tallies	
Neleus(?)	𐀚𐀩𐀄	ne-re-u	King of Pylos(?), could also be the theonym of the sea god Nereus(?)	
Pandarus	𐀞𐀅𐀫	pa-da-ro	a prominent Trojan archer in the Iliad, found on Mycenaean administrative tallies	

== See also ==
- Aegean civilizations
- Cycladic culture
- Epigraphy
- History of Greece
- History of religions
- History of writing
- Leiden Conventions
- Linear A
- Linear B
- Mycenaean religion
- Palaeography

== Sources ==
=== Books ===
- Ventris, Michael; Chadwick, John (1973). Documents in Mycenaean Greek: Three Hundred Selected Tablets from Knossos, Pylos, and Mycenae. Cambridge, UK: Cambridge University Press. ISBN 9780521085588.
- Chadwick, John (1976). The Mycenaean World. Cambridge, UK: Cambridge University Press. ISBN 0-521-29037-6.
- Burkert, Walter (1985). Greek Religion. Harvard University Press. ISBN 0674362810.
- Castleden, Rodney (2003) [1990]. The Knossos Labyrinth. A New View of the 'Palace of Minos' at Knossos. Routledge. ISBN 9780415033152.
- Anthology of Classical Myth: Primary Sources in translation. Edited and translated by Stephen M. Trzaskoma, R. Scott Smith, Stephen Brunet; with an Appendix on Linear B Sources by Thomas G. Palaima. Hackett Publishing. 2004. ISBN 0-87220-721-8.
- Larson, Jennifer (2016). Understanding Greek Religion. Routledge. ISBN 978-0-415-68845-1.
- Budin, Stephanie Lynn (2004). The Ancient Greeks. New Perspectives. Understanding Ancient Civilizations. ABC-CLIO. ISBN 1576078140.
- Schofield, Louise (2007). The Mycenaeans. The British Museum Press. ISBN 978-0-89236-867-9.
- Fischer-Hansen, Tobias; Poulsen, Birte, eds. (2009). From Artemis to Diana. The Goddess of Man and Beast. 12 Acta Hyperborea. Collegium Hyperboreum and Museum Tusculanum Press. ISBN 9788763507882.
- Duhoux, Yves; Morpurgo Davies, Anna, eds. (2011). A Companion to Linear B: Mycenaean Greek Texts and their World. Vol. 2. Peeters. ISBN 9782758401162.

=== Articles in journals, periodicals and of conferences ===
- Suppléments au Bulletin de Correspondance Hellénique. La Crète mycénienne: Actes de la Table Ronde Internationale organisée par l'École française d'Athènes. Bulletin de Correspondance Hellénique. Vol. 30. Athens: Collections de l'Ecole française d'Athènes en ligne. 1997 [Date of Conference: 26–28 March 1991].
  - Hägg, Robin (1997). "Religious syncretism at Knossos and in post-palatial Crete?": 163–168.
  - Hiller, Stefan (1997). "Cretan sanctuaries and mycenaean palatial administration at Knossos": 205–212.
- Proceedings from the International Conference Antiquitas Viva. Antiquitas Viva. Živa Antika. Vol. 50. 2000 [Date of Conference: 5–7 December 2000].
  - Gulizio, Joann (2000). Hermes and e-ma-a_{2}: The continuity of his cult from the Bronze age to the historical period (PDF). pp. 105–116.
- Deger-Jalkotzy, Sigrid; Lemos, Irene S., eds. (2006) [Date of Conference: 22–25 January 2003]. Ancient Greece: From the Mycenaean Palaces to the Age of Homer. Edinburgh Leventis Studies 3. Edinburgh: Edinburgh University Press. ISBN 0748618899.
  - Palaima, Thomas G. (2006), Wanaks and related power terms in Mycenaean and later Greek (PDF), pp. 53–72
- Sacconi, A., ed. (2008) [Date of Conference: 20–25 February 2006]. "Colloquium romanum: The Shepherds in the Cn Series at Pylos; M. Lindgren, Use of the Cypriot Syllabary in a Multicultural Surrounding; S. Lupack, the Northeast Building of Pylos and an 1281; M. Marazzi, Il "sistema" Argolide: l'Organizzazione territoriale del golfo argolideo; M. Meier-Brügger, Une lecture en langue mycénienne des textes de la série Ta de Pylos; T. Meissner, Notes on Mycenaean Spelling; A. Michailidou, Late Bronze Age Economy: Copper". Colloquium Romanum: atti del XII colloquio internazionale di micenologia (in two volumes). XII colloquio internazionale di micenologia. Rome. Pasiphae. et al. Eds. Pisa and Rome. ISBN 9788862270564.
  - Gulizio, Joann (2008). "Mycenaean Religion at Knossos". Academia.edu.

=== Online databases and dictionaries ===
==== Mycenaean Greek and Linear B ====
- Palaeolexicon. Word study tool of ancient languages. c. 2008 and forwards.
- Aurora, Federico; Haug, Dag Trygve Truslew. DĀMOS: Database of Mycenaean at Oslo. Et alii. C. 2010 and forwards. University of Oslo. Department of Philosophy, Classics, History of Art and Ideas.
- Raymoure, K.A. "Linear B Transliterations". Dead Languages of the Mediterranean. C. 2012–2019. Archived from the original on 18 March 2016.

==== Ancient Greek, Latin and of English etymology ====
- A Latin Dictionary. Founded on Andrews' edition of Freund's Latin dictionary. Revised, enlarged, and in great part rewritten by Charlton T. Lewis, Ph.D. and Charles Short, LL.D. Oxford: Clarendon Press. 1879. At the Perseus Project, a digital library project of Tufts University.
- Francisco, Aura Jorro; Francisco, Rodríguez Adrados (1999). Diccionario Griego-Español, volumen II. Madrid. ISBN 84-00-06129-2.
- Liddell, Henry George; Scott, Robert (1889). An Intermediate Greek-English Lexicon. Oxford: Clarendon Press. At the Perseus Project.
- Liddell, Henry George; Scott, Robert (1940). A Greek-English Lexicon. Revised and augmented throughout by Sir Henry Stuart Jones with the assistance of Roderick McKenzie. Oxford: Clarendon Press. At the Perseus Project.
- Harper, Douglas. Online Etymology Dictionary. C. 2000 and forwards.
