= Potnia =

Ancient Greek feminine title

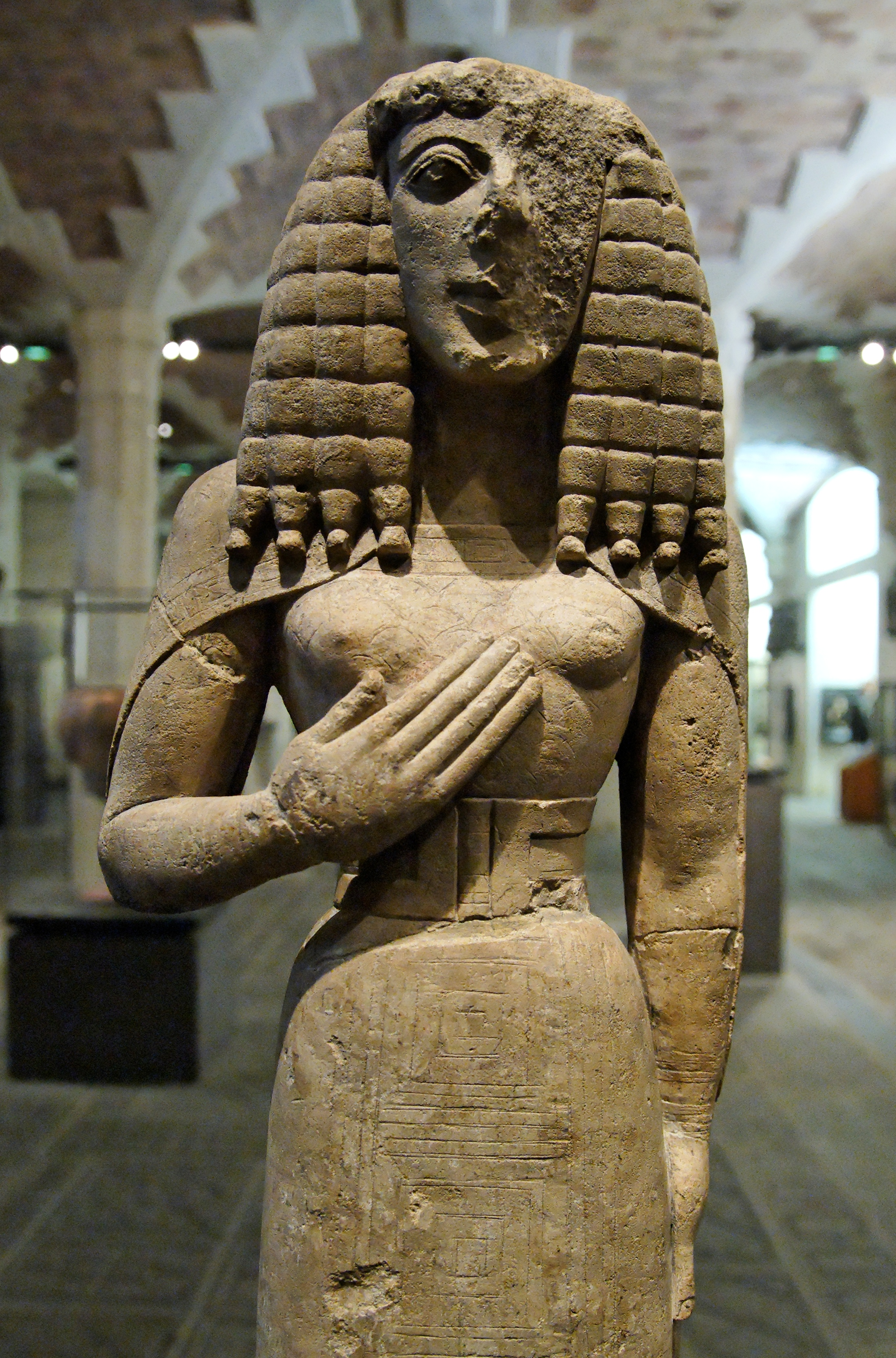
This Archaic image known as the Lady of Auxerre may be a version of the Minoan goddess, probably Kore or Despoina (c. 640–630 BCE, Louvre).

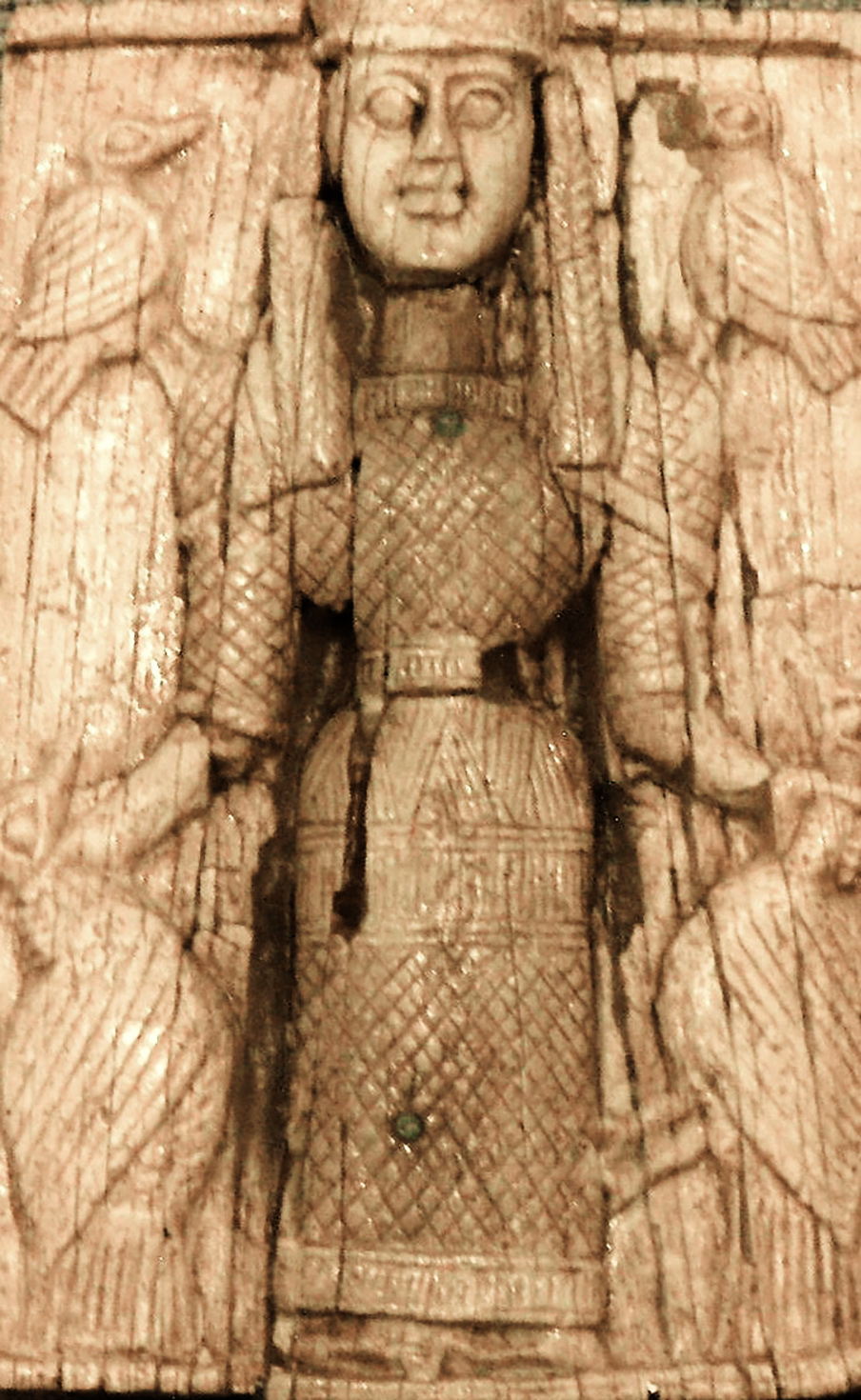
Artemis Orthia in the stance of Potnia Theron on an archaic ivory (National Archaeological Museum of Athens)

Potnia is an Ancient Greek word for "Mistress, Lady" and a title of a goddess. The word was inherited by Classical Greek from Mycenean Greek with the same meaning and it was applied to several goddesses. A similar word is the title Despoina, "the mistress", which was given to the nameless chthonic goddess of the mysteries of Arcadian cult. She was later conflated with Kore (Persephone), "the maiden", the goddess of the Eleusinian Mysteries, in a life-death rebirth cycle which leads the neophyte from death into life and immortality. Karl Kerenyi identifies Kore with the nameless "Mistress of the labyrinth", who probably presided over the palace of Knossos in Minoan Crete.

== Etymology ==
Potnia (Ancient Greek: πότνια, "mistress") is a poetic title of honour, used chiefly in addressing females, whether goddesses or women; its masculine analogue is posis (πόσις). Its hypothetical Proto-Indo-European (PIE) form *pot-nih_{a}-, "mistress", "lady", "wife", is the feminine counterpart to *pótis, "husband"; cf. Latin hospēs, "host", Sanskrit páti-, "master", "husband", fem. pátnī-, "lady", "wife". Potnia is attested in the Linear B script in 𐀡𐀴𐀛𐀊 po-ti-ni-ja. The word was inherited in classical Greek with the same meaning. A related Greek word is despoina ("Des-potnia" from PIE *dems-potnia meaning "mistress of the house"). An alternative etymology of the goddess Demeter comes through Potnia and Despoina ("Dems-meter", from PIE *dems-méh₂tēr, meaning "mother of the house").

Aaron Demsky suggests that in the Ekron inscription dedicated to the local goddess should be read "potnia" instead of Ptgyh.

== Origins ==
The figure of a goddess of nature, of birth and death was dominant during the Bronze Age, in both Minoan and Mycenean cults. In the Mycenean cult she was known by the title Potnia. The earliest references to the title are inscriptions in Linear B (Mycenean Greek) syllabic script found at Pylos and at Knossos, Crete, dated 1450-1300 BC. On a number of tablets from Pylos, we find po-ti-ni-ja (potnia) without any accompanying word. Chadwick suggests that she was the mother-goddess of the Mycenaeans. It seems that she had an important shrine at the site Pakijanes near Pylos. Wanax (wa-na-ka) was her male companion in the Mycenean cult, and this title was usually applied to the god Poseidon (po-se-da-o). Another epithet of Poseidon was e-ne-si-da-o-ne ("earth-shaker") and in the cave of Amnisos (Crete) Enesidaon is related to the cult of Eileithyia. She was a goddess of nature concerned with the annual birth of the divine child. Potnia and her male companion (paredros) survived in the Eleusinian cult, where the following words were uttered : "Mighty Potnia has born a strong son".

An inscription from Knossos refers to the "potnia of the labyrinth", who probably presided over the palace of Knossos (da-pu_{2}-ri-to-jo, po-ti-ni-ja). A famous Minoan seal impression found by Arthur Evans shows a nameless goddess brandishing a spear and standing upon the representation of a mountain flanked by rampant lions, and the representation seems similar to the Homeric potnia theron (the mistress of the animals).

Several tablets in Linear B script found at Knossos and Pylos refer to the potnia. Potnia is almost always accompanied by an epithet characterizing a particular place or function of the mistress : po-ti-ni-ja,a-si-wi-ja (a-si-wi-ja = ethnic adjective, possibly "Asian (Lydian) woman"), si-to-po-ti-ni-ja (sitos = "grain", of wheat or barley; probably referring to Demeter or her predecessor), po-ti-ni-ja,i-qe-ja (Potnia Hippeia, "Horse Goddess"). At Knossos a tablet refers to a-ta-na-po-ti-ni-ja, "potnia Athana", a form similar to the later Homeric form.

This divine title could be the translation of a similar title of Pre-Greek origin, just as the title "Our Lady" in Christianity is translated in several languages. The Pre-Greek name may be related to a-sa-sa-ra , a possible interpretation of some Linear A texts. Although Linear A is not yet deciphered, Palmer relates tentatively the word a-sa-sa-ra-me which seems to have accompanied goddesses, with the Hittite išhaššara, which means "lady or mistress", and especially with išhaššaramis (my lady).

== Classical Greece ==
In classical Greece the title potnia is usually applied to the goddesses Demeter, Artemis, Athena, and Persephone. This title was also given to the earth goddess Gaia (Ge). A similar title Despoina, "the mistress", was given to the nameless goddess of the mysteries of Arcadian cult, later conflated with Kore (Persephone), the goddess of the Eleusinian Mysteries. Homer in the Iliad (xxi 470) mentions a potnia theron ("mistress of the animals") who is obviously Artemis. Karl Kerenyi identifies Persephone with the nameless "mistress of the labyrinth". Demeter and Persephone were the two great goddesses of the Arcadian cults. According to Pausanias at Olympia they were called Despoinai ("mistresses", plural of Despoina). Demeter and Persephone were also called "Demeteres" as duplicates of the earth goddess with a double function as chthonic and vegetation goddesses.

== See also ==
- Despoina
- Persephone
- Potnia theron
- Poseidon
- List of Mycenaean deities
