= Chronological synchronism =

Chronological synchronism is an event that links two chronologies. For example, it is used in Egyptology to ground Egyptian chronology to other Calendar eras. The main types of chronological synchronism are synchronisms with other historical chronologies and synchronisms with precisely datable astronomical events.

Synchronisms with other chronologies often rely on some form of recorded communication between regions. For example, in Egyptology, the earliest such synchronisms appear in the 15th century BC, during the Amarna Period by the considerable quantity of diplomatic correspondence between Amenhotep III and Akhenaten and various ancient Near Eastern monarchs; that links Egyptian chronology with other Near Eastern chronologies.

Astronomical synchronisms rely on precise identification of astronomical events recorded in the historical record. The best known of these is the Sothic cycle whose careful study led Richard Anthony Parker to argue that the dates of the Twelfth Dynasty of Egypt could be fixed with absolute precision. More recent research has eroded that confidence and questioned many of the assumptions used with the Sothic Cycle. As a result, experts have moved away from relying on it.
