= Thomas G. Palaima =

American classical scholar (born 1951)

Thomas G. Palaima (born October 6, 1951) is a Mycenologist, the Robert M. Armstrong Centennial Professor and the founding director of the university's Program in Aegean Scripts and Prehistory (PASP) in the Department of Classics at the University of Texas at Austin.

== Biography ==
Palaima was born in Cleveland, Ohio on October 6, 1951. He received his B.A. in mathematics and classics from Boston College (1973) and a Ph.D. in classics from the University of Wisconsin–Madison (1980). On May 27, 1994, Palaima received an honorary doctorate from the Faculty of Humanities at Uppsala University, Sweden

Palaima received a five-year MacArthur fellowship in 1985 for work on Aegean scripts. In this area of research, he has focused on paleography, scribal systems, and the use of the Linear B tablets to answer questions about many aspects of life in Greek prehistory.

His other interests include writing public intellectual commentaries (over 300 since 1999), reviewing books on a broad range of subjects ancient and modern, and researching, writing, teaching, and lecturing about how humans, in groups or as individuals, respond to war and violence. He has served as academic co-director of the NEH Aquila Warrior Chorus Project in Austin for now three iterations 2016 into 2020. He also has helped to provide impoverished adults the opportunity to return to higher education through an innovative program that focuses on the humanities.

He has written extensively about music, especially about Bob Dylan and his cultural influence.

He has also studied and written about problems with NCAA athletics within American institutions of higher education. From 2008 through 2011, he was the representative of the University of Texas at Austin on the national Coalition on Intercollegiate Athletics.

He also has written about problems in higher education.

== Books and on-line lectures ==
- The Triple Invention of Writing in Cyprus and Written Sources for Cypriote History (Annual Lecture 2004: The Anastasios G. Leventis Foundation 2005).
- [with E. Pope and F. Kent Reilly] Unlocking the Secrets of Ancient Writing: The Parallel Lives of Michael Ventris and Linda Scheele and the Decipherment of Mycenaean and Mayan Writing, Catalogue of an Exhibition Held at the Nettie Lee Benson Latin American Collection, March 9–August 1, 2000 (Austin 2000).
- edited Aegean Seals, Sealings and Administrations, Proceedings of the NEH-Dickson Conference of the Program in Aegean Scripts and Prehistory of the Department of Classics, University of Texas at Austin January 11–13, 1989, Aegaeum 5 (Liège 1990).
- edited [with C.W. Shelmerdine and P. Hr. Ilievski] Studia Mycenaea (1988), Ziva Antika Monographies No. 7 (Skopje 1989).
- edited [with Y. Duhoux and J. Bennet] Problems in Decipherment, Bibliothèque des Cahiers de l'Institut de Linguistique de Louvain 49 (Louvain-la-Neuve 1989).
- The Scribes of Pylos, Incunabula Graeca 87 (Rome 1988).
- edited [with J.-P. Olivier] Texts, Tablets and Scribes: Studies in Mycenaean Epigraphy and Economy in Honor of Emmett L. Bennett, Jr., Minos Supplement 10 (Salamanca 1988).
- edited [with C.W. Shelmerdine] Pylos Comes Alive: Industry and Administration in a Mycenaean Palace, Papers of a Symposium of the Archaeological Institute of America and Fordham University (New York, 1984).
- "Combat Trauma and the Ancient Stage" New York University Aquila Theatre Company April 2011.
- "Debating the Cultural Evolution of War" with Steve Sonnenberg February 24, 2010.
- "Debate: College Football" with Lino Graglia December 25, 2009.
- "What Does the Iliad Tell Us About War and Why?" National Hellenic Museum Oscar Broneer lecture of the Archaeological Institute of America, February 6, 2014. https://www.youtube.com/watch?v=MDBUxnAsF74

== See also ==
- Pylos

https://sites.utexas.edu/scripts/about-pasp/== References ==
