= Aegean chronology =

Archaeological dating system

Map of the Aegean region, showing several sites from the Bronze Age

In archaeology, the Aegean chronology is a relative dating system used for the Aegean Bronze Age. It is based on the styles of pottery used in different regions at different times. The system is useful to avoid the problems of absolute dating in the Aegean region, where established methods such as radiocarbon dating and establishing chronological synchronisms between pieces of archaeological evidence give impossible or contradictory results.

The Aegean chronology is divided into three sub-chronologies, respectively for the Greek mainland, Crete, and the Cycladic islands:

- Helladic chronology
- Minoan chronology
- Cycladic chronology

== Bibliography ==
- Manning, Stuart W. (2010). "Chronology and Terminology". In Cline, Eric (ed.). The Oxford Handbook of the Bronze Age Aegean. Oxford University Press. pp. 11–30. ISBN 978-0-19-536550-4.
- Rutter, Jeremy. "Chronology Overview". Aegean Prehistoric Archaeology. Dartmouth University.
- Shelmerdine, Cynthia (2008). "Introduction: Background, Methods and Sources". In Shelmerdine, Cynthia (ed.). The Cambridge Companion to the Aegean Bronze Age. Cambridge University Press. pp. 1–18. doi:10.1017/CCOL9780521814447.001. ISBN 978-1-139-00189-2.
