= Dimitri Nakassis =

American classicist and archaeologist

- Born: 1975 (age 50–51)
- Awards: MacArthur fellowship

Academic background
- Education: University of Michigan; University of Texas

Dimitri Nakassis (born 1975) is an American classicist and archaeologist, and is a professor at the University of Colorado Boulder. He is also co-director of the Western Argolid Regional Project. He was awarded a MacArthur fellowship in 2015.

== Life ==
He graduated from the University of Michigan with a B.A., and from the University of Texas with a Ph.D.

== Work ==
Nakassis's work focuses on the archaeology and scripts of Mycenaean Greece, in particular the administrative practices of the state. His findings challenge assumptions that the palace economy of Mycenaean Greece had little in common with the democratic city-states of Ancient Greece. Since 2013, he has co-directed a project using Reflectance Transformation Imaging to create detailed 3D images of the Linear B tablets found in the Palace of Nestor.
