= Birgitta Eder =

Austrian historian

Academic background
- Education: University of Vienna

Academic work
- Discipline: Classical archaeology; Mycenology
- Institutions: University of Freiburg; Austrian Academy of Sciences

Birgitta Eder is an Austrian archaeologist and Mycenologist. She is the director of the Austrian Archaeological Institute at Athens.

== Education ==
Eder studied ancient history and classical archaeology at the University of Vienna from 1980 until 1986, followed by postgraduate study at University College London in 1988/89. She completed her PhD at the University of Vienna in 1995. During this period she also worked as a research assistant in the Mycenaean Commission of the Austrian Academy of Sciences.

== Career ==
Eder held an APART-Stipendum (Austrian Programme for Advanced Research and Technology) at the Austrian Academy of Sciences from 1998 until 2000. In 1997, she participated in the German Archaeological Institute excavation at Olympia. From 2001 until 2007, she continued to work as a researcher at the Mycenaean Commission of the Austrian Academy of Sciences. In 2007, she joined the department of Classical Archaeology of the Institute of Archaeological Science at the University of Freiburg. In 2013, she returned to the Austrian Academy of Sciences, where she worked as a researcher in the Institute for Oriental and European Archaeology, and from 2014 was the director of the Mycenaean Aegean research group. In 2018, she was awarded a habilitation at TU Darmstadt for the work Elis und Olympia: Die Genese zweier Zentren einer Landschaft ("Elis and Olympia: Genesis of two centres of a landscape"). In the same year, she was a visiting fellow at Merton College, Oxford.

Since 2019, Eder has been the director of the Austrian Archaeological Institute at Athens. She is project leader for excavations at Kakovatos and Kleidi-Samikon (with the Ephorate of Antiquities in Elis, co-director Erofili Kolia) in the Peloponnese.

In February 2020, she gave the Denys Haynes Memorial Lecture at the British Museum.

== Select publications ==
- (1998) Argolis, Lakonien und Messenien vom Ende der mykenischen Palastzeit bis zur Dorischen Einwanderung, Veröffentlichungen der Mykenischen Kommission Band 17.
- (1994) Staat, Herrschaft, Gesellschaft in frühgriechischer Zeit, eine Bibliographie 1978–1991/92, Veröffentlichungen der Mykenischen Kommission Band 14.
- (2001) Die submykenischen und protogeometrischen Gräber von Elis, Bibliothek der Griechischen Archäologischen Gesellschaft zu Athen 209.
- (2004) with Jung, R. "On the Character of Social Relations between Greece and Italy in the 12th/11th C. BC". In eds. E. Greco, R. Laffineur, Emporia. Aegeans in the Central and Eastern Mediterranean. Proceedings of the 10th International Aegean Conference/10e Rencontre égéenne internationale, Athens, Italian School of Archaeology (pp. 14–18).
- (2015) ed. with Regine Pruzsinszky, Policies of Exchange: Political Systems and Modes of Interaction in the Aegean and the Near East in the 2nd Millennium BC, Proceedings of the International Symposium at the University of Freiburg, Institute for Archaeological Studies, 30th May – 2nd June 2012, OREA 2.
- (2015) 'Unus pro omnibus, omnes pro uno: The Mycenaean Palace System', in F. Ruppenstein, J. Weilhartner (eds.), Tradition and Innovation in the Mycenaean Palatial Polities, Proceedings of an International Symposium held at the Austrian Academy of Sciences, Institute for Oriental and European Archaeology, Aegean and Anatolia Department, Vienna, 1–2 March 2013, Mykenische Studien 34.
