= Hippeia =

Greek mythology

Hippeia or Hippea (Ancient Greek: Ἱππεία) is the name of two characters in Greek mythology.

- Hippea, daughter of Antippus. She married Elatus and bore the Argonaut Polyphemus and Caeneus.
- Athena Hippeia (or Hippeia Athena, "Athena of Horses"; Ἱππεία Ἀθηνᾶ), Athena as a goddess of horses. In this form, she was said to be the daughter of Poseidon and Polyphe (others give the name Koryphe), daughter of Oceanus. She was given her name because she was the first to use a chariot.
