= Sigrid Deger-Jalkotzy =

Austrian archaeologist (born 1940)

- Born: 3 February 1940 (age 86); Linz, Nazi Germany
- Occupation: Archaeologist

Academic background
- Education: Austrian Academy of Sciences

Academic work
- Discipline: Classics
- Institutions: Austrian Academy of Sciences, University of Vienna, University of Salzburg

Sigrid Deger-Jalkotzy (née Sigrid Deger, also known as Sigrid Jalkotzy and Sigrid Jalkotzy-Deger; born February 3, 1940) is an Austrian archaeologist who served as president of the Division of Humanities and the Social Sciences at the Austrian Academy of Sciences, Vienna. She is known for her study of Mycenaean Greece.

== Career ==
Deger-Jalkotzy studied ancient history, classical philology and classical archaeology at the University of Vienna, where she received her doctorate in 1968. She also studied at the University of Music and Performing Arts in Vienna and at the University of Cambridge.

From 1975 to 1986, Sigrid Deger-Jalkotzy worked on the excavations of the Austrian Archaeological Institute in Aigeira in the Peloponnese. In 1976, she became a member of the Mycenaean Commission of the Austrian Academy of Sciences and, in 1978, university assistant to Gerhard Dobesch at the Institute for Ancient History and Classical Archaeology at the University of Vienna. The following year, she completed her habilitation at the University of Vienna in the subject "Ancient History with special reference to Mycenaeology and the history of the early cultures of the Eastern Mediterranean". In 1986, she was appointed professor to the chair of Ancient History and Classical Studies at the University of Salzburg. She worked as a guest professor at the universities of Saarbrücken, Heidelberg, Cologne and Rostock. After being vice dean of the Faculty of Humanities at Vienna from 1995 to 1999, she retired in 2008.

In the 2002-2003 academic year, she was the AG Leventis Visiting Professor at the University of Edinburgh, in which capacity she organised the conference ‘From wanax to basileus’, held at Edinburgh in January 2003.

In 2009, she was elected vice president of the Austrian Academy of Sciences (ÖAW). Since 2011, she has held the position of president of the philosophical-historical class of the ÖAW.

She also conducted excavations at Elateia in Thessaly between 1988 and 1992.

== Bibliography ==
- Deger-Jalkotzy, Sigrid (2009). "Mycenae and the Myceneaean Heritage". In Danielidou, Despina (ed.). Δώρον: τιμητικός τομός για τον καθηγητή Σπύρο Ιακωβίδη. Σειρά Μονογραφιών. pp. 211–229.
- Deger-Jalkotzy, Sigrid; Lemos, I.S., eds. (2006). Ancient Greece: From the Mycenaean Palaces to the Age of Homer. Edinburgh University Press.
- Shelmerdine, Cynthia, ed. (2008). The Cambridge Companion to the Aegean Bronze Age. Cambridge: Cambridge University Press.
