= Georg Karo =

German archaeologist (1872–1963)

- Karo c. 1928
- Born: Georg Heinrich Karo; 11 January 1872; Palazzo Barbaro, Venice, Italy
- Died: 12 November 1963 (aged 91); Freiburg im Breisgau, West Germany
- Known for: Excavations at Tiryns; publication of finds from Grave Circle A, Mycenae
- Spouse: Helene Wenck (m. 1940)
- Honours: Order of Franz Joseph; Order of the Redeemer (Commander); Order of Merit of the Federal Republic of Germany (Knight Commander's Cross)

Academic background
- Education: Ludwig-Maximilians-Universität München; University of Bonn (PhD, Hab.)
- Thesis: De arte vascularia antiquissima quaestiones (1896)
- Doctoral advisor: Georg Loeschcke

Academic work
- Institutions: University of Bonn; German Archaeological Institute at Athens; University of Halle; Claremont Colleges; University of Freiburg
- Notable students: Spyridon Marinatos

Signature
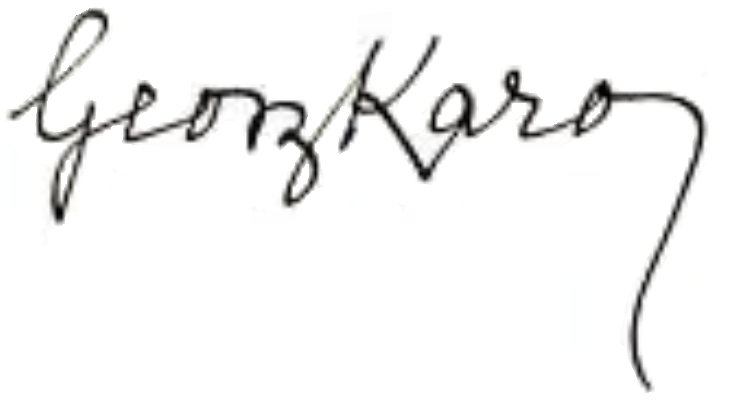

Georg Heinrich Karo (11 January 1872 – 12 November 1963) was a German archaeologist who specialised in Mycenaean and Etruscan civilisation. He was twice director of the German Archaeological Institute at Athens (DAI), in which capacity he excavated the Mycenaean site of Tiryns. A colleague of Wilhelm Dörpfeld, who had worked with Heinrich Schliemann at Troy, Karo published the findings from Schliemann's excavations of Grave Circle A at Mycenae. The work was considered Karo's greatest contribution to scholarship.

Karo was born into a prosperous merchant family; both of his parents were non-practising Jews, who raised him as a Protestant Christian. Initially inclined towards classical philology, he became interested in archaeology as a student of Georg Loeschcke at the University of Bonn. After earning his doctorate from Bonn in 1896, Karo travelled widely in the Mediterranean region, developing interests in Minoan civilisation, the Etruscans and ancient biblical commentaries. He taught at Bonn between 1902 and 1905, before moving to the DAI in Athens as Dörpfeld's deputy. Known for his urbane manner and fluency in several languages, he became well connected in the international circles of Greek archaeology, and maintained the favour of both the Greek and the German royal families. His outspoken German nationalism led to his dismissal from the DAI in 1916: he spent some time in the Ottoman Empire, where he worked to conserve cultural heritage and was linked with various efforts to appropriate ancient artefacts and bring them to Germany.

Karo's views made him unpopular with the Entente-backed government that ruled in Greece after the First World War, and he took an academic post in Germany at the University of Halle, which he held until 1930. That year, he returned to Athens as director of the DAI. Although an early supporter of the Nazi government of Germany, Karo was forced from his post in 1936 by antisemitism against his Jewish ancestry. In 1939, he fled to the United States, supported by American associates including Carl Blegen and Bert Hodge Hill, and obtained a series of visiting professorships at the University of Cincinnati, Oberlin College and Claremont Colleges. He was accused of collaborating with the Nazi regime: though no evidence for this allegation was found, he was denied US citizenship and listed as an "Enemy Alien". He returned to Germany in 1952, and became an honorary professor at the University of Freiburg.

== Early life ==
Georg Heinrich Karo was born in the Palazzo Barbaro, Venice. His father, Moritz, the son of a rabbi from Königsberg in der Neumark (now Chojna, Poland) in Western Pomerania, had built up a substantial fortune as a merchant in Berlin and served as honorary consul to Austria-Hungary. (Note: Schwingenstein 1977, p. 280; Matz 1964, p. 638 (for Karo's childhood and Moritz's fortune).) His mother, Helene Kuh, was Moritz's second wife and came from a Viennese family. Both of Karo's parents were non-practising Jews, and baptised their children as Protestant Christians; Karo remained a practising Protestant throughout his life. Karo lived in Berlin until the age of six, when his father, having lost his job through illness, moved the family to Florence, where Karo spent the remainder of his childhood. (Note: Schwingenstein 1977, p. 280; Matz 1964, p. 638 (for Karo's childhood and Moritz's fortune).) Until 1885, he was educated by private tutors, including Carl Schuchhardt, later known as a pioneer of prehistoric archaeology in Germany. He then attended the Berthold-Gymnasium in Freiburg, from which he graduated on 30 July 1890.

In the same year, Karo began studying classical philology and archaeology at the Ludwig-Maximilians-Universität München under the art historian Heinrich Wölfflin and the philologists Wilhelm von Christ and Ludwig Traube. (Note: Schwingenstein 1977, p. 280; Lindenlauf 2015, p. 263 (for Traube).) He initially specialised in classical philology, later writing in his memoirs that he found archaeology "completely foreign" and that he "only embarrassed himself" when attempting it. At the beginning of the 1892 winter term, he moved to the University of Bonn, where he studied under the classicist Franz Bücheler and the philologist Hermann Usener, but focused his studies in archaeology under Georg Loeschcke. Loeschcke held that the tradition of classical art should be traced to the Minoan and Mycenaean cultures of the second millennium BCE. Karo received his doctorate under him in 1896, with a thesis entitled De arte vascularia antiquissima quaestiones ("Inquiries into the Most Ancient Art of Vase Painting").

Following graduation in 1896, Karo moved to Rome, and spent the next six years on an extended study trip to Britain, France and the Mediterranean region, funded by his family wealth. In the winter of 1899–1900, he travelled along the Nile with his university friend, the Egyptologist Friedrich Wilhelm von Bissing. On the return journey, he visited Heraklion in Crete and met the British archaeologist Arthur Evans, the discoverer and excavator of the Minoan palace of Knossos. Karo later took part in Evans's excavations at Knossos, and the two became lifelong friends. (Note: Marinatos 2020, pp. 76–77; Schwingenstein 1977, p. 281 (for Karo's participation at Knossos).) He made his first visit to mainland Greece in 1900–1901. In Rome, he studied under the archaeologist Wolfgang Helbig and developed an interest in the culture of the Etruscans. During this period, Karo worked with the theologian Hans Lietzmann to produce the first catalogue of the known biblical catenae (commentaries composed entirely of excerpts from earlier commentaries), which was published in 1902. Most of Karo's early work, however, focused on Etruscan culture, particularly the connections between the Etruscans and classical Greece.

== Archaeological career ==
=== Early career and first period in Athens ===
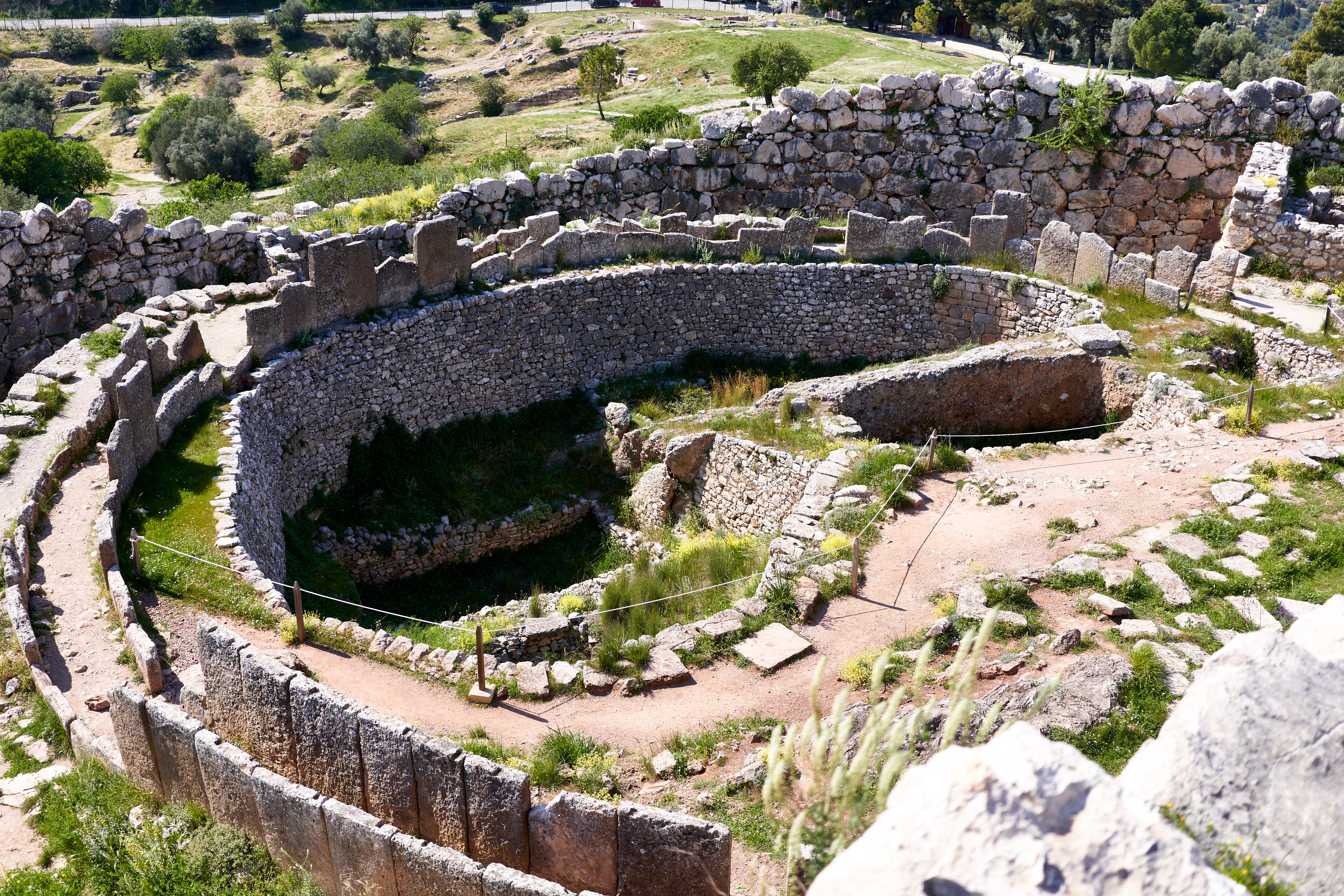
Grave Circle A at Mycenae, excavated by Heinrich Schliemann and Panagiotis Stamatakis in 1876–77: Karo published the finds from the site between 1912 and 1933.

In 1902, Karo was awarded his habilitation at Bonn, and moved there to teach as a Privatdozent (a "private lecturer" without the rights or status of a full professor). While in Bonn, he became acquainted with the family of the economic historian Eberhard Gothein and his wife Marie-Luise: Karo tutored their son, Percy, towards his Abitur (secondary-school final examinations). Through the Gothein family, he was introduced to the poet Stefan George. Karo moved in 1905 to Athens to take up a post, at Loeschcke's recommendation, as second secretary of the German Archaeological Institute at Athens (generally known as the "DAI", an abbreviation of Deutsches Archäologisches Institut, its name in German), deputising for Wilhelm Dörpfeld. (Note: Schwingenstein 1977, p. 280; Ehling 2019, p. 54 (for Loeschcke's recommendation).) He became editor of Athenische Mitteilungen ('News from Athens'), an archaeological journal published by the DAI, and held the position until 1924. From 1909, Dörpfeld, who had reached the pensionable age of fifty-five, abdicated most of his duties as director in order to focus on his own research into the works of Homer; Karo was generally acknowledged as the institute's main figure and de facto director from this point onwards. He turned down a post at the University of Giessen during this period. In response, the DAI submitted a request to Theobald von Bethmann Hollweg, the chancellor of Germany, that Karo be granted the title of professor; this was approved. Karo was given the director's title after Dörpfeld formally retired on 31 December 1911. He was made an officer of the Austrian Order of Franz Joseph shortly afterwards.

In Greece, Karo conducted archaeological excavations at Tiryns (from 1910, resuming earlier work by Schliemann). He also became closely connected with the German court of Wilhelm II, who became interested in Karo's work at Tiryns and whom Karo frequently visited at the Achilleion, the Kaiser's summer palace on Corfu. He was summoned there, along with Dörpfeld, to meet the Kaiser in June 1911. On his arrival on the island, Karo went straight to the excavation site of the Temple of Artemis, where he received an invitation to dinner at the palace: having dressed hurriedly in the car, he was seated next to the Kaiser. He was later present at excavations in the grounds of Mon Repos, a summer residence of the Greek royal family, in 1912: Wilhelm took part in those excavations, and Karo conducted research upon a relief slab unearthed by the Kaiser there in 1914.

In 1911, Karo secured 10,000 marks (Note: Roughly equivalent to $2,500 at the time, or $79,000 in 2022.) from Wilhelm towards the DAI's budget, which he justified to the Kaiser as an essential means of ensuring German "national prestige" through establishing parity with Greece's other foreign archaeological schools. Karo maintained close relations with the directors of these institutes, particularly Maurice Holleaux of the French School, Bert Hodge Hill of the American School, and Alan Wace of the British School at Athens (BSA). He also took part in a tradition at the BSA, under the 1900–1906 directorate of Robert Carr Bosanquet, of comic lectures delivered on winter evenings: he attended in drag, while other members of the DAI came dressed as statues.

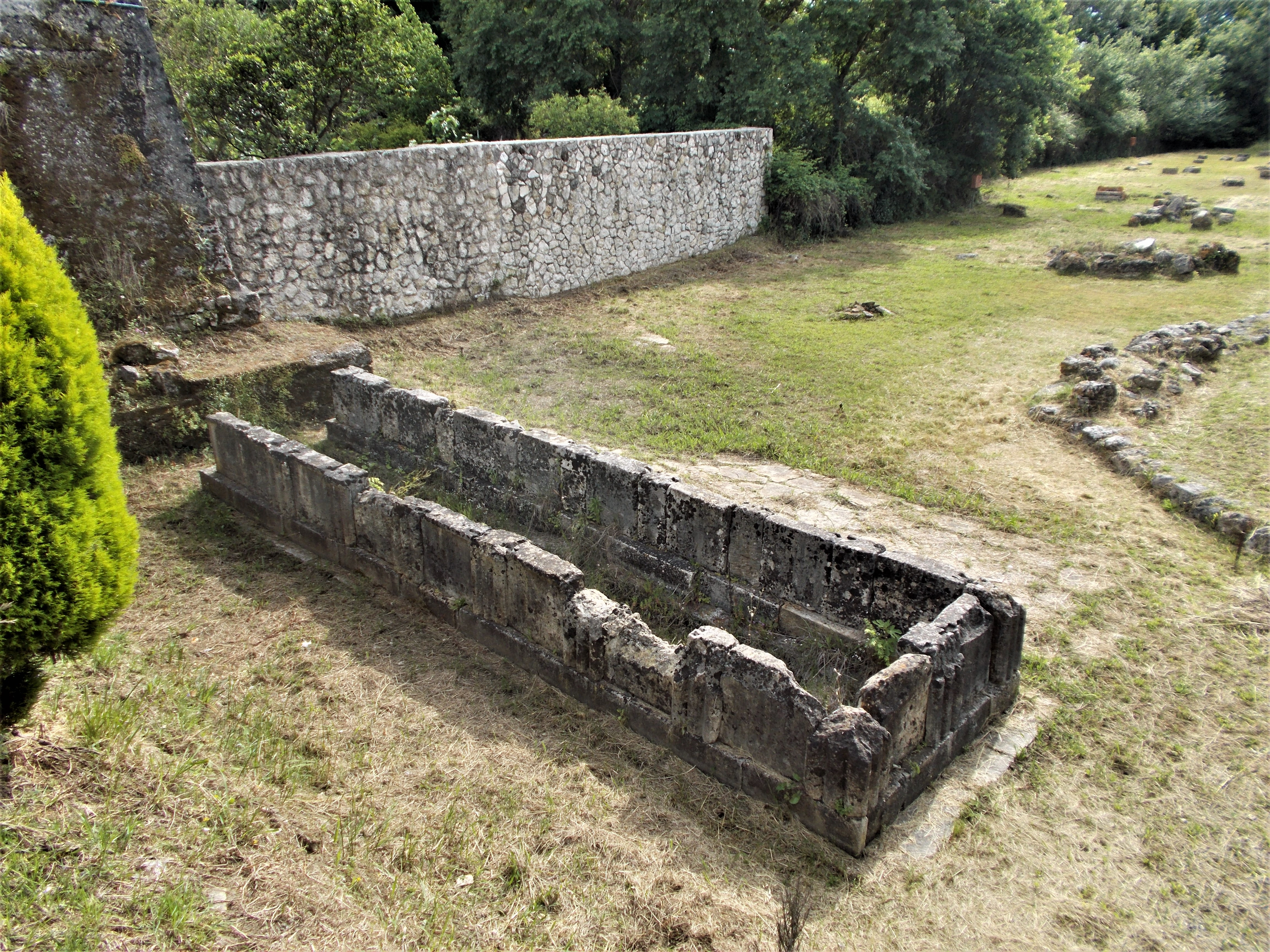
The altar of the Temple of Artemis on Corfu: Karo attended excavations at the site in 1911.

Karo became a favourite of Sophia of Prussia, Wilhelm II's sister, who married Constantine I to become Queen of Greece in 1913. During the First Balkan War of 1912–1913, Karo offered the unused first floor of the DAI's building as a hospital for wounded Greek officers; this service was recognised with the appointment as a Commander of the Order of the Redeemer, Greece's highest order of merit, in 1915. Around 1912, Loeschcke arranged for Karo to take on the publication of the results of the excavation of Grave Circle A at Mycenae – the excavations had been carried out by Heinrich Schliemann and Panagiotis Stamatakis between 1876 and 1877, but only partial publications of them had thus far been made. Karo's work was delayed by the outbreak of the First World War in 1914, but he prepared part of his preliminary survey for the 1915 volume of Athenische Mitteilungen, and sent proof-sheets of it to the British archaeologist Arthur Evans in the same year. The project would not be fully published until 1933, and was later described as Karo's greatest contribution to scholarship. Karo's work established the chronological relationships of the finds from Grave Circle A, and therefore allowed the beginning of the systematic study of Mycenaean material culture.

=== First World War ===
During the First World War, Karo remained in Athens and worked to oppose the strong anti-German sentiment prevalent in the Greek press and popular opinion. He edited a pro-German magazine and argued against the so-called "atrocity propaganda" spread by the Allies about Germany and its Ottoman allies. In a chance meeting with Wace on Christmas Day (25 December) 1914, Karo avowed that he would remain a member of the BSA and continue the honorary memberships of Britons at the DAI, but that the DAI's official relationship with the BSA, as well as his personal relations with Wace and other British archaeologists, would be "in abeyance" until the end of the war. He similarly ended his friendly correspondence with Holleaux of the French School: after 1914, the next documented contact between the DAI and the French School was in 1974, after Karo's death. Between 1914 and 1916, the German Foreign Office's newly created Office for Propaganda occupied rooms in the DAI, and Karo provided them with assistance, particularly working as a translator.

Shortly before Christmas 1915, excavators at Tiryns uncovered a cauldron filled with precious items, including a fifteenth-century BCE Minoan signet ring, deposited in the foundations of a house in the site's "Lower Town" during the LH IIIC period (c. 1180 BCE, after the destruction of the site in the late Bronze Age). Karo was not present for the discovery (known as the "Tiryns Treasure"); it was initially excavated by the Greek archaeologist Apostolos Arvanitopoulos, who was stationed in the region as a reserve officer of the Hellenic Army and who invited Karo to return and study the finds with him. Karo further excavated the find-spot in September 1916: he interpreted the discovery as loot piled up by tomb-robbers. This view was immediately and almost universally accepted in the archaeological community, though further study in the late twentieth and early twenty-first centuries has suggested that the assemblage was created as either an attempt to conceal valuable goods or a ritual deposition of them.

In late 1916, the DAI's Athens branch was taken under the control of the Greek Ministry of Education, following pressure from France and from anti-monarchist Venizelist elements within Greece. Karo was removed from his post as director, despite the objections of Queen Sophia, though most of his subordinates remained in their roles. The institute's administration was taken over by the Greek archaeologist Konstantinos Kourouniotis. In May 1917, Karo travelled to the Ottoman Empire to assist the archaeologist Martin Schede in preserving ancient monuments, though he was believed by the Ottomans to be involved in attempting to secure ancient artefacts for illicit export to Germany. He complained that the rapid development of infrastructure by the Ottoman army frequently destroyed ancient sites, and that neither he nor the army itself could prevail upon the soldiers to preserve archaeological remains. In July, he was connected to a plan by the German embassy in Constantinople, led by the ambassador Richard von Kühlmann, to establish a Kulturgeschichtliches Institut ('Institute of Cultural History') to take over the administration of Turkish archaeology and remove the legal barriers to the acquisition of antiquities from the Ottoman Empire by German museums. Karo was rebuked by Ulrich von Wilamowitz-Moellendorff, considered among the most respected of Germany's classicists, and forced to leave Turkey; he departed for a holiday in Switzerland.

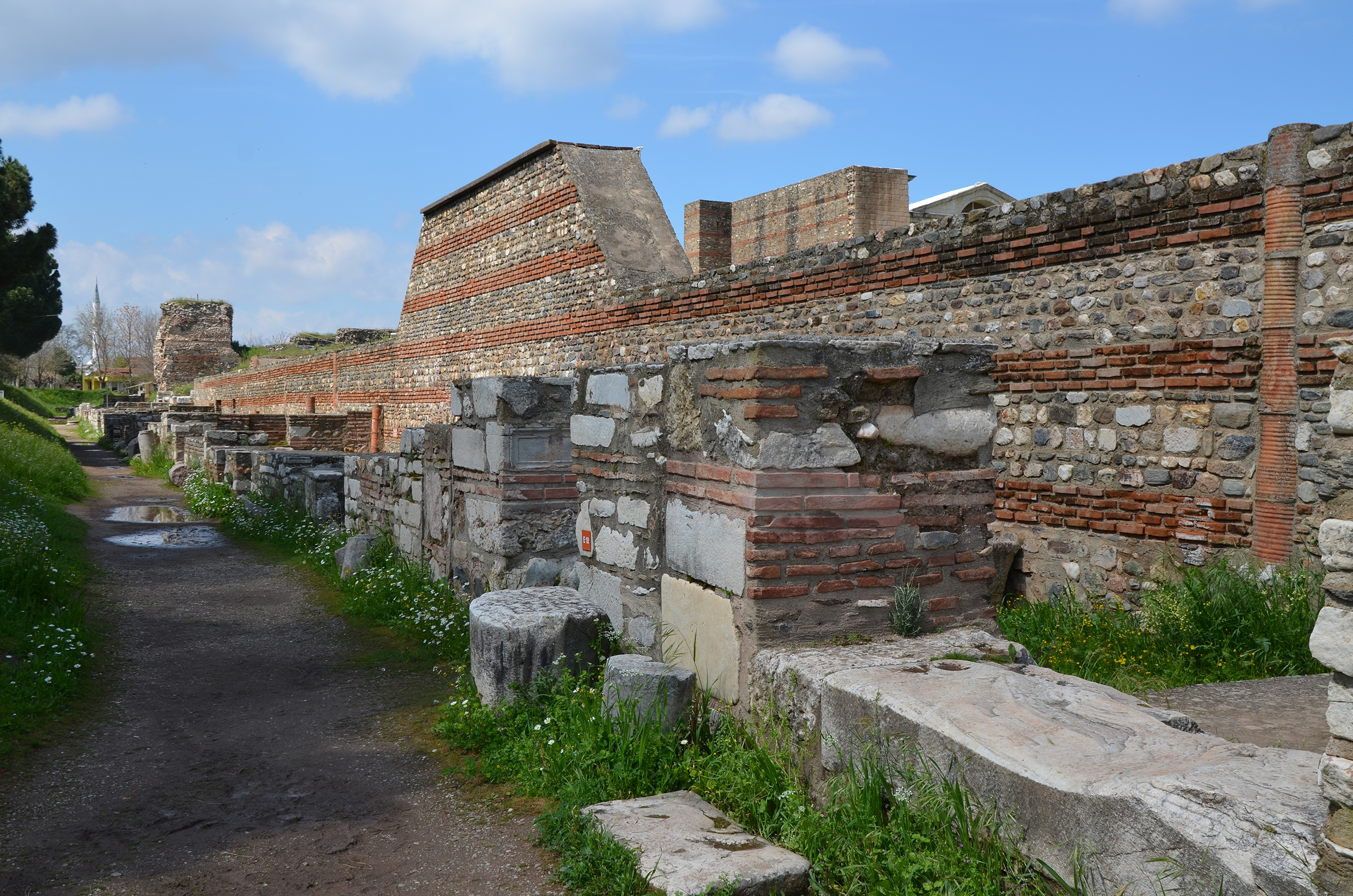
Byzantine remains at Sardis, photographed in 2015

Towards the end of the war, amid growing tensions between Greece and the Ottoman Empire over the status of western Anatolia, Karo was asked by Halil Edhem, the director of the Imperial Museum in Constantinople, to visit the ancient site of Sardis along with another archaeologist, Hubert Knackfuss, and to assess the veracity of reports that Ottoman forces had vandalised the ruins and excavations there. The two arrived on 21 June 1918 and reported that the site was largely undamaged, though they packed several trunks of archaeological finds and the personal property of the site's American excavators and had them transported away for safekeeping. This proved prescient, as the site would be severely damaged during the Greco-Turkish War, which began the following year. Karo was suspected by the Ottoman authorities of being in Turkey to spy on the situation of the Greek-speaking population of the eastern Aegean region. The art historian Wilhelm von Bode, curator of the Berlin museums, proposed to Karo that he steal a fifth-century BCE sarcophagus from Sidon and take it back to the Berlin museums as recompense for the Ottoman Empire's unpaid war debts: however, Theodor Wiegand, director of the museums' antiquities department, heard about the plan and ensured that it was not carried out. In the summer of 1920, Karo visited the excavations of Mycenae as a guest of Alan Wace.

=== Early interbellum years ===
The Greek state retained possession of the DAI's premises in Athens after the end of the war in November 1918: part of the building had been turned into a girls' school. During a meeting with the exiled Greek royal family and other Greek political figures in Switzerland in 1920, Karo had been informed that he would be expected to remain politically neutral on his return to the DAI. It was also suggested that Karo should not return, at least at first, as director, given his pro-German wartime activities: France had overthrown the pro-German government of Constantine I in June 1917, and the Venizelist government, with the new king Alexander, was considered a puppet of the Entente powers. Accordingly, in July 1920, Karo formally wrote to the directors of the DAI in Berlin, requesting to be dismissed from his post in Athens and complaining about the Greek government's treatment of him.

In the winter term of 1920, Karo took up the role of professor of archaeology at the University of Halle in Germany, succeeding Carl Robert and also taking Robert's place in the central directorate of the German Archaeological Institute in Berlin. In January 1921 and December 1922, he had two meetings with Stefan George to discuss his former tutee, Percy Gothein, by then a member of George's literary coterie and having difficulties in his academic studies. (Note: Karo later described his conversations with George as "one of the deepest impressions of my life".) In 1922, Karo met the novelist Helene Wenck, the daughter of the historian Karl Wenck, and a great-niece of Heinrich Schliemann. She was then working as a secretary at Halle, and like Karo published articles in the Süddeutsche Monatshefte, a conservative magazine opposed to the Weimar government then ruling in Germany. (Note: Lindenlauf 2015, p. 273. For Wenck's novels, see Ehling 2020.) From 1922, Karo contributed articles on Minoan and Mycenaean archaeology to the Pauly–Wissowa encyclopaedia of classical scholarship. However, his publications in his early years in Halle were dominated by political tracts, arguing against the Treaty of Versailles and denying claims of Germany's guilt for the start of the First World War. (Note: See § Political views below.)

Around 1924, Karo was a member of the acquisition committee of Athens's National Archaeological Museum, in which capacity he successfully argued against their acquisition of the so-called "Ring of Nestor", a purportedly Minoan artefact that Karo believed to be a forgery. In 1926, he travelled to western Crete with his former student Spyridon Marinatos, following a promise of 100,000 marks (Note: According to estimates by the Deutsche Bundesbank, this would be worth approximately €450,000 in 2024 prices.) from the German-American businessman Gustav Oberlaender for renewed German excavations in Greece; the money was eventually exhausted on excavations in the Kerameikos cemetery of Athens. Karo remained in Halle until 1930, (Note: Ridgway 2015, p. 629; Schwingenstein 1977, p. 280 (for Karo's professorial title).) when he returned to Athens as director of the DAI. Helene Wenck moved with him as his secretary. During this period, Karo served as editor of the Archäologischer Anzeiger ('Archaeological Gazette'), the DAI's bulletin of research and excavation.

=== Nazi period ===
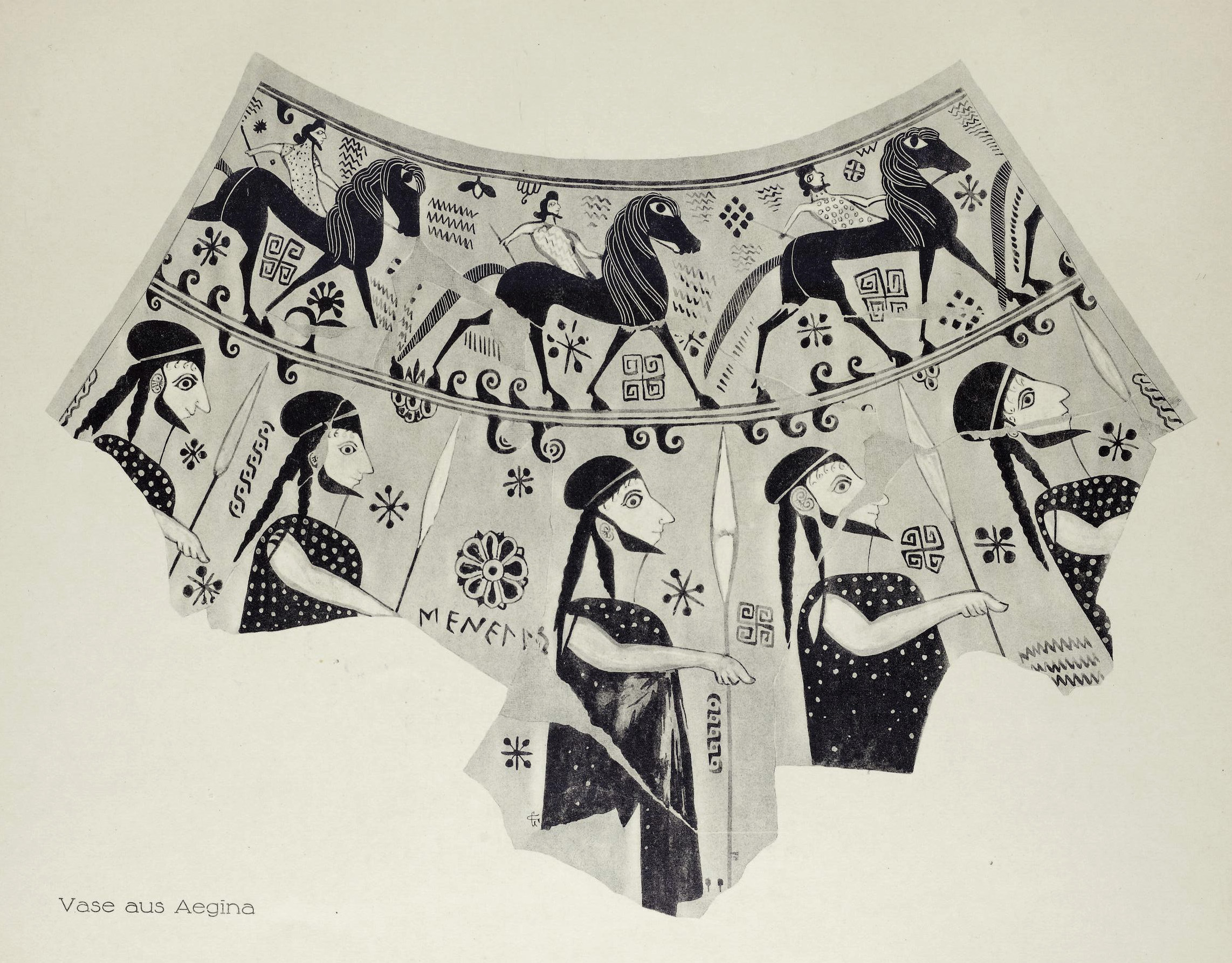
Line drawing of part of the "Menelas Stand", once owned by Karo and acquired in 1936 by the Berlin Antikensammlung

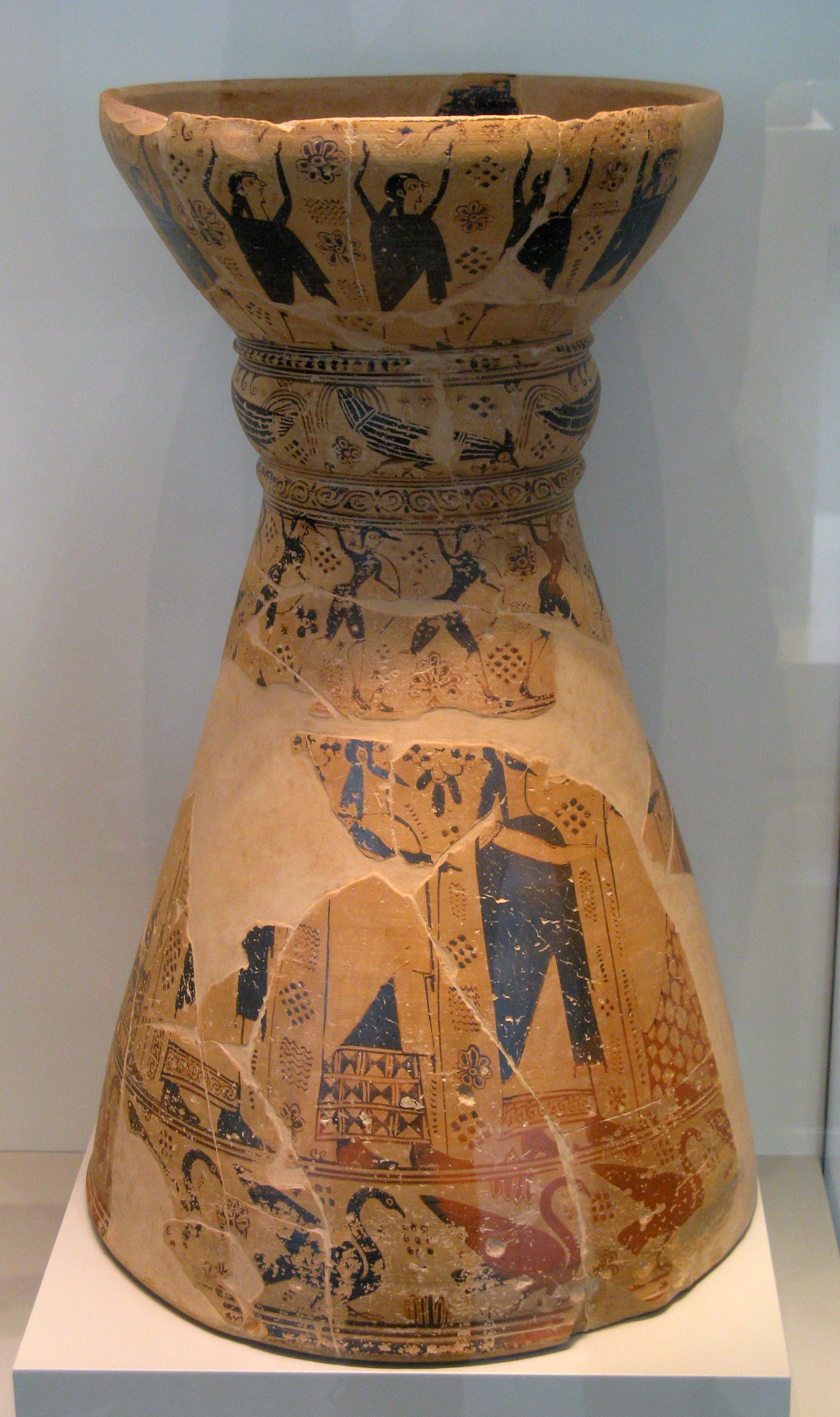
Complete example of a similar stand, also from Karo's collection and also in the Antikensammlung. Both stands were made on Aegina and are attributed to the Polyphemos Painter.

In September 1932, Karo was suggested as a potential candidate for the presidency of the central DAI in Berlin. The outgoing president, Gerhart Rodenwaldt, urged against his appointment on the grounds that a Jewish president could be a political liability if the Nazi Party were to gain power, and Karo declined to stand. When the Nazis acquired control of Germany in 1933, they made an early priority of excluding those deemed racially undesirable, including Jews and those married to or associated with them, from academic posts. Karo was one of several figures in German classical archaeology, including Ludwig Curtius, the head of the German Archaeological Institute at Rome, to be removed from office under Nazi racial laws. Karo resigned as chair of the DAI's board in 1933, fearing that his Jewish ancestry would be used against the institute. He offered his resignation as director, but the DAI's Berlin president, Theodor Wiegand, refused it.

In the spring of 1934, Karo acted as a guide to Hermann Göring, his future wife Emma Sonneman, and other high-ranking Nazi officials during their visit to Greece. Karo had planned to accompany them only for the first day, but Göring insisted that he remain with them for the whole week of the visit. In 1935, he again met Göring on the latter's honeymoon in Greece, and he went on to meet and entertain several other Nazi ministers during 1935–1936. In a letter of 1935 to his superiors in Berlin, Karo wrote that the DAI was working effectively, and that he was trying to "get rid of" his Jewish colleagues, who he wrote were damaging the "uniform, clean atmosphere" of the institute. He was ordered to leave the directorship in November 1935, though the order was quickly amended to allow him to serve until 31 March 1936. After extensive political wrangling between Karo, the DAI's officials in Athens and Berlin, and the German government, Karo left office at the end of September 1936. Also in 1936, Karo's collection of antiquities, including a large assemblage of Protoattic and Protocorinthian potsherds, including a vase-stand attributed to the seventh-century BCE Polyphemos Painter, passed into the hands of the Berlin Antikensammlung. (Note: Morris 1984, p. 5; Kästner 2014, p. 108 (for Karo's ownership of the collection). For an inventory of its contents, see "Sammlung Karo" [Karo Collection]. Heidelberg Accession Index (in German). Staatliche Museen zu Berlin. Karo published the stand in Karo 1928.)

Karo moved to Munich, where he lived with his stepsister. Wenck moved into the same house, but lived in a separate apartment. He remained in contact with the DAI, both in Athens and Berlin, and was consulted in 1937 by the Reich Ministry of Science, Education and Culture about the salaries of DAI employees in Athens. From 22 May until 4 June, he worked with Carl Blegen, his long-time friend from the ASCSA, on the latter's excavations at Troy. He corresponded about the finds with his former colleague Kurt Bittel, who arranged for Karo to be accommodated at the DAI. During this period, Karo applied unsuccessfully, with support from the DAI, for the status of Reichsbürger ('Reich citizen'). He was also made an honorary doctor of the University of Athens in 1937, as part of its centenary celebrations. He worked as a writer in Munich, but returned to Athens for study in 1938. Shortly afterwards, Wenck was denied access to an archive of Schliemann's papers by the researcher Ernst Meyer, and was subsequently forced to withdraw from a contract to write a biography of Schliemann; she alleged that Meyer had discriminated against her because she was in a relationship with the Jewish-born Karo. (Note: Meyer later denied the allegations, though Lindenlauf considers them likely to have been true.) By the end of 1938, the publication of several of Karo's works had been cancelled, in line with Nazi laws prohibiting the publication of works by Jews.

Karo maintained close connections with archaeologists, particularly from Britain and the United States, throughout his career. He made a particular impression upon Ida Thallon Hill, the wife of Bert Hodge Hill. Ida wrote in 1900 that Karo was "more like an Englishman" than a German and was "a great ladies' man". (Note: Letter from Hill to her mother, 13 May 1900, quoted in Vogeikoff-Brogan 2020.) Most archaeologists from the Entente powers in Athens had cut off their association with their German colleagues during the First World War – Zillah Dinsmoor, the wife of the American architectural historian William Bell Dinsmoor, refused Karo's invitation to dinner shortly after the sinking of the Lusitania in 1917, ending the friendship between Karo and her husband. However, Karo's friends Blegen and Hill continued to associate with him and to attend lectures at the DAI, often as the only non-Germans in the audience. In January 1936, the "Quartet" (Note: The name used by Blegen and Hill for the arrangement by which they lived together with their respective wives, Elizabeth Pierce Blegen and Ida Thallon Hill, who maintained a long-term relationship.) of Blegen, Hill and their wives hosted a birthday party for Karo at their house at 9 Ploutarchou Street, intended as a gesture of support in the light of Karo's imminent dismissal: the guests included the American ambassador to Greece, Lincoln MacVeigh, as well as the Anglo-Dutch artist Piet de Jong, who gave Karo a caricature of him holding a Mycenaean kylix.

==== Exile in the United States ====
From 1938, Karo planned to leave Germany permanently: he later stated that he had intended to leave in September, but was required to remain to care for his elderly stepsister. She died on 19 December; Karo applied for a Greek visa early in 1939 in the hope of being able to pass from there to the United States as a refugee. He was supported by the Greek royal family, who allowed him to bypass the general refusal of the Greek government to issue visas to Austrian and German Jews. He left Germany for Greece on 30 June, and was briefly detained by the Gestapo at the Italian border. By 1 July, he was in Florence, where he met George II of Greece as well as Wenck, who had emigrated separately. On 12 July, Karo attended Wace's sixtieth birthday party at Mycenae alongside several noted Greek and American archaeologists. On 27 September, he and Wenck sailed from Greece, and arrived on 11 October in New York. Karo obtained his American visa through the support of friends at the ASCSA, particularly Blegen and Hill. He first took up a visiting professorship at the University of Cincinnati, which he obtained through the assistance of Blegen, a professor at the same institution. Karo's arrival in Cincinnati was welcomed by the university faculty: friends there provided money to help him with living costs.

Karo married Helene Wenck on 24 April 1940. That same month, he applied for US citizenship. (Note: Davis 2010, p. 141; Lindenlauf 2015, p. 313 (for the month).) Karo left Cincinnati in 1940 and taught as a visiting professor at Oberlin, also in Ohio. (Note: Stewart 2021, p. 15; Davis 2010, p. 140 (for the year).) Once again, his friends at Cincinnati sent money to help with his expenses; the Blegens contributed most of his first year's salary. At Oberlin, he taught a course on the legacy of ancient Greece and Rome, in which he devoted the majority of his focus to Greece: this included reading from the Iliad to his students in the original Homeric Greek, out of the belief that the poetry could never be fully appreciated in translation. He delivered the eight 1941 and 1942 Charles Beebe Martin Classical Lectures at Oberlin, the first series of which were published as his monograph Greek Personality in Archaic Sculpture in 1948. The archaeologist Jack Davis has judged that Karo's presence ultimately had little impact upon his primary field of Aegean prehistory in the United States.

==== Accusations of espionage ====
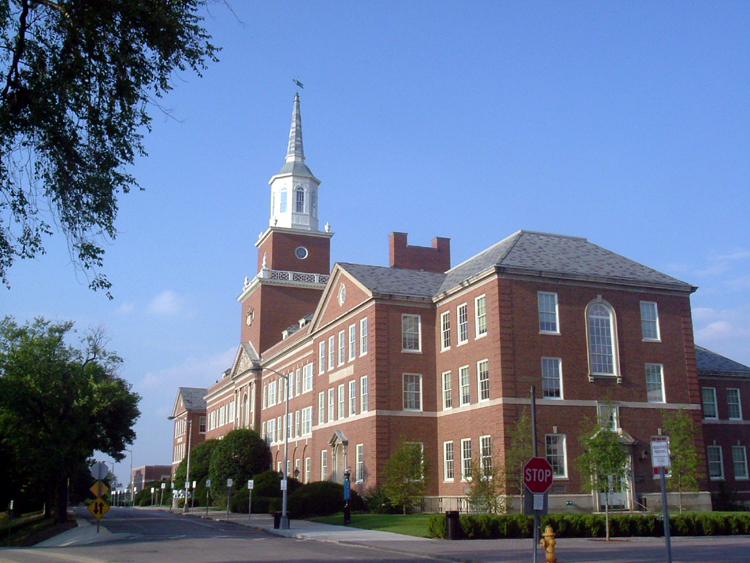
The Arts and Sciences Hall (formerly McMicken Hall) of the University of Cincinnati, where Karo taught following his arrival in the US in 1939

From his arrival in the United States, Karo was accused of working or spying for the Nazi government. During Karo's year at Cincinnati, his former student Spyridon Marinatos undertook a lecture tour of the US: Marinatos was unable to speak at Cincinnati owing to a bout of pneumonia, which left him hospitalised for a week. Unable to meet Marinatos in person, Karo sent him a letter containing eleven postcards, all showing an image of the Penn Museum and inscribed with a short greeting, signed pseudonymously "George Barbour". Karo asked Marinatos to send these from Greece to eight addresses in Germany and three in Prague, which had recently been annexed by the Nazi Germany. Unsure of Karo's intentions, Marinatos gave the letters to his benefactor Elizabeth Humlin Hunt, in whose home he had been staying, to dispose of: she handed them to the Federal Bureau of Investigation (FBI), and further claimed to have been told by Harry A. Hill, director of the American Express office in Athens, that Karo had received money from the Nazi government while in the city. Harry A. Hill's father-in-law, the philologist Edward Capps, was a personal enemy of Karo's friends Blegen and Hill: Capps denounced Karo to the FBI as "dangerous to the security of the United States". Meanwhile, T. Leslie Shear, the director of the ASCSA's excavations in the Athenian agora, accused Karo of having been an agent for Germany during the First World War, an accusation repeated by the classicist Daniel Lewis. The classicist John Franklin Daniel accused Karo of being a sleeper agent for Germany in the US.

An Ohio district attorney sought to arrest Karo: his warrant was refused by the US Attorney General, but Karo was subpoenaed to testify in court in 1941. No evidence was found to connect him with the Nazi regime, and the record of the trial categorised the case against him as "fairly flimsy". He was nevertheless placed under parole, denied US citizenship, and labelled a "Nazi" in the official records of the affair. He was also required to testify before an Enemy Alien Hearing Board in Cleveland on 18 April 1942 to avoid internment, something that he wrote would be "a death sentence" at his advanced age. (Note: Marinatos 2020, p. 184; Lindenlauf 2015, p. 262 (for the date).) His parole was lifted on 15 November 1945, but he remained ineligible for American citizenship and retained the official status of "Enemy Alien" until the end of 1946. (Note: Davis 2010, p. 141; Lindenlauf 2015, p. 316 (for "Enemy Alien" status).) The affair caused him to abandon his planned return to Cincinnati, on the advice of William Semple, head of the university's classics department.

=== Return to Germany ===
After the end of his contract at Oberlin, Karo lived until 1945 largely on support from the Oberlaender Foundation, which funded the expenses of several German academics living as refugees in the United States. He received a scholarship from the Archaeological Institute of America in 1944–1945, and was also supported by donations from friends. Nevertheless, the Karo family's wealth declined considerably over their time in the US. Karo took a visiting lectureship at the University of Kansas City in 1945, after the end of the Second World War in September, but generally lived in Oberlin until the summer of 1947. During the 1947–1948 academic year, he taught at the University of Iowa; in 1948, he took a one-year post at Claremont Colleges in California. His salary at Claremont was $40 per month, less than that paid to a typical lecturer, and barely enough to meet his living costs. His contract was extended each year until 1952, thanks to pressure on the college's president exerted by Karo's students; Karo also served as head of Claremont's classics department. His wife Helene acted as his research and teaching assistant.

On the occasion of his eightieth birthday in January 1952, he received congratulations from Konrad Adenauer, chancellor of West Germany. He applied to be recognised as a victim of Nazi persecution, which would entitle him to government support as well as a resumption of his pension as an employee of the DAI: his application was accepted late in 1952 after Adenauer's personal intervention. Dissatisfied with life in America, Karo returned to Germany on 9 July 1952. Shortly afterwards, he was awarded the Knight Commander's Cross of the Order of Merit of the Federal Republic of Germany. In 1954, he was made an honorary professor at the University of Freiburg, probably at the instigation of Walter-Herwig Schuchhardt, a professor at the university and the son of Karo's childhood teacher.

In addition to his native German and Italian, Karo spoke English, French and Modern Greek. In his memoirs, which he published in 1959, Karo chose only to discuss his life until the early 1930s, leaving out any mention of his relationship with the Nazi government, of his persecution in Germany, or of subsequent events. He died in Freiburg im Breisgau on 12 November 1963.

== Political views ==
Karo held strong German nationalist views. In September 1919, Karo contributed an article to the Süddeutsche Monatshefte magazine demanding the revision of the Treaty of Versailles. In May 1921, he wrote again in the Monatshefte, including a suggestion that Germany's "most dangerous enemies" were "not outside, but inside" the country, a claim which the historian Michael Brenner has connected with the growth in the antisemitic stab-in-the-back myth and in hostility towards Jewish academics in Germany. In 1921, Karo wrote a book criticising the terms of the Treaty of Versailles, denying claims of Germany's guilt for the start of the war, and attacking British imperialism. He was called to testify before a district court in Munich in spring 1922 on the question of German war guilt; this appearance gained him international recognition as one of the foremost experts on the subject.

Karo's biographer Astrid Lindenlauf has written that he was "fond of the radical right", and that he was a member of the right-wing German Lecturers' Association (Deutschnationaler Dozentenbund) for several years, giving speeches at the group's annual meetings until 1929. He also taught part-time at the Hochschule für nationale Politik in Berlin, which promulgated a nationalist, anti-democratic ideology; it was run by the historian Martin Spahn, later an early member of the Nazi Party. During his leadership of the DAI during Nazi rule, Karo attempted to avoid recruiting so-called "non-Aryans" and wrote of his efforts to drive out Jewish archaeologists; however, he also favoured and supported the Jewish-born Wulf Schäfer, and recommended him for archaeological posts outside Germany.

In 1932, Ludwig Curtius wrote that Karo "belong[ed] neither wholly to archaeology nor to politics", which Lindenlauf has interpreted as an indication of the importance of the political aspects of his role in German archaeology. During a visit to Athens in September 1933, the German archaeologist Rudolf Herzog recorded in his diary that Karo and his colleagues at the DAI approved of the recent rise of Adolf Hitler to power in Germany. During his time in the United States, Karo told colleagues that he had been an early supporter of the Nazis, but found life under their rule "increasingly unbearable". The DAI became known for its support of the Nazi state, and Karo hoped that the new regime would bring about renewed excavations at Olympia, which indeed began in 1936. In 1941, Karo boasted of having personally secured the funding for these excavations in a meeting with Hitler. Notes taken by Bert Hodge Hill record that Karo was critical of Hitler's invasion of Poland in September 1939. In his memoirs, Karo condemned Hitler and described the Second World War as a "meaningless enterprise".

== Published works ==
- Karo, Georg (1908). "Die tyrsenische Stele von Lemnos" [The Etruscan Stele from Lemnos]. Mittheilungen des Kaiserlich Deutschen Archaeologischen Instituts, Athenische Abteilung (in German). 33: 48–74. ISSN 1105-1116.
- — (1915). Führer durch die Ruinen von Tiryns [Guide to the Ruins of Tiryns] (in German). Athens: German Archaeological Institute. OCLC 938414635.
- — (1925). Religion des ägäischen Kreises [Religion of the Aegean Region] (in German). Leipzig: Scholl. OCLC 2415423.
- — (1928). "Menelaos auf einer frühattischen Vase" [Menelaos on an Early Attic Vase]. Hallisches Winckelmannsprogramm (in German). 26: 10–14.
- — (1930–1933). Die Schachtgräber von Mykenai [The Shaft Graves of Mycenae] (in German). Munich: F. Bruckmann. OCLC 977681680.
- — (1943). An Attic Cemetery: Excavations in the Kerameikos at Athens under Gustav Oberlaender and the Oberlaender Trust. Philadelphia: Oberlaender Trust. OCLC 615023.
- — (1948). Greek Personality in Archaic Sculpture. Cambridge, MA: Harvard University Press. OCLC 0837131154.
- — (1954). Zwei etruskische Wundervögel aus dem 8./7. Jahrhundert [Two Etruscan Wundervögel of the 8th/7th Century] (in German). Baden-Baden: Bruno Grimm. OCLC 926971571.
- — (1959). Greifen am Thron: Erinnerungen an Knossos [Griffins at the Throne: Recollections of Knossos] (in German). Baden-Baden: Grimm. OCLC 645013.
- — (1959). Fünfzig Jahre aus dem Leben eines Archäologen [Fifty Years in the Life of an Archaeologist] (in German). Baden-Baden: Grimm. OCLC 560606644.

== Bibliography ==
- Altekamp, Stefan (2017). "Classical Archaeology in Nazi Germany". In Roche, Helen; Demetriou, Kyriakos N. (eds.). Brill's Companion to the Classics, Fascist Italy and Nazi Germany. Leiden: Brill. pp. 289–324. ISBN 978-90-04-29906-1.
- Auslebrook, Stephanie (2022). "The Impact of Archaeological Recording on the Study of Metal Artefacts: Mycenae 1939: A Case Study". The Annual of the British School at Athens. 117: 415–455. doi:10.1017/S0068245422000016.
- "Bekanntmachungen" [Announcements] (PDF). Bundesanzeiger [Federal Gazette] (in German). 4 (149): 1. 5 August 1952. ISSN 0344-7634.
- Brenner, Michael (2020). In Hitler's Munich: Jews, the Revolution, and the Rise of Nazism. Princeton University Press. ISBN 978-0-691-19103-4.
- Burgeon, Christophe (2017). "Les fouilles allemandes à Olympie, 1936–1937: Un prétexte scientifique, une instrumentation idéologique" [The German Excavations at Olympia, 1936–1937: A Scientific Pretext and an Ideological Instrumentation]. Bulletin de l'Institut Pierre Renouvin (in French). 46 (2): 31–44. doi:10.3917/bipr1.046.0031. ISSN 1775-4305.
- Clogg, Richard (1979). "The Greek Government-in-Exile 1941–4". The International Historical Review. 1 (3): 376–398. doi:10.1080/07075332.1979.9640190. ISSN 0707-5332. JSTOR 40105020.
- Clogg, Richard (2009). "Academics at War: The British School at Athens During the First World War". In Llewellyn Smith, Michael; Kitromilides, Paschalis M.; Calligas, Eleni (eds.). Scholars, Travels, Archives: Greek History and Culture through the British School at Athens. British School at Athens Studies. Vol. 17. London: The British School at Athens. pp. 163–177. ISBN 978-0-904887-60-0. JSTOR 40960681.
- Davis, Jack L. (2010). "'That Special Atmosphere Outside of National Boundaries': Three Jewish Directors and the American School of Classical Studies at Athens". Annuario della Scuola Archeologica Italiana di Atene. 87: 133–145. ISSN 0067-0081.
- Dyson, Stephen (2006). In Pursuit of Ancient Pasts: A History of Classical Archaeology in the Nineteenth and Twentieth Centuries. New Haven: Yale University Press. ISBN 978-0-300-20499-5.
- Ehling, Kay (2019). "Archäeologe und Gentleman: Georg Karo in den Zwanziger Jahren" [Archaeologist and Gentleman: Georg Karo in the Twenties]. Antike Welt (in German). 6 (6): 53–60. ISSN 0003-570X. JSTOR 26918891.
- Ehling, Kay (12 October 2020). "Georg Karo – Archäeologe und Gentleman" [Georg Karo – Archaeologist and Gentleman]. Antike Welt & Archaeologie in Deutschland (in German).
- Ehling, Kay (2021). "Korfu: Insel der Gorgo: Neues zur Bedeutung des Giebels vom Artemistempel" [Corfu: Island of Gorgo: New Information on the Meaning of the Pediment of the Temple of Artemis]. Antike Welt (in German) (6): 56–65. ISSN 0003-570X. JSTOR 27230393.
- Fischer, Wolfgang Christian (2010). ""A Mark is Worth a Mark"". In Fischer, Wolfgang Christian (ed.). German Hyperinflation 1922/23: A Law and Economics Approach. Lohmer-Cologne: Eul. pp. 71–100. ISBN 978-3-89936-931-1.
- Fittschen, Klaus (1996). "L'École française d'Athènes et l'Institut archéologique allemand" [The French School at Athens and the German Archaeological Institute]. Bulletin de Correspondance Hellénique (in French). 120–121: 487–496. doi:10.3406/bch.1996.4612. ISSN 0007-4217.
- Florou, Vasiliki (2015). "The House at 9 Ploutarchou Street: A Grape Arbor and a Dense Shadow of Beautiful Meanings". In Vogeikoff-Brogan, Natalia; Davis, Jack; Florou, Vasiliki (eds.). Carl Blegen: Personal and Archaeological Narratives. Atlanta: Lockwood Press. pp. 121–146. ISBN 978-1-937040-23-9.
- French, Elizabeth (2015). "Και εἰς ἀνώτερα: The "Govs" in the 1930s". In Vogeikoff-Brogan, Natalia; Davis, Jack; Florou, Vasiliki (eds.). Carl Blegen: Personal and Archaeological Narratives. Atlanta: Lockwood Press. pp. 147–156. ISBN 978-1-937040-23-9.
- Gerber, Albrecht (2010). Deissmann the Philologist. Berlin: De Gruyter. ISBN 978-3-11-022431-3.
- Jones, Barry (2022). Dictionary of World Biography. Acton: ANU Press. ISBN 978-1-76046-552-0.J
- Kankeleit, Alexandra (2023). "'Unrestricted Research Opportunities' with 'Unpleasant Surprises': German Archaeologists in Greece During the National Socialist Era". In Modl, Daniel; Nuijen, Erwin; Meheux, Katie; Eickhoff, Martijn (eds.). National-Socialist Archaeology in Europe and Its Legacies. Cham: Springer. pp. 257–280. ISBN 978-3-031-28024-5.
- Kästner, Ursula (2014). "Vom Einzelstück zum Fundkomplex: Eduard Gerhards und Robert Zahns Erwerbungen für das Berliner Museum" [From Single Find to Assemblage: The Acquisitions of Eduard Gerhard and Robert Zahn for the Berlin Museum]. In Schmidt, Stefan; Steinhart, Matthias (eds.). Sammeln und Erforschen: Griechische Vasen in neuzeitlichen Sammlungen [Collecting and Researching: Greek Vases in Modern Collections] (in German). Munich: Verlag C. H. Beck. pp. 103–114. ISBN 978-3-406-66400-7 – via Academia.edu.
- Layton, Richard A. (2019). "Catenae". In Blower, Paul M.; Martens, Peter William (eds.). The Oxford Handbook of Early Christian Biblical Interpretation. Oxford University Press. pp. 221–229. ISBN 978-0-19-871839-0.
- Lindenlauf, Astrid (2015). "Georg Heinrich Karo: Gelehrter und Verteidiger Deutschen Geistes'" [Georg Heinrich Karo: Scholar and Defender of the German Spirit]. Jahrbuch des Deutschen Archäologischen Instituts [Yearbook of the German Archaeological Institute] (in German). 130: 259–354. ISSN 2702-444X.
- Luke, Christina Marie (2019). A Pearl in Peril: Heritage and Diplomacy in Turkey. Oxford University Press. ISBN 978-0-190-49887-0.
- Lullies, Reinhard; Schiering, Wolfgang, eds. (1988). "Georg Karo". Archäologenbildnisse: Porträts und Kurzbiographien von Klassischen Archäologen deutscher Sprache [Archaeologists' Portraits: Portraits and Short Biographies of Classical Archaeologists of the German Language] (in German). Mainz: von Zabern. pp. 180–182.
- Maran, Joseph (2006). "Coming to Terms with the Past: Ideology and Power in Late Helladic IIIC". In Deger-Jalkotzy, Sigrid; Lemos, Irene S. (eds.). Ancient Greece: From the Mycenaean Palaces to the Age of Homer. Edinburgh University Press. pp. 123–150. ISBN 978-0-7486-1889-7.
- Marchand, Suzanne (1996). Down from Olympus: Archaeology and Philhellenism in Germany, 1750–1970. Princeton University Press. ISBN 978-0-691-11478-1.
- Marinatos, Nanno (2015). "On the Authenticity of the 'Minos Ring': Evidence from Spyridon Marinatos's Archives". In Panagiotopoulos, Diamantis (ed.). Ein Minoer im Exil: Festschrift für Wolf-Dietrich Niemeier [A Minoan in Exile: Festschrift for Wolf-Dietrich Niemeier]. Universitätsforschungen zur Prähistorischen Archäologie. Vol. 270. Bonn: Dr. Rudolf Habelt GmbH. pp. 271–280. ISBN 978-3-7749-3971-4.
- Marinatos, Nanno (2020). Sir Arthur Evans and Minoan Crete. London: Bloomsbury. ISBN 978-1-350-19735-0.
- Marinatos, Spyridon (1966). "Necrology". American Journal of Archaeology. 70 (1): 73–74. doi:10.1086/AJS501425. JSTOR 501425.
- Matz, Friedrich (September 1964). "Georg Karo †". Gnomon. 36 (6): 637–640. ISSN 0017-1417. JSTOR 27683484.
- Morris, Sarah P. (1984). The Black and White Style: Athens and Aigina in the Orientalizing Period. New Haven: Yale University Press. ISBN 0-300-03064-9 – via Internet Archive.
- Myres, John L (1930). "Review: Schachtgräber von Mykenai, by Georg Karo". Antiquity. 6 (22): 235–236. doi:10.1017/S0003598X00006773. ISSN 0003-598X.
- Pounder, Robert L. (2015). "The Blegens and the Hills: A Family Affair". In Vogeikoff-Brogan, Natalia; Davis, Jack; Florou, Vasiliki (eds.). Carl Blegen: Personal and Archaeological Narratives. Atlanta: Lockwood Press. pp. 85–98. ISBN 978-1-937040-23-9.
- Ridgway, David (2015). "Karo, Georg(e) (1872–1963)". In De Grummond, Nancy Thomson (ed.). Encyclopedia of the History of Classical Archaeology. Abingdon: Routledge. p. 629. ISBN 978-1-134-26861-0.
- Schlack, Stephan (2012). "Gothein, Percy". In Aurnhammer, Achim; Braungart, Wolfgang; Breuer, Stefan; Oelmann, Ute (eds.). Stefan George und sein Kreis: Ein Handbuch [Stefan George and His Circle: A Handbook] (in German). Berlin: De Gruyer. pp. 1387–1390. ISBN 978-3-11-026834-8.
- Schwingenstein, Christoph (1977). "Karo, Georg". In zu Stolberg-Wernigerode, Otto (ed.). Neue Deutsche Biographie (in German). Vol. 11. Berlin: Duncker & Humblot. pp. 280–281. ISBN 978-3-428-00280-1. (full text online).
- Stein, Oliver (2018). "Archaeology and Monument Protection in War: The Collaboration Between the German Army and Researchers in the Ottoman Empire, 1914–1918". In Horne, John; Clarke, Joseph (eds.). Militarized Cultural Encounters in the Long Nineteenth Century: Making War, Mapping Europe. Cham: Springer. pp. 297–318. ISBN 978-3-319-78229-4.
- Stewart, Geoffrey S. (2021). Norman R. Rich (1921–2020): An Appreciation. Lanham: Hamilton Books. ISBN 978-0-7618-7312-9.
- Vogeikoff-Brogan, Natalia (2015). "The Life of Carl W. Blegen from a Grass Roots Perspective". In Vogeikoff-Brogan, Natalia; Davis, Jack; Florou, Vasiliki (eds.). Carl Blegen: Personal and Archaeological Narratives. Atlanta: Lockwood Press. pp. 17–38. ISBN 978-1-937040-23-9.
- Vogeikoff-Brogan, Natalia (10 August 2020). "On the Trail of the "German Model": ASCSA and DAI, 1881–1918". From the Archivist's Notebook.
- Waterhouse, Helen (1986). "The British School at Athens: The First Hundred Years". Annual of the British School at Athens: Supplementary Volumes. 19 (19): 1–170. ISSN 1464-0813. JSTOR 40856005.
