= Blegen =

Blegen is a surname. Notable people with the surname include:

- Carl Blegen (1887–1971), American archaeologist, husband of Elizabeth
- Elizabeth Blegen (1888–1966), American archeologist, educator and writer, wife of Carl
- Judith Blegen (born 1943), American soprano
- Theodore C. Blegen (1891–1969), American historian and author
