= Gothein =

Gothein is a surname of German origin. Notable people with the surname include:

- Eberhard Gothein (1853–1923), German economist and historian
- Georg Gothein (1857–1940), German politician
- Marie-Luise Gothein (1863–1931), Prussian scholar, gardener and author
