= Ida Hill =

American archaeologist

Ida Thallon Hill
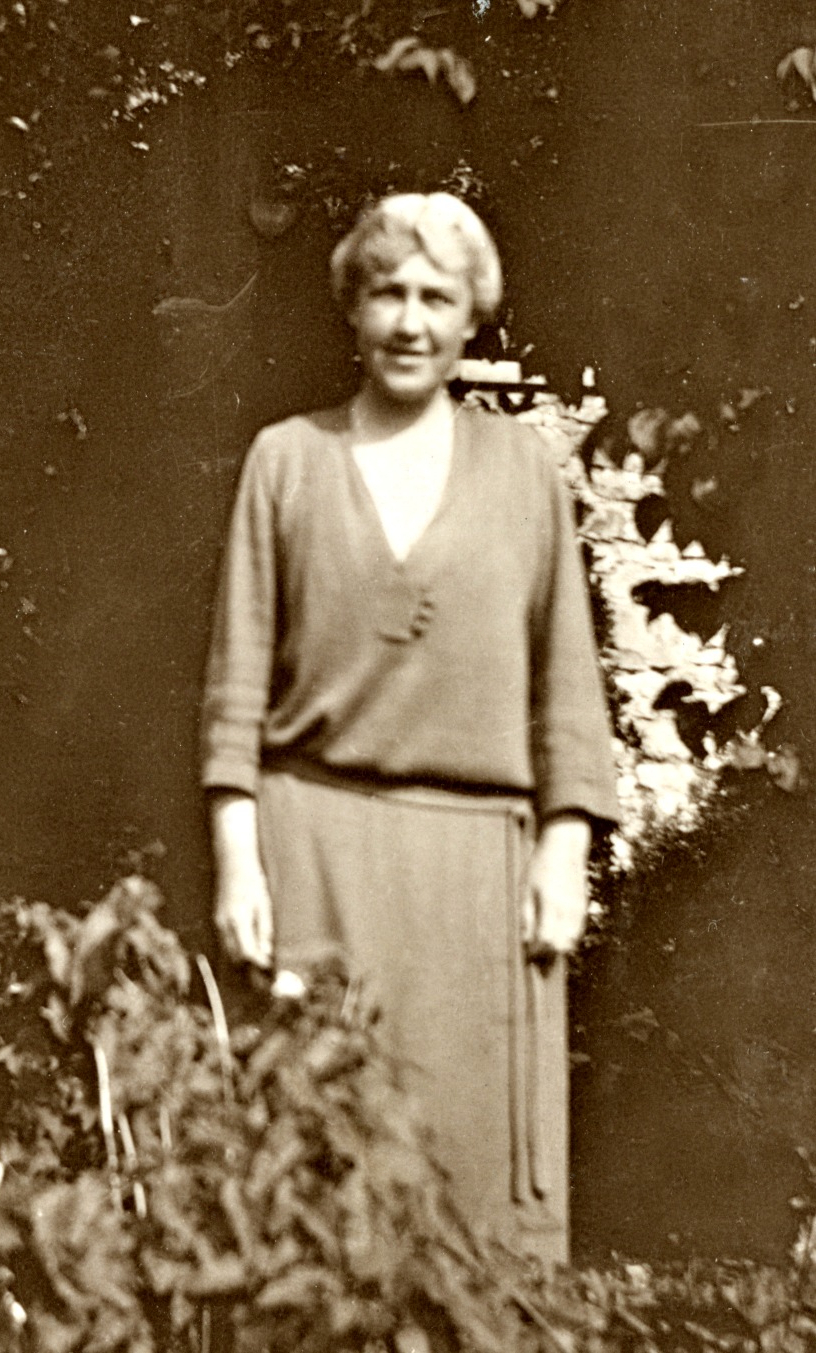
- Born: Ida Carleton Thallon; August 11, 1875; New York City, US
- Died: December 14, 1954 (aged 79); At sea (traveling home to Athens)
- Education: Packer Collegiate Institute; Vassar College; Columbia University
- Occupations: Archaeologist at Vassar College and American School of Classical Studies in Athens
- Notable work: Readings in Greek History, From Homer to the Battle of Cheronea; a Collection of Extractions from the Sources
- Spouse: Bert Hodge Hill (m. 1924–1954)
- Partners: Elizabeth Pierce Blegen, Carl Blegen

Ida Carleton Hill (née Thallon; August 11, 1875 – December 14, 1954) was an American archaeologist, classical scholar and historian. Hill had a strong interest in the relationship between history, geography, and archaeology, which was reflected in her research and publications over her fifty-year career.

== Early life and education ==
Ida Carleton Thallon was born on August 11, 1875, to John and Grace (Green) Thallon. She attended Packer Collegiate Institute for Girls in Brooklyn, New York. She obtained a Bachelor of Art Degree (AB) from Vassar College in 1897.

== Early archaeological and academic career ==
Hill attended the American School of Classical Studies in Athens from 1899 to 1901. Joining her at the school was fellow Vassar alumna Lida Shaw King. King and Hill were friends who travelled together for three months in Europe before starting classes. They would later collaborate on archaeological publications.

While at school, archaeologist Wilhelm Dörpfeld's lectures on the topography of Athens had a strong influence on Hill. She was also inspired by friend and fellow student Harriet Boyd. Boyd was a strong advocate for allowing women students to participate in excavations and was successful in gaining permission from the school director to excavate a site of her choosing.

In 1900 when Hill returned for her second year, school director Rufus Richardson offered King and Hill the publication of the terracottas from Corinth. They began this project together, but Hill completed the project twenty four years later. During this time in Athens, Hill also studied geometric vases for her Master's thesis at Vassar.

Hill's first experience of fieldwork was in February 1901, when she participated in the excavation at Vari Cave, Attica, under the direction of Charles Weller. Hill and King worked again together as part of his team. Hill kept a journal during her time in the field and in the journal she describes the "day by day progress which yielded several inscriptions, hundreds of lamps and coins, and several reliefs of Pan, Hermes and the Nymphs." Hill was assigned the study of the marble reliefs, which she published in 1903.

In 1901 Hill finished her master's degree (AM) at Vassar. She then accepted a position from her alma mater as an instructor in the Greek and Roman Studies Department. She spent two years teaching Greek, from 1901 to 1903. In 1903 she enrolled at Columbia University for graduate work and completed her PhD in 1905. Her dissertation was Lycosura and the Date of Damophon, which was published in the American Journal of Archaeology. From 1906 to 1907 she returned to Vassar and taught Latin classes. In the next year Hill moved to the history department where she was promoted to associate professor of ancient history. She taught history classes from 1907 to 1924. While at Vassar, Hill published her first book, Readings in Greek History, From Homer to the Battle of Cheronea; a Collection of Extractions from the Sources (1914). The book was very well received. Hill had a strong interest in the study of history, with an emphasis on the relationship between history and geography and also between history and archaeology and during these years started to research and publish her findings.

In 1916, Hill published an article discussing the connections between archaeology and history and the mutual dependence of the two sciences. In 1919 and 1921 she published two articles focusing on the connection between history and geography. Her 1919 publication compared the city of Troy's historical and physical connection with the Balkans and the Danube. In 1921, she wrote about the connection of history and geography in an article on prehistoric and classical Greece and Italy, where she said "we are learning also that despite man's ingenuity certain fixed conditions in the physical characteristics of an area have made him follow the same routes from time immemorial either by land or by sea and have determined his economic, if not always his political, fate."

== Later archaeological career ==
In 1923, Hill travelled to Italy and Greece to work on a publication on pre-Roman Italy with the focus being the relationship between archaeology and history. The following year, she resigned from Vassar and made Athens her permanent home, where she lived with Bert Hodge Hill, then director of the American School of Classical Studies at Athens, whom she had married in 1924; her long-term partner Elizabeth Pierce Blegen; and Pierce Blegen's husband Carl Blegen.

In 1924, Hill began working on a writing project for Harold North Fowler, the editor-in-chief of the Corinth publications. She was enlisted to publish volumes that would cover all the excavation finds and buildings. Hill committed to publishing the terracottas of Corinth, the project she and Lida Shaw King had initiated and not completed in 1900. With the assistance of Elizabeth Van Buren, a specialist in terracottas, Hill and Elizabeth Pierce Blegen catalogued the new finds from the excavation.

In 1925, Hill participated in an excavation directed by Carl Blegen at Heraeum in Argos. Blegen had discovered Prosymna, an important Bronze Age settlement. In 1927–1928 she participated in excavations at Prosymna and, in 1932–1938, the excavations at Troy and then Pylos. At Pylos, Hill supervised the excavation of a pillaged Tholos tomb. Hill and Elizabeth Blegen were given the task of inventorying the excavation materials for Troy and Prosymna along with Bert Hodge Hill's excavation finds at Lapithos on Cyprus.

Between 1926 and 1927, Hill and Grace Macurdy worked together to try and stop efforts to remove Bert Hodge Hill from the American School's executive committee led by Edward Capps, another committee member.

During this time, Hill began work on a college textbook on Greek archeology, which was a summary of archeological findings in Greece for the prior fifty years. The outbreak of World War I interrupted archeological work being done in Greece and both the Blegens and Thallon Hill moved back to the United States. During the War, Hill continued to work on the textbook. In the 1940s, excavations of the Athenian Agora, the North Slope of the Acropolis, and the Karameikos provided Hill with the opportunity to start work on a new guidebook and textbook on Athenian topography and monuments. This work was published in 1953, entitled Ancient City of Athens.

Hill died in December 1954, aged 79. Six months earlier, she had participated in an excavation with Carl Blegen at Pylos. At the time of her death, she was working on her unpublished manuscript, 50 years of Excavations.

== Personal life ==
Hill met Elizabeth Pierce when she was Pierce's professor at Vassar in 1906. The two women formed an intimate student/mentor relationship that developed into an intimate personal relationship which continued after Pierce left for graduate work at Columbia University. When Pierce returned to Vassar to teach art history in 1915, the couple started living in adjacent rooms in Davison house on campus; their relationship at this time has been described as a 'Boston marriage'.

In 1921, Pierce travelled to Greece with Hill, and the next year attended the American School of Classical Studies in Athens. While in Athens, her budding relationship with archaeologist Carl Blegen led to a marriage proposal from Blegen. Pierce initially accepted but then broke off the engagement as she did not wish to end her relationship with Thallon; a plan was formed by Blegen, Pierce, and Bert Hodge Hill (who appears to have had unreciprocated romantic feelings for Blegen) that Hodge Hill and Thallon would marry at the same time as Pierce and Blegen, and the four would live together; Thallon agreed on condition that she and Pierce would continue to travel and spend time together away from their husbands, and the two couples married in 1924, Thallon and Hill marrying on August 15 at Weston-super-Mare in England.

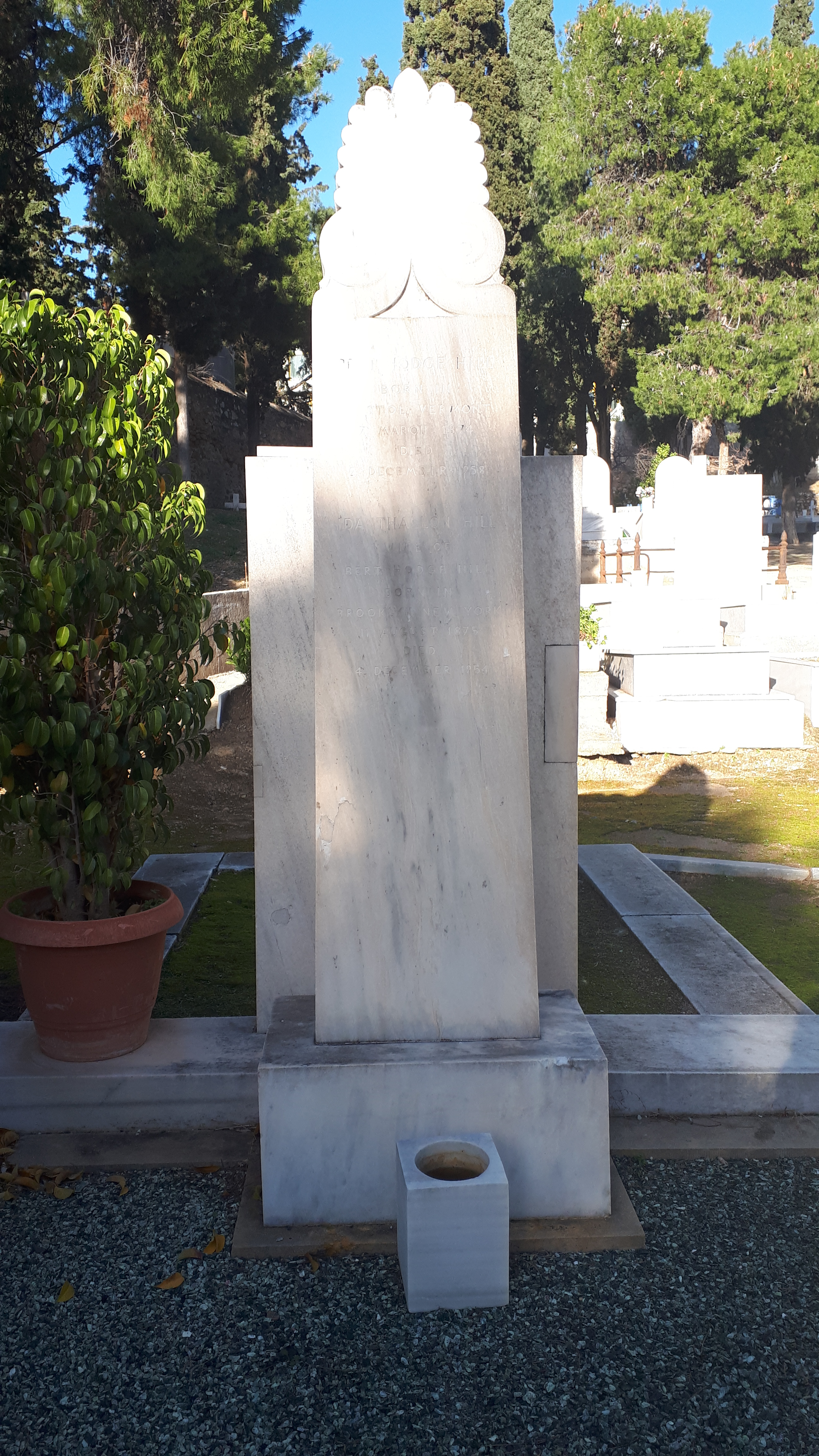
Tombstone of Bert Hodge Hill and Ida Thallon Hill

The four archaeologists, who referred to themselves as "the Family", "the quartet", and "the Pro Par" (short for "Professional Partnership"), had a strong and intertwined relationship both professionally and personally. In their positions as prominent members of the American School of Classical Studies at Athens, they were part of a network of philhellenist artists and writers active in Athens at the time. Thallon Hill and Pierce Blegen often worked together on excavations, cataloguing materials and publishing findings for both their husbands. In 1929 the four moved to 9 Ploutarchou Street, which became their permanent family home. The house became a popular meeting place for archaeologists, students of all foreign schools, diplomats, Vassar alumnae, Greek scholars, Fulbright scholars, and the staff of the American embassy.

During World War II, Hodge Hill remained in Athens to look after the home on Ploutarchou Street while Thallon Hill moved to the United States with the Blegens for the duration of the war. The three lived in Cincinnati where Carl Blegen was a professor of classical archeology.

Hill died at sea on December 14, 1954, while traveling home to Athens, with Pierce Blegen at her side. Hodge Hill died in 1958 and Pierce Blegen died in 1966, three years after she had deeded the house on Ploutarchou Street to the American School of Classical Studies in Athens. Carl Blegen died in 1971. All four members of the Quartet are buried in the Protestant section of the First Cemetery of Athens.

== Selected bibliography ==
- The Cave at Vari. III. Marble Reliefs, Journal of Archeology, Vol. 7, No. 3, (1903), p 301-319
- Readings in Greek History, From Homer to the Battle of Cheronea; a Collection of Extractions from the Sources. Boston: University of California Libraries, 1914
- Some Balkan and Danubian Connexions of Troy, Journal of Historical Studies 39 (1919), 185-201
- New Light on Some Problems of Ancient History Classical World 15 (1921), 10-15.
- A mediaeval humanist: Michael Akominatos, New Haven: Yale University Press, 1923
- Rome of the kings: an archæological setting for Livy and Virgil, New York: E.P Dutton & Co., 1925
- Corinth Series : results of excavations conducted by the American school of classical studies at Athens. Vol. 4., Decorated architectural terracottas, Cambridge: Pub. for the American School of Classical Studies at Athens Harvard University Press, 1929, (with Lida Shaw King)
- The Ancient City of Athens: Its Topography and Monuments, Chicago: Argonaut, 1953
