= Bert Hodge Hill =

American archeologist (1874–1958)

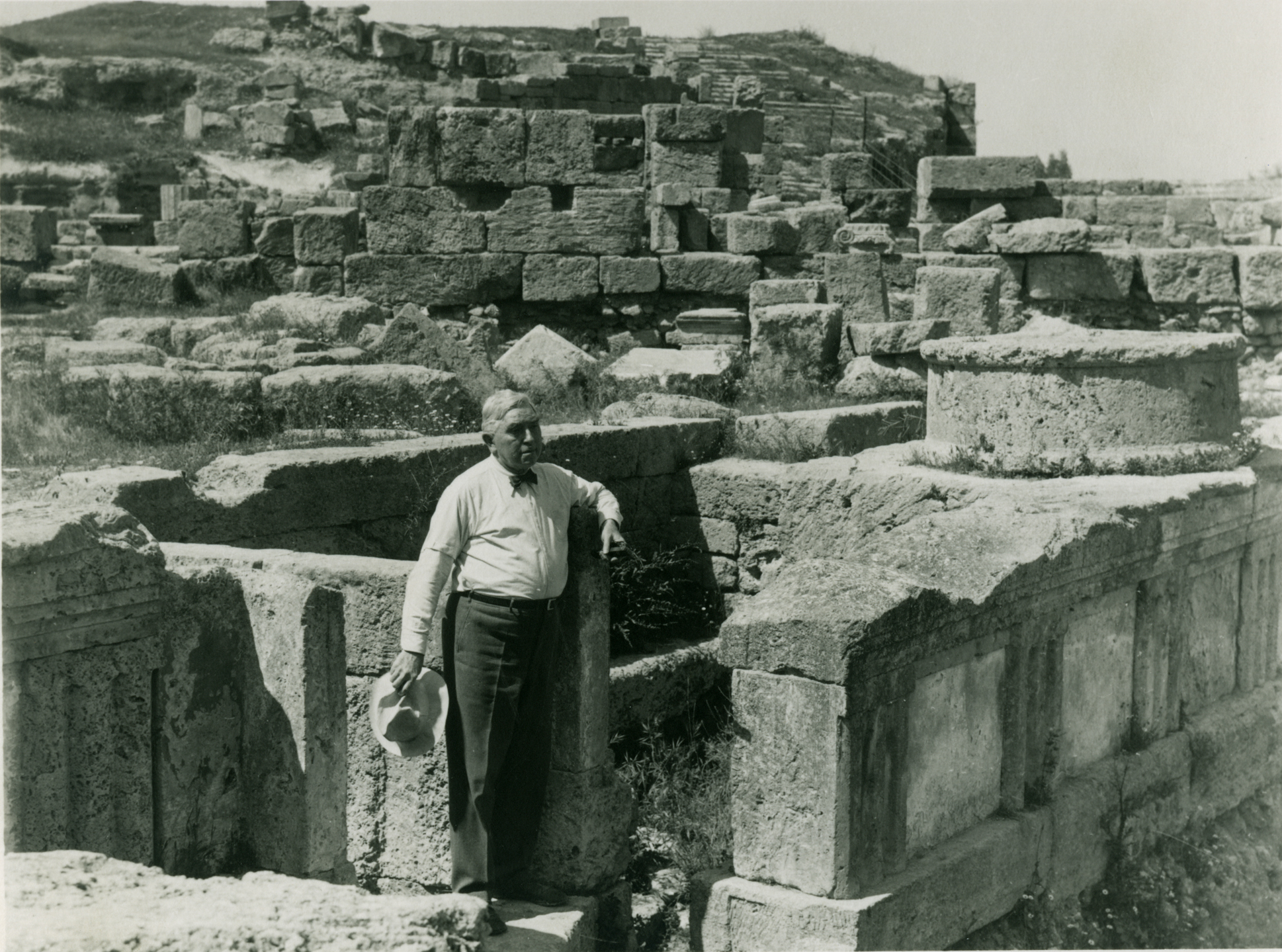
- At Corinth in the 1930s
- Born: March 7, 1874; Bristol, Vermont, U.S.
- Died: December 2, 1958 (aged 84); Athens, Greece
- Education: University of Vermont; Columbia University
- Occupation: Archaeologist at American School of Classical Studies in Athens
- Known for: Director of the American School of Classical Studies in Athens (1906 to 1926)
- Spouse: Ida Thallon (m. 1924; died 1954)
- Partners: Carl Blegen, Elizabeth Denny Pierce

Bert Hodge Hill (March 7, 1874 – December 2, 1958) was an American archeologist and the director of the American School of Classical Studies in Athens from 1906 to 1926.

== Early life and education ==
Bert Hodge Hill was born on March 7, 1874, in Bristol, Vermont, to Carrie Emily (née Hodge) and Alson Collins Hill. He received his AB from the University of Vermont in 1895. He was principal at the Newport Academy in Newport, Vermont, from 1895 to 1895. He obtained his MA from Columbia University in 1900.

== Archeological career ==
He attended the American School of Classical Studies in Athens (ASCSA) in 1901, as a Driser Fellow of Columbia University. He continued at the school as a Fellow of the Archaeological Institute of America for two years (1902–1903). He moved back to the United States, where he was Assistant Curator of Classical Antiquities at the Museum of Fine Arts and Lecturer in Greek Sculpture at Wellesley College.

He then returned to ASCSA and served as director of the school for the next twenty years, from 1906 to 1926. As director, he supervised the Corinth Excavations where his focus was the springs of Peirene, Glauke and the Sacred Spring. He also participated in the study of the monuments of the Athenian Akropolis, specifically the Erechtheum and the Parthenon.

Hill was director of the University of Pennsylvania's Archeological Expedition in Cyprus at the excavations of Lapithos and Kourion in 1932 and from 1934 to 1952. He was the Charles Eliot Norton Lecturer of the Archaeological Institute of America for 1936–1937. He had a scholarly interest in architecture, sculpture, and topography, and was involved in research of epigraphy.

== Private life ==
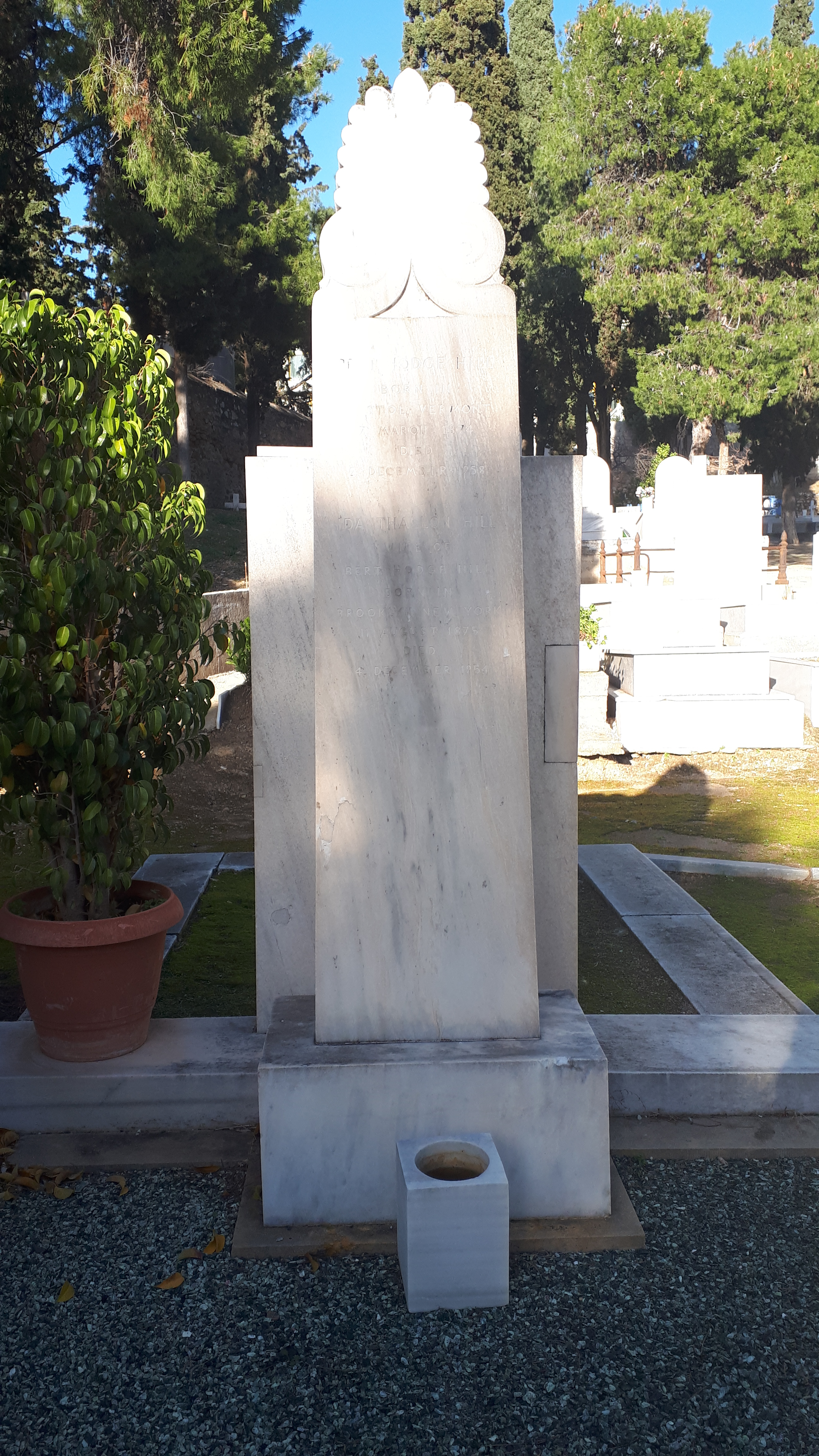
Tombstone of Bert Hodge Hill and Ida Thallon Hill

Hill married archeologist Ida Carleton Thallon in 1924, and the two moved in together in Athens with Thallon's long-term partner Elizabeth Pierce Blegen and her new husband Carl Blegen (for whom Hill appears to have had unreciprocated romantic feelings). They referred to this arrangement - by which Thallon Hill and Pierce Blegen were able to continue their previous relationship, having specified that they would still travel together and spend time alone as well as with their husbands - as 'the family', 'the quartet', or 'the Pro Par' (Professional Partnership). In 1929, the family moved into a new house at 9 Ploutarchou Street, and their home became a popular meeting place for archeologists, students of all foreign schools, diplomats, Vassar alumnae, Greek scholars, Fulbright scholars, and the staff of the American embassy.

During World War II, Hill remained in Athens to look after the home on Ploutarchou Street while Ida Hill moved to the United States with the Blegens for the duration of the war. He volunteered with the Red Cross in Greece during World Wars I and II and served on the Greek Refugee Settlement Commission in the 1920s.

Ida Hill died at sea on a return voyage to Athens in 1954, with Elizabeth Blegen at her side. Hill died in 1958 in Athens. Elizabeth Blegen died in 1966. Carl Blegen died in 1971. The four archeologists are buried next to each other in the First Cemetery of Athens.
