= Eberhard Gothein =

German economist and historian

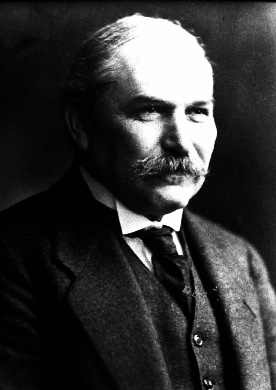
- Born: 29 October 1853; Neumarkt, Silesia, Prussia
- Died: 13 November 1923 (aged 70)
- Education: Heidelberg University
- Spouse: Marie-Luise Gothein (m. 1885)

Eberhard H. Gothein (29 October 1853 in Neumarkt – 13 November 1923 in Berlin) was a German economist and historian. Gothein was a professor at University of Karlsruhe (1885), University of Bonn (1890), and Heidelberg University (1904). He was a representative of the liberal-positivist opposition against the Prussian historical school of Heinrich von Treitschke and Heinrich von Sybel, which was prevalent in Germany. Gothein was the author of valuable works on cultural and economic history, primarily of the 15th to 17th centuries. Furthermore, he was one of the founding fathers of the University of Mannheim's predecessor, the Handelshochschule Mannheim.

== Early life ==
On 29 October 1853, Gothein was born in Neumarkt, Silesia, Prussia.

== Education ==
Gothein studied history, arts and economics at the University of Wrocław and the Heidelberg University until 1877, when he obtained his Ph.D. Gothein finished his habilitation in 1878 in Wrocław.

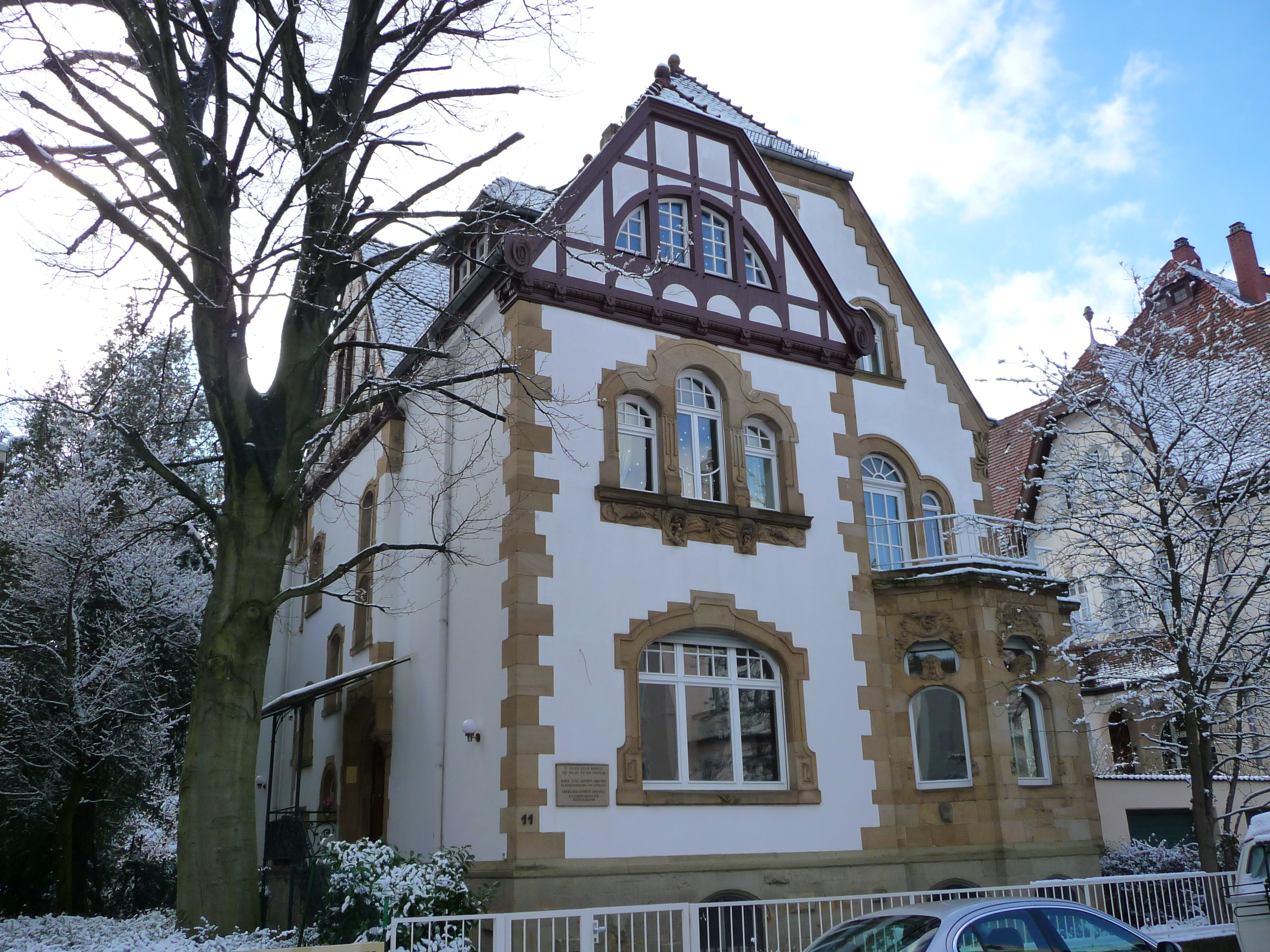
Eberhard Gothein's residence in Mannheim (1904–1923)

== Life ==
Later, Gothein, together with Mannheim's senior mayor Otto Beck, initiated the foundation of the Handelshochschule Mannheim to revive academic education in Mannheim.

== Publications ==
- Der gemeine Pfennig auf dem Reichstage von Worms. Dissertation. Breslau 1877.
- Politische und religiöse Volksbewegungen vor der Reformation. Breslau 1878
- Die Aufgaben der Kulturgeschichte. Veit & Comp, Leipzig 1889.
- Wirtschaftsgeschichte des Schwarzwaldes und der angrenzenden Landschaften. Trübner, Strasbourg 1892.
- Die badischen Markgrafschaften im 16. Jahrhundert. Winter, Heidelberg 1910.
- Die Renaissance in Süditalien. Duncker & Humblot, Munich 1924.

== Literature ==
- Arnold Bergsträßer (1964). "Gothein, Eberhard". Neue Deutsche Biographie (in German). Vol. 6. Berlin: Duncker & Humblot. pp. 654–656. (full text online).
- Andreas Cser: Eberhard Gothein (1853-1923). Max Webers Nachfolger auf dem Heidelberger Lehrstuhl [für Nationalökonomie]. Aspekte seiner Wissenschaftsbiographie. In: Heidelberg. Jahrbuch zur Geschichte der Stadt 11, 2006/07, S. 57–82. ISSN 1432-6116
- Marie Luise Gothein: Eberhard Gothein. Ein Lebensbild. Seinen Briefen nacherzählt. Kohlhammer, Stuttgart 1931.
- Michael Maurer: Eberhard Gothein (1853-1923). Leben und Werk zwischen Kulturgeschichte und Nationalökonomie. Böhlau, Köln u.a. 2007, ISBN 978-3-412-22606-0
- Michael Maurer, Johanna Sänger und Editha Ulrich (Hrsg.): „Im Schaffen geniessen.“ Der Briefwechsel der Kulturwissenschaftler Eberhard und Maria Luise Gothein (1883-1923). Böhlau, Köln u.a. 2006, ISBN 978-3-412-34705-5
- Dagmar Drüll: Heidelberger Gelehrtenlexikon 1803-1932. ( Hrsg.): Rektorat der Ruprecht-Karls-Universität-Heidelberg. Springer Berlin Heidelberg Tokio. 2012. 324 S. ISBN 978-3642707612

== See also ==
- List of University of Mannheim people
