= Marie-Luise Gothein =

Prussian scholar, gardener and author

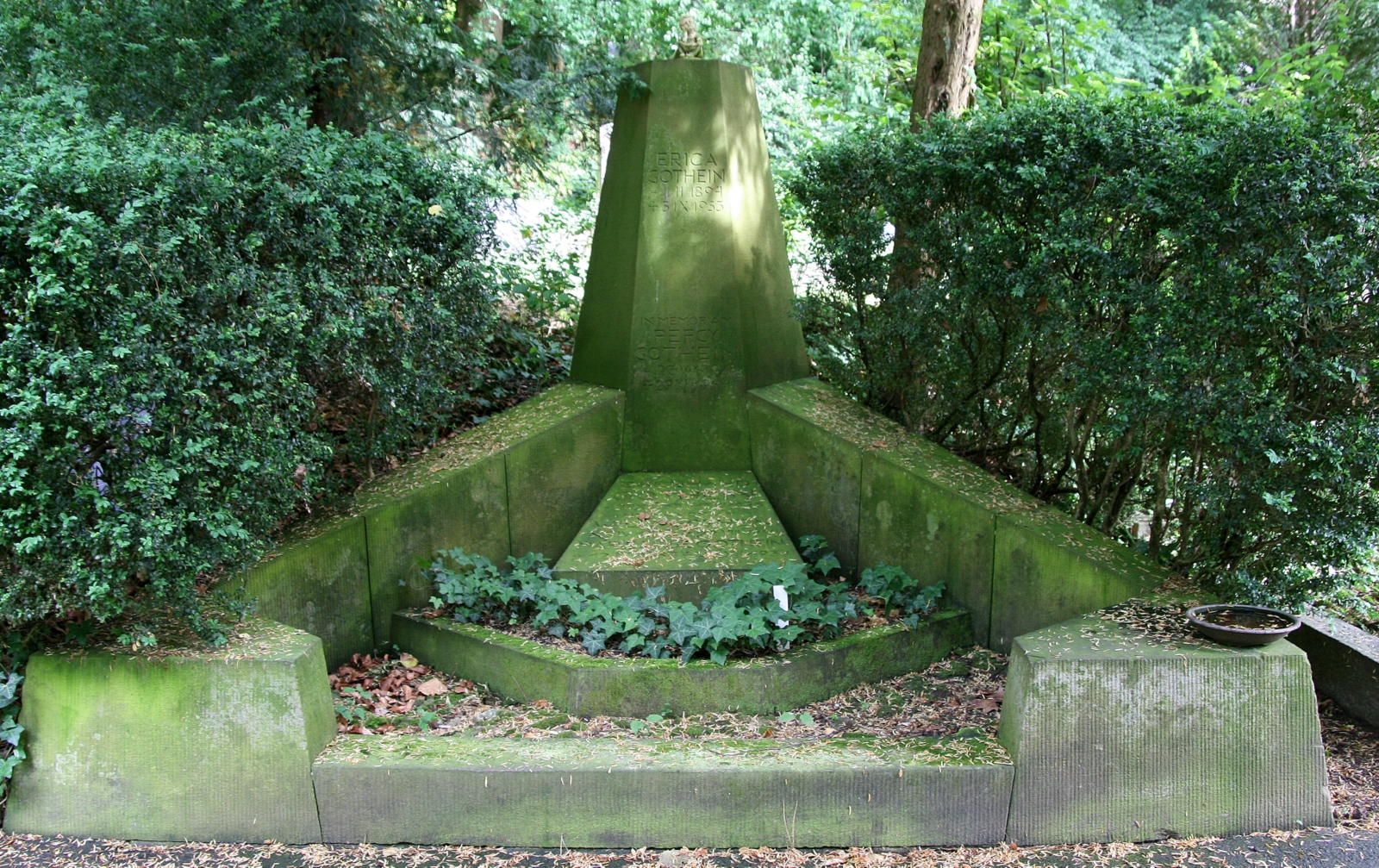
Gothein's grave in Heidelberg

Marie-Luise Gothein (12 September 1863 – 24 December 1931) was a Prussian scholar, gardener and author.

Gothein was born Marie Luise Schröder in Passenheim, East Prussia. She wrote the monumental History of Garden Art, regarded as a standard work. It was published in German in 1913 and English in 1928. It is said to be the "best and most comprehensive" history of the world's gardens. In 1885, she married Eberhard Gothein. After the deaths of her husband and her sons in the First World War, Gothein traveled east and wrote a book on Indian gardens.

She was quoted as saying "The journey through the history of the garden is to walk through the garden of history. People, nations, generations, we are learning in their intimate, domestic habits, their scientific interests, their living and thinking, its solemnity, its decoration."

She died in Heidelberg.

== Publications ==
- History of Garden Art. Volume 1: From Egypt to the Renaissance in Italy, Spain and Portugal. Volume 2: From the Renaissance to the present day in France. Published with the support of the Royal Academy of Construction in Berlin. Diederichs, 1914 ISBN 978-3-424-00935-4
- Gothein, Marie-Luise Schröeter (1863-1931); Wright, Walter P. (1864-1940); Archer-Hind, Laura; Alden Hopkins Collection (1928) [1910]. History of Garden Art. Vol. 2. London & Toronto, New York: J. M. Dent; 1928 Dutton. ISBN 978-3-424-00935-4. 945 pages Publisher: Hacker Art Books; Facsimile edition (June 1972) ISBN 0-87817-008-1; ISBN 978-0-87817-008-1.
- Maria Effinger, Karin Seeber (Hrsg.):"Es ist schon eine wunderbare Zeit, die ich jetzt lebe": Die Heidelberger Gelehrte Marie Luise Gothein (1863-1931). Eine Ausstellung der Universitätsbibliothek Heidelberg, Winter, Heidelberg 2014, ISBN 978-3825363079 (German)
