= Carl Blegen =

American archaeologist (1887–1971)

- Blegen in 1955
- Born: Carl William Blegen; January 27, 1887; Minneapolis, Minnesota, US
- Died: August 24, 1971 (aged 84); Athens, Greece
- Education: Yale University
- Occupation: Classical archaeologist
- Known for: Troy; excavations conducted by the University of Cincinnati, 1932–1938 (1950–58); The Palace of Nestor at Pylos in western Messenia (1966–73)
- Spouse: Elizabeth Denny Pierce (m. 1924; died 1966)
- Partner(s): Ida Thallon Hill, Bert Hodge Hill

Carl William Blegen (January 27, 1887 – August 24, 1971) was an American archaeologist who worked at the site of Pylos in Greece and Troy in modern-day Turkey. He directed the University of Cincinnati excavations of the mound of Hisarlik, the site of Troy, from 1932 to 1938.

== Background ==
Blegen was born in Minneapolis, Minnesota, the eldest of six children born to Anna Regine and John H. Blegen, both of whom had emigrated from Lillehammer, Norway. His younger brother was the historian Theodore C. Blegen. His father was a professor at Augsburg College in Minneapolis for more than 30 years and played a major role in the Norwegian Lutheran Church of America. Blegen earned his bachelor's degree from the University of Minnesota in 1904 and started graduate studies at Yale University in 1907.

== Career ==
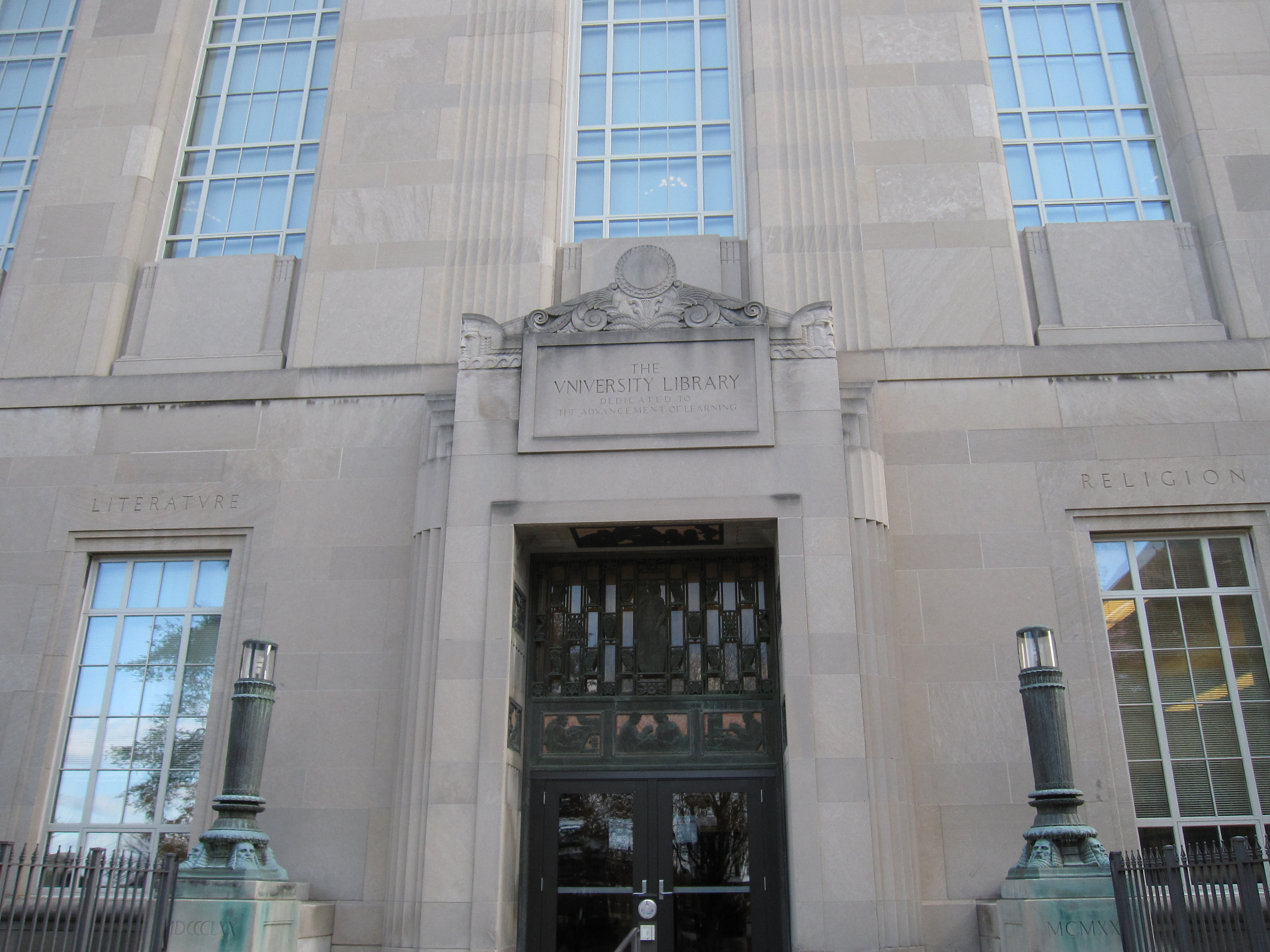
Blegen Library at the University of Cincinnati.

In Greece, he was a fellow at the American School of Classical Studies at Athens between 1911 and 1913, during which time he worked on excavations at Locris, Corinth and Korakou. During World War I Blegen was involved with relief work in Bulgaria and Macedonia, receiving the Order of the Redeemer from Greece in 1919. After the war he completed his Ph.D. at Yale in 1920. He was then assistant director of the American School between 1920 and 1926; during his tenure he excavated at Zygouries, Phlius, Prosymna, and Hymettos. In 1927, Blegen joined the faculty of the University of Cincinnati. Blegen was professor of classical archaeology at the University of Cincinnati from 1927 to 1957. His excavations at Troy were performed between 1932 and 1938, followed by those at the Palace of Nestor in Pylos, Greece, which began in 1939 and resumed after the Second World War in 1952, continuing until 1966. Many of the finds from this excavation are housed in the Archaeological Museum of Chora. Blegen retired in 1957.

He received honorary degrees from the University of Oslo and the University of Thessaloniki in 1951; an honorary D.Litt. from the University of Oxford in 1957 and an honorary LL.D. from the University of Cincinnati in 1958. Further honorary degrees came in 1963: Litt.D. from Cambridge, and others from the University of Athens, Hebrew Union College, Jewish Institute of Religion in Jerusalem. In 1965 Blegen became the first recipient of the Archaeological Institute of America's Gold Medal for archaeological achievement.

Blegen was elected to the American Philosophical Society in 1941 and the American Academy of Arts and Sciences in 1959.

The Carl Blegen Library is located on the campus of the University of Cincinnati. The library has curated an exhibit named Discovering Carl Blegen which includes images from Blegen's major campaigns in Troy and Pylos as well as his work and life at UC and abroad. The Blegen Library at the American School of Classical Studies at Athens is named also after Carl Blegen. Blegen Hall on the University of Minnesota Twin City Campus is named for his brother Theodore C. Blegen.

== Personal life ==
Asked how to pronounce his name, Blegen told The Literary Digest: "Seeking the pagan is Doctor Blegen (blay'gen).

In 1923, Blegen proposed marriage to Elizabeth Denny Pierce, whom he had met at the American School of Classical Studies in Athens; Pierce initially accepted but then ended the engagement as she did not wish to end her long-term relationship with Ida Thallon. A plan was formed by Blegen, Pierce, and Bert Hodge Hill (who seems to have had unreciprocated romantic feelings for Blegen) that Hodge Hill and Thallon would marry at the same time as Pierce and Blegen, and the four would live together; Thallon agreed on condition that she and Pierce would continue to travel and spend time together away from their husbands, and the two couples married and lodged together in Athens in 1924, in a relationship which they referred to as "the Family", "the quartet", and "the Pro Par" (short for "Professional Partnership").

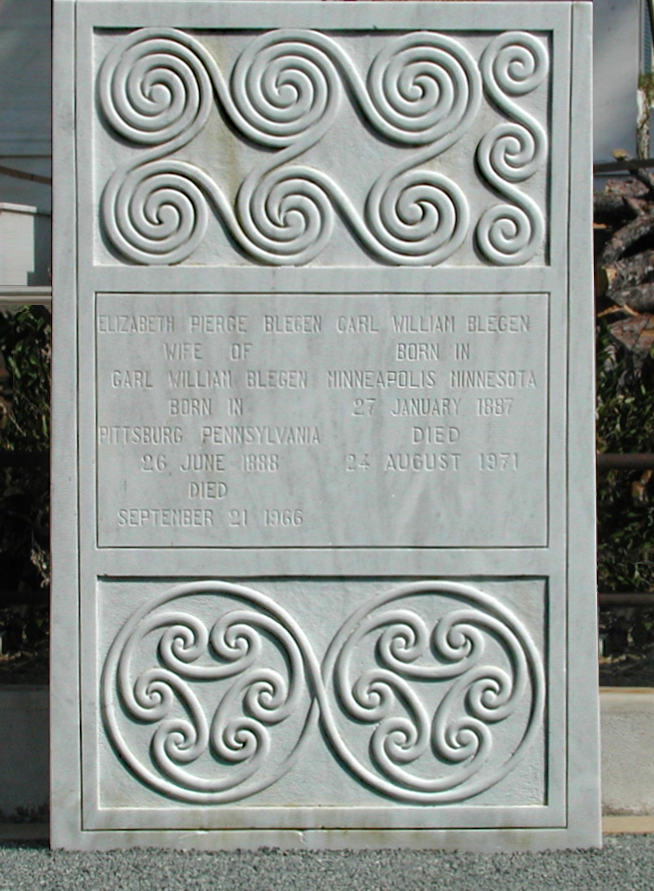
Grave of Carl Blegen and Elizabeth Denny Pierce Blegen at the First Cemetery of Athens

Carl Blegen, a widower since his wife's death in 1966, died in Athens on August 24, 1971, at the age of 84. He is buried in the Protestant corner of the First Cemetery of Athens, together with Elizabeth Pierce Blegen. The graves of Ida Thallon and Bert Hodge Hill are also located in the corner. Carl W. Blegen bequeathed a large collection of his documents to the American School of Classical Studies at Athens.

== Bibliography ==
- 1921. Korakou: A Prehistoric Settlement Near Corinth (The American School of Classical Studies at Athens)
- 1928. Zygouries; a prehistoric settlement in the valley of Cleonae (The American School of Classical Studies at Athens)
- 1937. Prosymna: the Helladic Settlement Preceding the Argive Heraeum. (Cambridge University Press). 2 vols.
- 1941. Studies in the Arts and Architecture (University of Pennsylvania)
- 1950–1958. Troy: Excavations Conducted by the University of Cincinnati, 1932–38, 4 vols.
- 1963. Troy and the Trojans (Praeger)
- 1966-1973. The Palace of Nestor at Pylos in Western Messinia (with Marion Rawson. 3 vols.)

== Sources ==
- Petrakis, Susan L. Ayioryitika: The 1928 Excavations of Carl Blegen at a Neolithic to Early Helladic Settlement in Arcadia (INSTAP Academic Press. 2002)
- Vogeikoff-Brogan, Natalia, Jack L. Davis, and Vassiliki Florou 2014. Carl W. Blegen: personal and archaeological narratives. Lockwood Press.
