= Elizabeth Pierce Blegen =

American archaeologist (1888–1966)

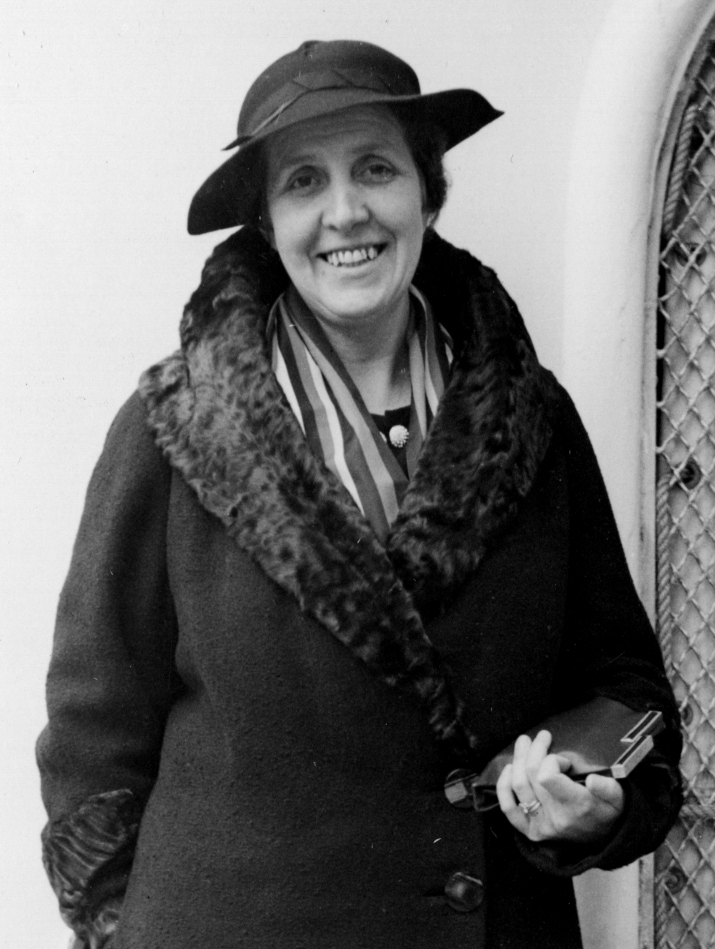
- Blegen in the 1930s
- Born: June 26, 1888; Allegheny, Pennsylvania, US
- Died: September 21, 1966 (aged 78); Athens, Greece
- Education: Vassar College; Columbia University
- Known for: Reporting on archaeological discoveries in Greece
- Spouse: Carl Blegen (m. 1924)
- Partners: Ida Hill, Bert Hodge Hill
- Scientific career
- Fields: Archaeology

Elizabeth Denny Pierce Blegen (June 26, 1888 – September 21, 1966) was an American archaeologist, educator and writer. She excavated at sites in Greece and Cyprus, contributed reports on archaeological discoveries in Greece to the American Journal of Archaeology from 1925 to 1952, and was involved in several organisations promoting women's professional advancement in Greece and the United States.

== Early life and education ==
Elizabeth Denny Pierce, known as 'Libbie', was born on June 26, 1888, in Allegheny, Pennsylvania to Flora McKnight and William Lemmex Pierce. She attended Vassar College from 1906 to 1910, and in 1912 she obtained an MA in Latin, with a thesis on the intellectual life of Gaius Asinius Pollio, a Roman consul (40 BC) and historian.

== Academic career ==
In her first year at Vassar, Pierce met Ida Thallon, who was to have a profound influence on her life and work. Thallon was a professor in the Department of Greek and Roman Studies, who taught Pierce Greek and Latin as a freshman. It is not known exactly when the two women formed a romantic relationship, but when Pierce returned to Vassar to teach art history in 1915 after leaving for graduate work at Columbia University, she and Thallon started living in adjacent rooms in Davison House on campus, and by the late 1910s, they were known to their families and friends as a couple.

From 1915 until 1922, Pierce taught Art History at Vassar and worked as an assistant curator at Vassar's Art Gallery. She was granted her PhD from Columbia in 1922. Her PhD dissertation continued her work from her Master's on Pollio. She travelled to Greece with Thallon in 1921, a trip which inspired her to enroll in the American School of Classical Studies at Athens (ASCSA).

Pierce attended ASCSA from 1922 to 1923 where she became friends with the school's director, Bert Hodge Hill, and archaeologist Carl Blegen, who taught prehistory and general topography classes at the school. Pierce and Blegen's friendship quickly turned into romance and Blegen proposed marriage; Pierce initially accepted but then broke off the engagement as she did not wish to end her relationship with Thallon. Pierce returned to the United States and spent the spring of 1924 working with Gisela Richter at the Metropolitan Museum of Art. Meanwhile, a plan was formed by Blegen, Pierce, and Hodge Hill (who appears to have had unreciprocated romantic feelings for Blegen) that Hodge Hill and Thallon would marry at the same time as Pierce and Blegen, and the four would live together; Thallon agreed on condition that she and Pierce would continue to travel and spend time together away from their husbands, and the two couples married in 1924.

== Archaeological career and life in Athens ==
The four archaeologists, who referred to themselves as "the Family", "the quartet", and "the Pro Par" (short for "Professional Partnership"), had a strong and interconnected relationship both professionally and personally. Thallon Hill and Pierce Blegen often worked together on excavations, cataloguing materials and publishing findings from excavations. These included Carl Blegen's excavations at Prosymna (1927–1928), where Pierce Blegen studied and published the finds of jewellery; Troy (1932–1938); and Pylos, where Pierce Blegen, assisted by Thallon Hill, directed the excavation of a tholos tomb ("Tholos III") at Kato Englianos near the 'Palace of Nestor' (1939), and of the southwestern part of the palace and part of the nearby lower town (1954–56, 1958–62). The two also worked together on Hodge Hill's excavations at Lapithos (Cyprus) and Corinth, where they catalogued new finds in collaboration with Elizabeth Van Buren, a specialist in terracottas. During her first year of marriage, Pierce Blegen also lectured on sculpture at ASCSA.

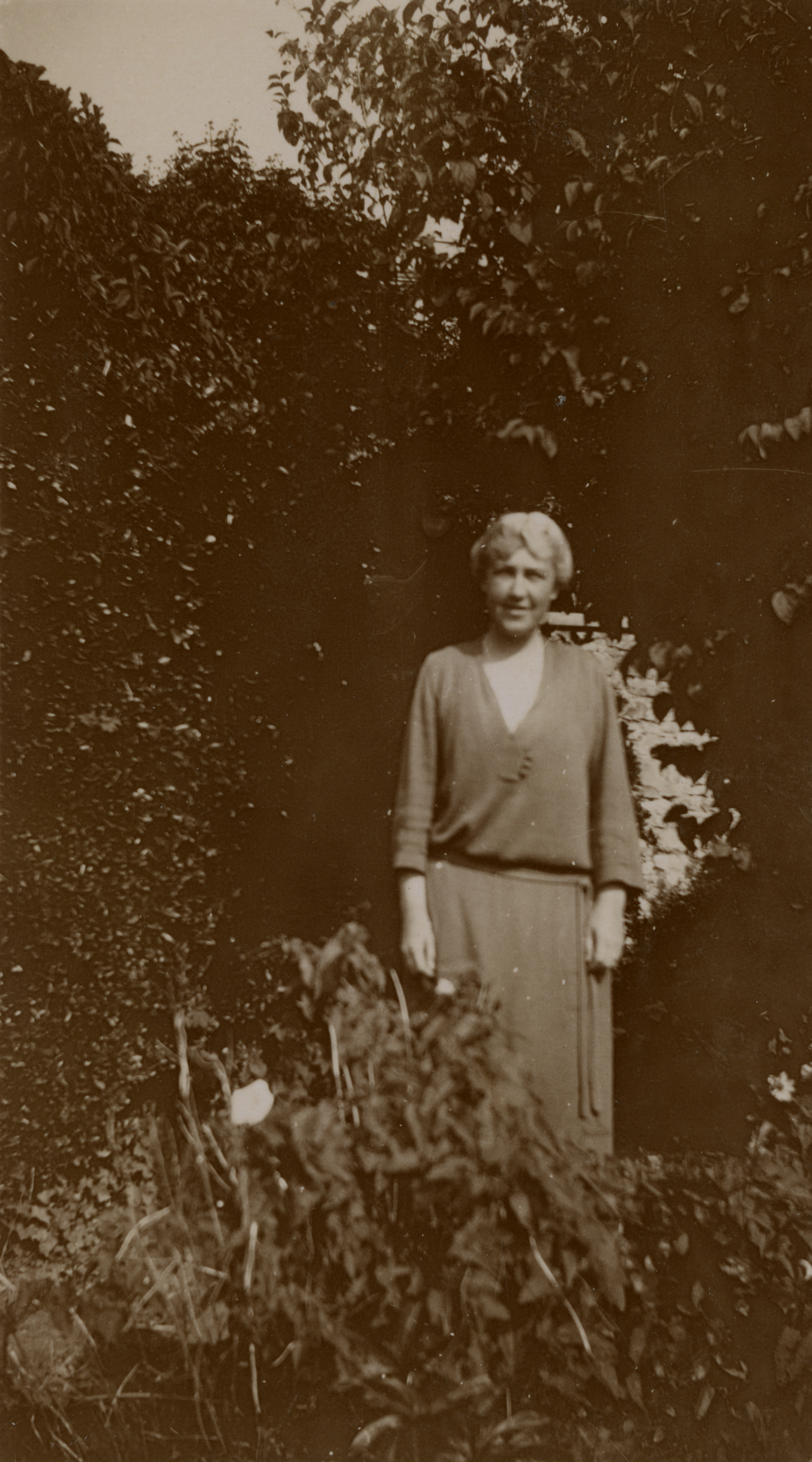
Ida Thallon Hill

Beginning in 1925 and continuing until 1952, Pierce Blegen authored "News Items from Athens" and "Archaeological Discoveries from Greece", regular contributions to the American Journal of Archaeology reporting on new archaeological finds. Archaeologist Lucy Shoe Merritt described these reports in her personal correspondence (May 4, 1997) as "the results of close, careful understanding, first-hand observation and discussion with the excavators whom she grew to know so well and who admired and trusted her with their latest discoveries and thoughts about them [the excavations]".

In 1929, Pierce Blegen purchased a house on 9 Ploutarchou Street in Athens as a home for the family. The house became a popular meeting place for archeologists, students of all foreign schools, diplomats, Vassar alumnae, Greek scholars, Fulbright scholars, and the staff of the American embassy. Pierce Blegen was involved in many American and Greek archaeological and women's professional organisations, including American Women in Greece, the Hellenic American women’s club, the American Association of University Women, the American Historical Association, and the Archaeological Institute of America.

During World War II, Hodge remained in Athens to look after the home on Ploutarchou Street while Thallon moved to the United States with the Blegens for the duration of the war. The three lived in Cincinnati where Carl Blegen was a professor of classical archeology at the University of Cincinnati.

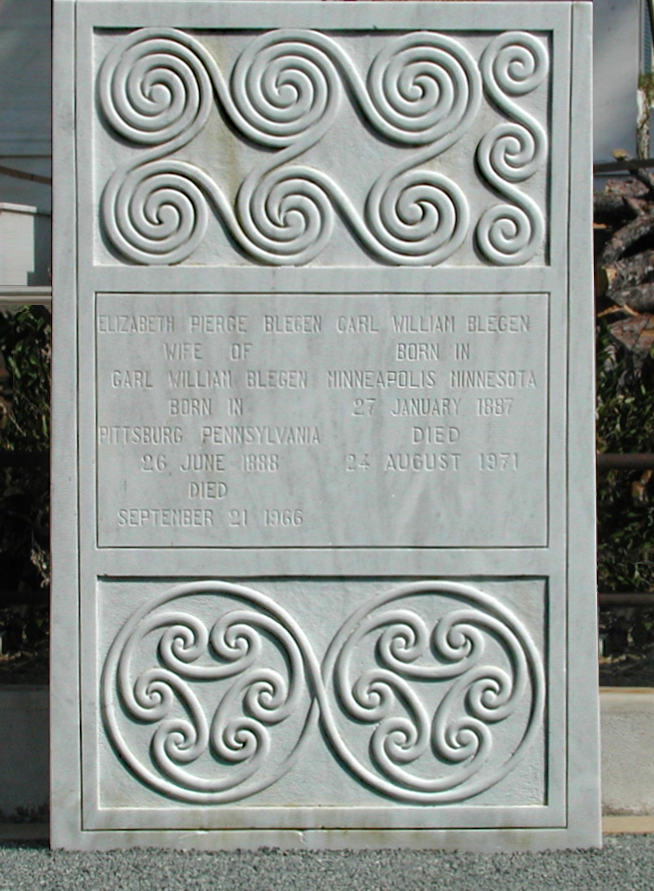
Grave of Elizabeth Pierce Blegen and Carl Blegen

In 1956, Pierce Blegen suffered a stroke which resulted in her spending four months in hospital in Cincinnati. Although she recovered and was able to work in the field again for her final excavation at Pylos in 1958, the stroke affected her mobility and she frequently used a wheelchair. She died ten years later on September 21, 1966, in Athens; Thallon Hill and Hodge Hill had both predeceased her, in 1954 and 1958 respectively, while Blegen died in 1971. The four members of the Quartet are buried near each other in the First Cemetery of Athens.

== Legacy ==
In 1963, Elizabeth Pierce Blegen deeded the Family's home at 9 Ploutarchou to the American School of Classical Studies in Athens, which also holds her archives, including correspondence, her will, diaries, photographs, and watercolours. 9 Ploutarchou was made a listed building in 1983 and now is the home of the J.F. Costopoulos charitable foundation. A trust fund left to Vassar College in her will enabled the establishment in 1975 of the Blegen Distinguished Visiting Professorship in Classics. In 2011, Rachel Kitzinger, professor of classics and dean of Planning and Academic Affairs at Vassar, summarized Pierce Blegen's importance and influence on Vassar's Department of Greek and Roman Studies:

Of all the distinguished women classicists who were involved early on with the Vassar department, Elizabeth Pierce Blegen has had the most long-lasting effect on the department. Her will bequeathed an endowment to the department to support research in classical antiquity and has allowed the department to bring a research fellow or distinguished professor to the college every year... to teach a course and do research.

Until 2008, Vassar's LGBTQ Center was located in Blegen House.

Pierce Blegen is remembered for her role in disseminating news of Athenian archaeological discoveries, thanks to her close relationships with other archaeologists conducting excavations; for the assistance she gave to both academic colleagues and to students; and her promotion of women's professional advancement through her involvement in a range of women's organisations.

== Selected bibliography ==
- "A Roman Colony in the Alps: Aosta", Art and Archeology (1922), p. 83–90
- "A Daedalid in the Skimatari Museum", American Journal of Archaeology, Vol 28. (1924), p. 267–275.
- "News Items from Athens", and "Archaeological Discoveries from Greece", American Journal of Archaeology (1925–1952)
- 'The jewellery and ornaments', in Carl W. Blegen, Prosymna, the Helladic settlement preceding the Argive Heraeum (Cambridge University Press, 1937)
- "Recent Discoveries on Greek and Roman Art", Gazette des Beaux-Arts (1942), p. 63–76
