= 1976 New Year Honours =

British royal recognitions

The New Year Honours 1976 were appointments in many of the Commonwealth realms of Queen Elizabeth II to various orders and honours to reward and highlight good works by citizens of those countries. They were announced on 1 January 1976 to celebrate the year passed and mark the beginning of 1976.

The recipients of honours are displayed here as they were styled before their new honour, and arranged by honour, with classes (Knight, Knight Grand Cross, etc.) and then divisions (Military, Civil, etc.) as appropriate.

== United Kingdom and Commonwealth ==
=== Life Peer ===
Barons

- Sir Thomas Brimelow, GCMG, OBE, lately Permanent Under-Secretary of State, Foreign and Commonwealth Office, and Head of the Diplomatic Service.
- Sir Alan Louis Charles Bullock, FBA, Master of St Catherine's College, Oxford.
- Sir Frank Schon, Chairman, National Research Development Corporation.
- Sir John Edward Wall, OBE, Director, Exchange Telegraph (Holdings) Ltd.
- Paul Norman Wilson, OBE, DSC, Her Majesty's Lord Lieutenant of Cumbria.

=== Privy Counsellor ===
- Albert Edward Booth, MP, Minister of State, Department of Employment; Member of Parliament for Barrow-in-Furness.
- Denis Herbert Howell, MP, Minister of State for Sport, Department of the Environment; Member of Parliament for the Small Heath Division of Birmingham.
- Gordon William Humphreys Richardson, MBE, Governor, Bank of England.

=== Knight Bachelor ===
- William Owen Campbell Adamson, Director-General, Confederation of British Industry.
- Richard Samuel Attenborough, CBE, Actor, Producer and Director.
- John William Atwell, CBE, FRSE. For services to mechanical engineering.
- John Francis Boyd, lately Lobby Correspondent, The Guardian.
- Henry Brian Boyne, CBE, Political Correspondent, The Daily Telegraph.
- Professor Ernest Henry Phelps Brown, MBE, FBA. For services to Economics.
- Arthur Bryan, Chairman and Managing Director, Josiah Wedgwood & Sons Ltd. For services to Export.
- Arnold Stanley Vincent Burgen, FRS, Director, National Institute for Medical Research, Medical Research Council.
- Robert Anthony Clark, DSC, Chairman, Industrial Development Advisory Board.
- John Vivian Dacie, FRS, Professor of Haematology, Royal Postgraduate Medical School, University of London.
- Alun Talfan Davies, QC. For public services in Wales.
- Richard Portway Dobson, Chairman, British-American Tobacco Co. Ltd.
- John Denis Forman, OBE, Chairman and Managing Director, Granada Television Ltd.
- John Hrothgar Habakkuk, FBA, Vice-Chancellor, University of Oxford.
- Charles Denis Hamilton, DSO, TD. For services to the Arts.
- James Haughton, CBE, QPM, Chief Constable, Merseyside Police.
- William MacGregor Henderson, Secretary, Agricultural Research Council.
- Peter Michael Kirk, MP. For services to the European Parliament.
- Guy Kempton Lawrence, DSO, OBE, DFC, Chairman, Food and Drink Industries Council.
- Thomas Desmond Lorimer, Chairman, Northern Ireland Housing Executive.
- Cyril Edward Lucas, CMG, FRS. For services to the Natural Environment Research Council.
- His Honour Judge Rudolph Lyons, QC, Circuit Judge and Recorder of Liverpool.
- The Right Honourable Richard William Marsh, Chairman, British Railways Board.
- Alexander Walter Merrison, FRS, DL, Vice-Chancellor, University of Bristol.
- George Irvine Mitchell, CB, QC, Legal Secretary and First Parliamentary Draftsman for Scotland.
- Francis Edwin Prescott Sandilands, CBE, Chairman, Commercial Union Assurance Co. Ltd.
- Peter Malcolm Shepherd, CBE, Chairman, Construction Industry Training Board.
- Simpson Stevenson, Chairman, Greater Glasgow Health Board.
- Maurice Sutherland, Leader, Cleveland County Council.
- Captain David Stanley Tibbits, DSC, Royal Navy (Retd.), Deputy Master, Trinity House.
- Huw Pyrs Wheldon, OBE, MC, lately Managing Director, Television, British Broadcasting Corporation.
- William Thomas Williams, QC, MP. For services to the Inter-Parliamentary Union.
- Gordon Ethelbert Ward Wolstenholme, OBE, Director, The Ciba Foundation.
- Robert Brash Wright, DSO, OBE, Consultant Surgeon, Southern General Hospital, Glasgow.

Diplomatic Service and Overseas List

- Probyn Ellsworth Inniss, MBE, Governor of St. Kitts-Nevis-Anguilla.

Australian States

State of New South Wales

- Kenneth Owens Humphreys. For services to commerce and the community.
- Alderman Nicholas Michael Shehadie, OBE, lately Lord Mayor of Sydney.

State of Victoria

- The Honourable Mr. Justice Edward Hamilton Esler Barber, QC, of Toorak. For distinguished services to Victoria.
- The Honourable Kenneth Henry Wheeler, MP, of Strathmore. For services as Speaker of the Legislative Assembly.

State of Queensland

- Professor Emeritus Zelman Cowen, CMG, QC, Vice Chancellor of the University of Queensland.
- Leslie Victor Price, OBE. For services to the advancement of the grain growing industry in Queensland and Australia.

State of Western Australia

- Commodore James Maxwell Ramsay, CBE, DSC, Royal Australian Navy (Retired). Lieutenant Governor of Western Australia.

=== Order of the Bath ===
==== Knight Grand Cross of the Order of the Bath (GCB) ====
Military Division

- Lieutenant-General Sir Frank King, KCB, MBE, (138204), late Infantry, Colonel Commandant Army Air Corps.

Civil Division

- Sir Arthur Lucius Michael Cary, KCB, Permanent Under-Secretary of State, Ministry of Defence.

==== Knight Commander of the Order of the Bath (KCB) ====
Military Division

Royal Navy

- Vice Admiral John Ernle Pope.
- Vice Admiral Iwan Geoffrey Raikes, CBE, DSC.

Army

- Major-General William Gerald Hugh Beach, OBE, MC, (251023), late Corps of Royal Engineers.

Royal Air Force

- Air Marshal Alfred Henry Wynne Ball, CB, DSO, DFC.
- Air Marshal Michael James Beetham, CBE, DFC, AFC.

Civil Division

- Peter Willoughby Carey, CB, Second Permanent Secretary, Department of Industry.
- Kenneth Henry Clucas, CB, Permanent Secretary, Department of Prices and Consumer Protection.
- Lancelot Errington, CB, Second Permanent Secretary, Department of Health and Social Security.
- Richard Brian Meredith King, CB, MC, Permanent Secretary, Ministry of Overseas Development.
- Ronald Walter Radford, CB, MBE, Chairman, Board of Customs and Excise.

==== Companion of the Order of the Bath (CB) ====
Military Division

Royal Navy

- Rear Admiral Derek Willoughby Bazalgette.
- Rear Admiral Ronald Albert Harcus.
- Rear Admiral Alfred Raymond Rawbone, AFC.
- Rear Admiral John Oliver Roberts.

Army

- Major-General John Michael Watson Badcock, MBE, (233401), late Royal Corps of Signals, Colonel Commandant Royal Corps of Signals.
- Brigadier Helen Cattanach, RRC, QHNS, (348096), Queen Alexandra's Royal Army Nursing Corps.
- Major-General Ernest Lionel Ouseley Hood, QHP, (115984), late Royal Army Medical Corps.
- Major-General Robert Lyon, OBE, (288788), late Royal Regiment of Artillery.
- Brigadier Eileen Joan Nolan, Honorary ADC, (345795), Women's Royal Army Corps.
- Major-General Norman Henry Speller (155921), late Royal Army Ordnance Corps.

Royal Air Force

- Air Vice-Marshal Arthur Daniel Button, OBE.
- Air Vice-Marshal Ian Robert Campbell, CBE, AFC, Royal Air Force (Retired).
- Air Vice-Marshal George John Kemp, Royal Air Force (Retired).
- Air Vice-Marshal Patrick Joseph O'Connor, OBE, QHP.
- Air Vice-Marshal Harry Charles Southgate, CBE.

Civil Division

- Colin Faulds Allan, Under Secretary, Department of the Environment.
- John Alexander Atkinson, DFC, Deputy Secretary, Department of Health and Social Security.
- Kenneth Edward Couzens, Deputy Secretary, HM Treasury.
- Frederick Henry East, Director, Royal Armament Research and Development Establishment, Ministry of Defence.
- John Martin Fearn, Secretary, Scottish Education Department.
- William John Gray, lately Medical Superintendent and Governor, Grendon Prison.
- Eugene Grebenik, Principal, Civil Service College.
- John Michael Green, Deputy Chairman, Board of Inland Revenue.
- Maurice Kingston Harris, Permanent Secretary, Northern Ireland Civil Service Group, Northern Ireland Office.
- John Audley Harrison, Principal Director, Ministry of Defence.
- Brian David Hayes, Deputy Secretary, Ministry of Agriculture, Fisheries and Food.
- Ian Francis Hudson, Secretary, Royal Commission on the Distribution of Income and Wealth.
- Michael James Jardine, Deputy Director of Public Prosecutions.
- Michael James Kerry, Solicitor, Department of Industry.
- James Richard Madge, Deputy Secretary, Department of the Environment.
- Douglas Anthony Newton, Senior Registrar, Principal Registry of the Family Division of the High Court.
- Philip Nicholls, lately Commissioner for Administration and Finance, Forestry Commission.
- Edward Hugh Simpson, Deputy Secretary, Department of Education and Science.
- Brian George Tucker, OBE, Deputy Secretary, Department of Energy.

=== Order of Saint Michael and Saint George ===
==== Knight Grand Cross of the Order of St Michael and St George (GCMG) ====
Diplomatic Service and Overseas List

- Sir William Vincent John Evans, KCMG, MBE, lately Legal Adviser, Foreign and Commonwealth Office.
- Sir Roger William Jackling, KCMG, lately Leader of the United Kingdom Delegation to the Conference on the Law of the Sea.

==== Knight Commander of the Order of St Michael and St George (KCMG) ====
Diplomatic Service and Overseas List

- David Francis Muirhead, CMG, CVO, Her Majesty's Ambassador, Brussels.
- Francis Brooks Richards, CMG, DSC, Her Majesty's Ambassador, Athens.
- Howard Frank Trayton Smith, CMG, Her Majesty's Ambassador (designate) Moscow.
- Kenneth Michael Wilford, CMG, Her Majesty's Ambassador, Tokyo.

Australian States

State of New South Wales

- The Honourable Laurence Whistler Street, Lieutenant Governor and Chief Justice of New South Wales.

==== Companion of the Order of St Michael and St George (CMG) ====
- Stanley George Browne, OBE, Director, Leprosy Study Centre. Consultant Adviser, Department of Health and Social Security.
- Kenneth William Cotterill, Under Secretary, Exports Credits Guarantee Department.
- Alexander Elkin, Foreign and Commonwealth Office.
- Andrew Gardiner Lyall, Assistant Secretary, Department of the Environment.
- Leonard Mullins, Director of Research, The Malaysian Rubber Producers' Research Association.

Diplomatic Service and Overseas List

- Antony Arthur Acland, Her Majesty's Ambassador, Luxembourg.
- Walter Leonard Allinson, MVO, Minister, British High Commission, New Delhi.
- John Oliver Chubb, Foreign and Commonwealth Office.
- Simon Yelverton Dawbarn, Her Majesty's Consul-General, Montreal.
- Henry Alexander Dudgeon, Foreign and Commonwealth Office.
- Oliver Grantham Forster, MVO, lately Minister, British High Commission, New Delhi.
- Neville Arthur Irwin French, MVO, Governor, Falkland Islands.
- Peter Harold Laurence, MC, Foreign and Commonwealth Office.
- John Campbell Moberly, Her Majesty's Ambassador, Amman.
- Kenneth Robert Comyn Pridham, Foreign and Commonwealth Office.
- Eric Norman Smith, Counsellor, British High Commission, Singapore.
- Alexander John Dickson Stirling, lately Counsellor and Head of Chancery, Her Majesty's Embassy, Beirut.
- Kenneth Wallis Joseph Topley, Director of Education, Hong Kong.

Australian States

State of New South Wales

- Donald Munro Shand. For services to the community.

State of Victoria

- The Honourable Thomas Walter Mitchell, MP, of Corryong. For services to the community, particularly in the fields of politics, alpine sports and safety and writing.

State of Queensland

- Douglas Blaikie Duncan, of Hamilton. For services to charity, commerce and sport.

State of Western Australia

- Percy Pearson, OBE, JP. For services to the community through the Returned Services League, and the Methodist Church.

=== Royal Victorian Order ===
==== Knight Grand Cross of the Royal Victorian Order (GCVO) ====
- Lieutenant-Colonel The Right Honourable Sir Martin Michael Charles Charteris, KCB, KCVO, OBE.

==== Knight Commander of the Royal Victorian Order (KCVO) ====
- Lieutenant-Colonel John Derek Hornung, OBE, MC.
- The Right Honourable Ian St. John, Baron Luke of Pavenham, TD.

==== Commander of the Royal Victorian Order (CVO) ====
- Lady Elizabeth Legge Bassett.
- Joseph Frederick Burrell.
- Major-General Claude Ernest Pert, CB, DSO.
- Lindsay John Rose, OBE.
- Phyllis Evelyn Gordon-Spencer.
- Jean Elizabeth Taylor, MVO.
- The Right Honourable Henry David Leonard George, Baron Walston of Newton.
- Kenneth Percy Witney.

==== Member of the Royal Victorian Order (MVO) ====
At this time the two lowest classes of the Royal Victorian Order were "Member (fourth class)" and "Member (fifth class)", both with post-nominal letters MVO. "Member (fourth class)" was renamed "Lieutenant" (LVO) from the 1985 New Year Honours onwards.

Fourth Class

- Captain The Honourable Edward Nicholas Canning Beaumont.
- Maurice Francis Bond, OBE.
- Commander David Michael Lisle Braybrooke, Royal Navy.
- Lady Elizabeth Georgiana Alice Cavendish.
- Lieutenant-Colonel Peter Pender-Cudlip.
- Surgeon Commander John Barry Gill, Royal Navy.
- Lieutenant-Commander Alan MacGregor, Royal Navy.
- Wing Commander David Winslow Parsons, Royal Air Force.
- Edward Howell Prater.
- Thomas Woodfine Taylor, OBE.

Fifth Class

- Stanley Robert James Bruce.
- Squadron Leader Jack Alured Challinor, DFM, Royal Air Force.
- Elizabeth Clark.
- George William Edwards.
- William Gerard McTear, MBE.
- Michael John Reilly.

=== Royal Victorian Medal (RVM) ===
In Gold

- Arthur Halse.

In Silver

- Jack Buckman.
- Chief Marine Engineering Mechanic Ian Denny, K 891644A.
- Harry Humphrey.
- Albert Johnson.
- Marion McCourtney.
- Christine Jessie MacKinnon.
- Joseph Rowe.
- HO685368 Chief Technician Raymond John Seal, Royal Air Force.
- Michael Christopher Martin Sealey.
- Albert Edward Wooders.

=== Order of the British Empire ===
==== Knight Grand Cross of the Order of the British Empire (GBE) ====
Military Division

- General Sir Richard Ward, KCB, DSO, MC, (73199), late Royal Armoured Corps, Colonel Commandant Royal Tank Regiment.

Civil Division

- Sir Ronald George Leach, CBE, Senior Partner, Peat, Marwick, Mitchell & Co., Chartered Accountants. For public services.

==== Dame Commander of the Order of the British Empire (DBE) ====
Civil Division

- Janet Abbott Baker, CBE, Singer.
- Joan Evans. For charitable services, CBE.

Australian States

State of Victoria

- Edith Burnside, OBE, of Toorak. For services to hospitals and the community.

==== Knight Commander of the Order of the British Empire (KBE) ====
Military Division

- Vice Admiral Peter White, CBE.
- Major-General David William Scott-Barrett, MBE, MC, (224216), late Foot Guards.

Civil Division
Diplomatic Service and Overseas List

- Alexander Albert Hunter, Speaker of the House of Representatives, Belize.
- John Richard Wraight, CMG, Her Majesty's Ambassador, Berne.

Australian States

State of New South Wales

- The Most Reverend Marcus Lawrence Loane, Archbishop of Sydney.

==== Commander of the Order of the British Empire (CBE) ====
Military Division

Royal Navy

- Commodore John Asbury.
- Commodore Simon Alastair Cassillis Cassels.
- Captain Gilbert John Fairley.
- Captain (I) Henry Charles Malkin.

Army

- Brigadier Archibald Cull Birtwistle, OBE, (406347), late Royal Corps of Signals.
- Brigadier Ernest Frederick Faulkner (156347), Army Catering Corps.
- Brigadier Desmond Hind Garrett Rice, OBE, (334890), late Royal Armoured Corps.
- Brigadier John James Hope Simpson (364953), late Infantry.
- Colonel Henry Michael Tillotson, OBE, (393310), late Infantry.
- Colonel Christopher Douglas Bryan Troughton, MC, (403708), late Royal Armoured Corps (now R.A.R.O.).
- Colonel Peter Hugh Vaughan, MBE, (308227), late Infantry.

Royal Air Force

- Acting Air Commodore Herbert George Slade, AFC.
- Group Captain Douglas Terence Beamish, OBE, (Retired).
- Group Captain George Keith Mossman, OBE.
- Group Captain Thomas Dixon Sanderson, OBE, AFC.
- Group Captain Dennis Woods.

Civil Division

- Thomas Coats Campbell Adam, MBE, Chairman, Northern Ireland Council for Nurses and Midwives.
- James Nicholas Allan, Assistant Secretary, Northern Ireland Office.
- Professor Ephraim Saul Anderson, FRS, Director, Enteric Reference Laboratory, Public Health Laboratory Service.
- Leonard Bruce Archer, Professor of Design Research, Royal College of Art.
- John Robinson Ashton, Chairman, Lancashire Education Committee.
- Enid Bagnold (Lady Jones), Writer.
- John Vernon Bartlett, Senior Partner, Mott, Hay and Anderson.
- Ivor Ralph Campbell Batchelor, FRSE, Professor of Psychiatry, University of Dundee.
- Edward Christopher Baughan, OBE, lately Professor of Chemistry, Royal Military College of Science, Ministry of Defence.
- William Bennett, Chairman, Lancashire Area Health Authority.
- Alan Blakemore, Town Clerk and Chief Executive, London Borough of Croydon.
- Christian John Storey Bonington. For services to Mountaineering.
- David Victor Boyd, Director of Audit, Exchequer and Audit Department.
- Cyril Franklin Brooke, lately Assistant Treasury Solicitor.
- James Donald Brown. For services to the community in Orkney.
- Leonard William Kilner Brown, Education Officer, Association of County Councils.
- James William Douglas Bull, lately Director of Radiology, National Hospital for Nervous Diseases, London.
- Geoffrey Chandler, Director, Shell International Petroleum Co.
- James Bainbridge Chaplin, lately Director of Social Services, Hertfordshire.
- Edwin Philip Chappell, Chairman, National Ports Council.
- Stanley Twyford Charles, Assistant Secretary, Welsh Office.
- Herbert Mitchell Newton-Clare, MC, Chairman, Meat Manufacturers' Association.
- John Rupert Crane, MBE, Director, Imperial Metal Industries Ltd.
- Francis Maurel Cumberlege, Chairman, City and East London Area Health Authority.
- Emyr Currie-Jones. For social and local government services in South Wales.
- Oswald Phillips Davies, Senior Principal Inspector of Taxes, Board of Inland Revenue.
- The Right Honourable Charles Denman, Baron Denman, MC, TD, lately Chairman, Committee for Middle East Trade. For services to Export.
- Charles Enrique Dent, FRS, Professor of Human Metabolism, University College Hospital Medical School, University of London.
- Gladys Felicia Dimson, Member, Greater London Council.
- Arthur Durham Divine, OBE, DSM, Defence Correspondent, The Sunday Times.
- Christopher Selby Austin Dobson, Librarian, House of Lords.
- Leslie Gordon James Durbin, MVO, Silversmith.
- Harry Elliot, FRS, Professor of Physics, Imperial College of Science and Technology, University of London.
- Charles Ansell Emanuel, Assistant Solicitor, Department of Health and Social Security.
- The Reverend Canon Sydney Hall Evans. For services to religious training.
- Bernard Melchior Feilden, OBE, Architect.
- John McIntyre Ferguson, Chairman, Engineering Board, Science Research Council.
- Ivor Campbell Fletcher, Director, Property Services Agency, Department of the Environment.
- Jean Esther Floud, Principal, Newnham College, University of Cambridge.
- Horace William Alexander Francis, Vice-Chairman and Assistant Chief Executive, Tarmac Ltd. For services to Export.
- Colonel James Douglas Fraser, TD, DL, Chairman, Lowlands of Scotland, Territorial Auxiliary and Volunteer Reserve Association.
- Peter Gardner, MC, TD, Assistant Managing Director, Wiggins Teape Ltd.
- Selchouk Ahmed Ghalib, lately Managing Director, Nuclear Power Co.
- Major Patrick Hunter Gordon, MC, DL, Chairman, A.I. Welders Ltd.
- Frank Gorner, Principal, Didsbury College of Education.
- Thomas Cecil Gray, Professor of Anaesthesia and Dean of the Faculty of Medicine, University of Liverpool.
- Professor Charles Stuart Grant Grunsell, Chairman, Veterinary Products Committee.
- Freda Millicent Gundry, Regional Nursing Officer, Wessex Regional Health Authority.
- Stewart Ewer Gunn, TD, lately Staff Inspector, Department of Education and Science.
- Isobel Frances Haddow, Assistant Secretary, Department of Agriculture and Fisheries for Scotland.
- Norman Lancelot Hall, MBE. For services to the City of London.
- William Joseph Hayden, Director, Ford of Britain. For services to Export.
- The Right Honourable George Charles Hayter, Baron Hayter, Chairman, International Freight Movement Economic Development Committee.
- Daphne Constance, Lady Heald, OBE. For public services and particularly to Nursing.
- Francis John Hill, County Education Officer, Suffolk.
- Stephen Hinchliff, Joint Deputy Chairman, Dowty Group Ltd. For services to Export.
- John Waller Hobson, lately Chairman, The Advertising Association.
- Antony Hopkins, Composer and Conductor.
- Robin Jared Stanley Howard, Director General, Contemporary Dance Trust Ltd.
- James Ralph Hudson, Ophthalmic Surgeon, Moorfields Eye Hospital.
- Henry James Ellis Hunt, OBE, Assistant Commissioner, Metropolitan Police.
- Philip Thomas Ireton, DL, Chairman, Hertfordshire County Council.
- James Jackson, lately Vice-Chairman, Milk Marketing Board for England and Wales.
- Kevin William Keohane, Professor of Science Education, Chelsea College, University of London.
- John Michael Langham, Chairman, Stone Manganese Marine Ltd. For services to Export.
- Laurence Ernest Liddell, ERD, TD, lately Chairman, Scottish Sports Council.
- Matthew McKinnon Linning, OBE, General Manager, Offshore Development, BP Petroleum Development Ltd.
- Henry Solomon Lipson, FRS, Professor of Physics, Faculty of Technology, University of Manchester.
- Robin Home McCall, OBE, Secretary, Association of Metropolitan Authorities.
- John Charles McCarthy, Chairman, The Jack Hawkins Club.
- Eardley Harold Victor McDougall, Secretary, Institute of Chartered Accountants of Scotland.
- Henry Roger McKibbin, ERD. For services to Irish Rugby Football.
- George Philip Stewart Macpherson, OBE, TD. For services to Greenwich Hospital.
- Professor James Bennett Miller, TD, President, Rent Assessment Panel for Scotland.
- Edgar William John Mitchell, Professor of Physics, University of Reading.
- Eric Noel Mobbs, Director, M. L. Aviation Co. Ltd. For services to Export.
- Alexander Eric Moulton. Founder and Managing Director, Moulton Developments Ltd.
- Iris Murdoch (Jean Iris Bayley), Writer.
- Alfred Frederick Parker, lately Chairman, Higgs and Hill Group.
- Norman John Payne, OBE, Chief Executive, British Airports Authority.
- Algernon Frederick Seton Pollock, lately Secretary, Legal Aid, The Law Society.
- Charles Randolph Quirk, FBA, Quain Professor of English, University of London.
- Emrys Roberts, MBE, Chairman, Mid-Wales New Town Development Corporation.
- Robert Evan Roberts, lately General Secretary, Young Men's Christian Association.
- Lionel Keir Robinson, MC. For charitable services.
- Robert Scott Russell, Director, Letcombe Laboratory, Wantage, Agricultural Research Council.
- David Gerald Scholey, lately Deputy Chairman, Export Guarantees Advisory Council. For services to Export.
- Frederick Robert Scott, Chairman, Hops Marketing Board.
- Hugh Digorie Seccombe, Chairman, Seccombe, Marshall & Campion Ltd.
- Norman Shuttleworth, lately Chairman, Clothing and Allied Products Industry Training Board.
- Jack William Simpson, Special Adviser to Director General of Weapons (Army), Ministry of Defence.
- Kenneth Cameron Sinclair, OBE, lately Chief Executive, British Sugar Corporation Ltd.
- Jack Smart, Leader, Wakefield City Council.
- Alan Smith, DFC, DL, Chairman, Dawson International Ltd.
- Douglas Allenby Smith, Managing Director, Hamworthy Engineering Ltd. For services to Export.
- Harold Cumming Spear, Member, Electricity Council.
- Archibald Ian Balfour Stewart, OBE, President, Scottish Fishermen's Federation.
- Gaston Jack Strowger, Managing Director, Thorn Electrical Industries Ltd.
- George Walter Roberts Terry, QPM, Chief Constable, Sussex Police.
- Adam Thomson, Chairman and Chief Executive, British Caledonian Airways Ltd.
- John Henry Townsend, Director, Imperial Chemical Industries Ltd.
- John Waddell, Chairman, Local Enterprise Development Unit in Northern Ireland.
- John Stuart Whyte, Director, Purchasing and Supply, Telecommunications Headquarters, Post Office.
- William Kenneth Wilson, Director of Direct Works, City of Manchester.
- Archibald Anderson Winning, Chief Fire Officer, Hampshire Fire Brigade.

Diplomatic Service and Overseas List

- Robert Bazeth Blyth Simpson. For services to the British community in Argentina.
- John Ivor Burns, OBE, lately Senior Police Adviser, Government of Lesotho.
- David Kenneth Hay Dale, Secretary to the Cabinet, Seychelles.
- Ewart William Francis, OBE. For public services in Belize.
- John Frederick Campbell Gallaher, DSO, DFC. For services to British commercial interests and the British community in Pakistan.
- John Stephen Hepworth. For services to the British community in Argentina.
- Andrew Graham Stewart McCallum. For services to the British community in Japan.
- John Louis Marden. For services to commerce and the community in Hong Kong.
- Pao Yue-kong. For services to commerce and the community in Hong Kong.
- Norman Leonard Smith. For services to the British community and the tea industry in Bangladesh.
- Albert Henry Spire, Counsellor (Commercial) Her Majesty's Embassy, Madrid.
- Patrick Desmond Stobart, MBE, lately Her Majesty's Consul-General, Zurich.

Australian States

State of New South Wales

- Edward Herbert Farmer, ISO. For services to architecture.
- Professor Rupert Horace Myers, Vice-Chancellor, University of New South Wales.
- Vera Ramaciotti. For services to charity.

State of Victoria

- Councillor James Harvey Hamilton MacGregor-Dowsett, OBE, of East Geelong. For services to local government and the community.
- Leonard William Weickhardt, of Canterbury. For services to science and education.

State of Queensland

- Francis John McDonnell, of Hendra. For services to commerce and charity.
- Councillor Lesleigh George Windmell Smith, OBE, of Wondai. For services to local government and the community.

State of Western Australia

- Charles Robert McGlew. For services to agriculture.
- Kensit Walter George Miller. For services to the community, youth and sport.

==== Officer of the Order of the British Empire (OBE) ====
===== Military Division =====
Royal Navy

- Commander Eric Bradshaw.
- Commander Keith Henry Day.
- Commander David Charles William Elliott.
- Commander Peter Vandome Evans.
- Acting Commander Ronald Arthur Fisher.
- Surgeon Commander Philip Charles Fulford, MVO.
- Captain Thomas Eric Hennesey, VRD, Royal Naval Reserve.
- Commander Gordon Cyril Roberts.
- Commander Donald Macpherson Spiller.
- Commander Dennis Chancellor Barrington White.
- Commander (SD) Arthur Douglas Willcox.
- Commander Stanley Robert Cecil Wornham.

Army

- Colonel (Honorary) Geoffrey Slater Aspdin (75998), Army Cadet Force, Territorial and Army Volunteer Reserve (now retired).
- Lieutenant-Colonel (Local Colonel) John Philip Cross, MBE, (339928), 7th Duke of Edinburgh's Own Gurkha Rifles.
- Lieutenant-Colonel Robert Oswald Davies, MBE, (382017), Intelligence Corps.
- Lieutenant-Colonel (Acting) Henry John Downton (176004), Combined Cadet Force, Territorial and Army Volunteer Reserve.
- Lieutenant-Colonel Timothy William Hackworth (422428), Royal Corps of Signals.
- Major (Local Lieutenant Colonel) Gordon McKenzie Macdonald (358067), 2nd King Edward VII's Own Gurkha Rifles (The Sirmoor Rifles).
- Lieutenant-Colonel (Quartermaster) Norman Edward Macleod (364865), Royal Regiment of Artillery.
- Lieutenant-Colonel Edward John Mayo (416021), Royal Regiment of Artillery.
- Lieutenant-Colonel Bruce Christopher McDermott, MBE, (471573), Royal Army Medical Corps.
- Lieutenant-Colonel Robin Charles Middleton, (406536), 1st The Queen's Dragoon Guards.
- Lieutenant-Colonel James Ellerby Pell (430414), The Duke of Wellington's Regiment (West Riding).
- Lieutenant-Colonel Neil Victor Ridgley Simpson, TD, (438723), 51st Highland Volunteers, Territorial and Army Volunteer Reserve.
- Lieutenant-Colonel Jon Leopold Sutro, MC, (393889), The Queen's Royal Irish Hussars.
- Lieutenant-Colonel Kenneth Peter Walker, TD, (456212), Royal Army Medical Corps, Territorial and Army Volunteer Reserve.
- Lieutenant-Colonel Patrick Anthony Winter, MBE, (314079), The Royal Irish Rangers (27th (Inniskilling) 83rd and 87th).
- Lieutenant-Colonel Alan Graham Wooldridge (403739), The Royal Regiment of Fusiliers.

Overseas Award

- Lieutenant-Colonel John Rule Heywood, ED, The Royal Hong Kong Regiment (The Volunteers).

Royal Air Force

- Acting Group Captain David Darling.
- Wing Commander Eric John Baker (156359).
- Wing Commander Ian Speed Balderstone (579021).
- Wing Commander (now Group Captain) Kenneth Sydney Booth, AFC, (63478), (retired).
- Wing Commander John Frank Brazier (4159441).
- Wing Commander Ian Hunter Forster (504979).
- Wing Commander Gwyn Griffiths (173600).
- Wing Commander Brian William Lavender, AFC, (3516265).
- Wing Commander David Frank Lawrence (5043690).
- Wing Commander (now Group Captain) David Bruce Leech (4143081).
- Wing Commander Richard Albert Miller (5037273).
- Wing Commander Dennis Roy Perrin, DFC, (149082).
- Wing Commander Ronald Charles Wood, AFC, (607161).

===== Civil Division =====
- Rodney Murison Addison, Vice-Chairman, National Savings Committee for Scotland.
- Allan Aitken, Director, Product Development, Ford Motor Co. Ltd.
- Archibald Ernest Aitkins, Chairman and Managing Director, Tilhill Forestry Group.
- John Hunter Allen, President, Association of Local Authorities of Northern Ireland.
- William Mackintosh Allen, TD, lately Secretary, Advisory Board of Accountancy Education.
- Mary McKinney Devine Barclay, District Councillor, Strathkelvin District Council.
- Isabella Eveline Macleod Barron, Editor and Proprietor, The Inverness Courier.
- Clifford Alfred Frederic Beaumont, Chief Accountant, London Electricity Board.
- John Christopher Beck, Technical Adviser, Ministry of Defence.
- Thomas William Blackford Beddow, Councillor, Staffordshire County and Stoke-on-Trent City Councils.
- Joseph Blake, Divisional Manager, Short Range Weapons Division, Hatfield, Hawker Siddeley Dynamics.
- Ernest Radcliffe Bond, QPM, Deputy Assistant Commissioner, Metropolitan Police.
- The Reverend Alan Richard Booth, lately Director, Christian Aid.
- Gordon Malcolm Booth, Deputy Keeper, National Gallery.
- John Dick Livingston Booth, Director, Charities Aid Foundation.
- George Bosomworth, Headmaster, Walbottle High School, Newcastle.
- David Merrick Boston, Curator, Horniman Museum and Library.
- Matthew Boyd, Principal, Greenmount Agricultural and Horticultural College, Department of Agriculture for Northern Ireland.
- Ralph Brain, News Editor, Oxford Mail and Times.
- Kenneth Charles Bridges, QFSM, Chief Fire Officer, Berkshire Fire Brigade.
- Herbert Frank Broad, lately Headmaster, The Cedars School, Leighton Buzzard.
- Kenneth Bryan, lately Principal, Department of Employment.
- James Buckley, Chairman, Sandes Soldiers and Airmen's Homes.
- John Burroughs, President, The Golf Foundation.
- George Butterworth, Director, Acrow (Engineers) Ltd.
- Thomas Bartlett Buyers, lately Director of Engineering, Department of Energy.
- The Reverend Paul Laurence Byrne, Director, Shelter Housing Aid Centre.
- Peter Henry Calder, Programme Director, Olympus 593, Rolls-Royce (1971) Ltd.
- Alistair Bromley Campbell, Vice-Chairman, Countryside Commission for Scotland.
- Frederic Bruce Moodie Campbell, lately Chairman, Berkshire, Buckinghamshire and Oxfordshire Naturalists' Trust.
- Caroline Isabel Mary Carlyle, lately Principal, Department of Employment.
- Patrick Maurice George Carter, TD, Senior Principal, Ministry of Defence.
- Peter Chapman, Chairman, Northamptonshire Small Industries Committee, Council for Small Industries in Rural Areas.
- Joseph Henry John Chinnock, Chief Safety Officer (H.Q.), British Gas Corporation.
- Irene Mabel Clark, Area Nursing Officer, Suffolk Area Health Authority.
- John Esmond Cyril Clarke, DL, Chairman, Avon and Bristol Federation of Boys' Clubs.
- Arthur Edward Clifford, Director of Programmes, Tyne Tees Television Ltd.
- Peter John Conder, Director, The Royal Society for the Protection of Birds.
- George Uvedale Spencer Corbett, Investigator I, Royal Commission on Historical Monuments (England).
- Harry Corbett, Entertainer. For charitable services.
- Harry H. Corbett, (Harry Corbett) Actor.
- John Thomas Corbett, General Medical Practitioner. For services to medicine in Wellingborough and district.
- Charles Burgess Cotton, Director, Burgess Products Co. (Holdings) Ltd.
- William Frederick Cotton, Head, Light Entertainment Group, Television, British Broadcasting Corporation.
- Betty Cowell, Principal, Midwife Teachers Training College, Kingston upon Thames.
- Brigadier Bernard Turing Vionnée Cowey, DSO, DL, Secretary, Council of Territorial Auxiliary and Volunteer Reserve Associations.
- Alexander Crawford, Director, Personnel Development and Services, British Steel Corporation.
- Robert Mason Creer, Superintending Engineer, Property Services Agency, Department of the Environment.
- Harold John Cutler, Managing Director, Chiltern Hunt Ltd.
- Gilbert Lawrence Daley, Chairman, General Dental Services Committee, British Dental Association.
- Elizabeth David. For services to cookery.
- Stanley William Day, Chairman, Proprietary Association of Great Britain.
- Anthony Lee De Silva, Assistant Senior Medical Officer, South East Thames Regional Health Authority.
- Harold Edwyn Dibben, Deputy General Manager, Springfields Works, British Nuclear Fuels Ltd.
- Allen Dinsdale, Director of Research, British Ceramic Research Association.
- Edith Florence Dobson, Secretary, The Japan Society of London.
- Lieutenant-Colonel Denis Marshall Dorr, TD. For services to the community in Wellingborough.
- Lieutenant-Commander John Arthur Douglas, MBE, Royal Navy (Retd.), Chief Inspector, HM Coastguard, Department of Trade.
- Cyril Dowler. For services to the Grand Order of Water Rats' charities.
- Jacqueline Mary du Pré (Mrs. Barenboim), Violoncellist.
- Franklyn Edmonds, President, British Amateur Gymnastics Association.
- Hylton Edmondson, Chief Engineer, SS Marticia, Shell Tankers (UK) Ltd.
- James Farquharson, Governor, Moray House College of Education, Edinburgh.
- Arthur Edmund Ford, Head, Submarine Systems Division, Network Planning Department, Telecommunications Headquarters, Post Office.
- Elsie May Foulds, MBE. For services to the Royal British Legion in the North East.
- Felicity Lane Fox. For services to disabled people.
- Leslie Frodin, Chairman, John West Foods Ltd.
- James Garden, Consultant Orthopaedic Surgeon and Surgeon in Charge of Accident and Emergency Service, Law Hospital, Carluke.
- Robert Campbell Garry, FRSE, lately Member, Flying Personnel Research Committee.
- Daphne Irvine Prideaux Gask. For services to the magistracy in Shropshire.
- Stanley Walter Gavey, Jurat, Royal Court of Guernsey.
- Henry William Gibbs, Boxing Referee.
- Ronald Stuart Johnson-Gilbert, Secretary, Royal College of Surgeons of England.
- Kenneth Gill, Principal, Portland Training College for the Disabled, Mansfield.
- Harold Marks Glass, lately Director, Research, British Standards Institution.
- Nathan Goldenberg, lately Member, Food Additives and Contaminants Committee.
- Derek Stanley Gordon, Consultant Neuro-Surgeon, Eastern Health and Social Services Board, Belfast.
- Miriam Aurelia Gough, lately Principal Nursing Officer (Education), University Hospital of Wales.
- Peter Ernest Gough, Director, Components Division, Muirhead Ltd.
- Christina Florent Grace, (Sister Christina), Educational Adviser, Order of the Sisters of St. Paul.
- Andrew Kirkwood Grant, Senior Principal, Department for National Savings.
- Doreen Lilian Green, Headmistress, Lewis Comprehensive School for Girls, Ystrad Mynach.
- Geoffrey Arthur Reginald Green, MBE, Sports Writer and Broadcaster.
- Jonah Griffiths, Assistant Commissioner, Crown Estate Office.
- John Douglas Hacon, Superintending Civil Engineer, Property Services Agency, Department of the Environment.
- Professor Walter Hagenbuch. For services to Wages Councils.
- Alexander James Haggart, Potato Grower and Merchant, Perthshire.
- David Arthur Haig, Senior Principal Scientific Officer, Institute for Research on Animal Diseases, Compton, Agricultural Research Council.
- Paul Hubert Walter Haile, Head, Road Safety Division, The Royal Society for the Prevention of Accidents.
- Kathleen Hale (Mrs. McClean), Author and Artist.
- Morris Hardy, lately Clerk of the Sheriff Court, District of Dundee.
- Kenneth Frederick Brian Hempel, Restorer I, Victoria and Albert Museum.
- Ivan Edward Hills, Chief Agent, The National Trust.
- Colonel Denis Arthur Sydenham Houghton, TD, DL, Chairman, Lancashire Branch, Council for the Protection of Rural England.
- Geoffrey Luther Howe, lately Master, Royal Research Ship, Discovery.
- Herbert Raymond Hoy, Assistant Director, Leatherhead Laboratories, National Coal Board.
- James Barlow Hurst, Director of Operations, Tyne and Wear Passenger Transport Executive.
- Margery Hurst, Joint Chairman and Managing Director, Brook Street Bureau of Mayfair Ltd. For charitable services.
- May Jackson, County Superintendent, Northumbria, St. John Ambulance Brigade.
- George Albert Jarrold, Senior Inspector of Taxes, Board of Inland Revenue.
- William George Jewers, Director of Finance, British Gas Corporation.
- Nina Mary Elizabeth Joachim, lately Principal, St. Hild's College, Durham.
- Albert John, lately Chairman, Council for the Principality of Wales.
- James Kennedy, DL, Chairman, Trustee Savings Bank of South of Scotland
- The Reverend Prebendary Thomas Phoebus Kerfoot, MBE, General Secretary, The Missions to Seamen.
- George Reymond Kitteringham, Senior Principal Scientific Officer, Department of Health and Social Security.
- Francis Lagan, MBE, Assistant Chief Constable, Royal Ulster Constabulary.
- Anne-Louise Laing, lately Deputy Chief Commissioner, Girl Guides Association.
- Harold Lambert, Member, Sheffield District Council.
- Mabel Lillian Lee, MBE. For services to the community in Gwent.
- Ernest Charles Letley, Principal Professional and Technology Officer, HM Naval Base, Rosyth, Ministry of Defence.
- Francis Benjamin Levetus, lately Technical Director, Keelavite Hydraulics Ltd.
- Laurier Lister, lately Director and Administrator, Yvonne Arnaud Theatre, Guildford.
- Norman Peter Lister, Member, Coventry Education Committee.
- Lloyd Robert Lorimer, Area Administrator, Bradford Area Health Authority.
- Eric Walter Lowden, Deputy Chief Executive, British Airways Board.
- Evelyn Irene Sophie Phipps Lucas, County Secretary, Dorset Soldiers', Sailors' and Airmen's Families Association.
- Derek Kingsmill Lyons, Managing Director, Industrial and Trade Fairs Holdings Ltd. For services to Export.
- Sybilla Mary de Symons McCallum, Member, Divisional Social Services Committee, Kesteven.
- Norman Wall McCaw, TD, Member, Wessex Regional Health Authority.
- Frank Calder Macdonald, Senior Principal, Ministry of Defence.
- Ronald Lenox Ogilvie Macfarlane, lately Assistant Controller II, The British Council.
- Lorna Machell, Principal, Department of the Environment.
- Donald McLeman McIntosh, Member, Grampian Health Board.
- Eric William Macintyre, QFSM, Firemaster, Northern Area Fire Brigade.
- Charles Macleod, Headmaster, Shawbost Secondary School, Isle of Lewis.
- Bessie Hamill Maconachie, DL. For public services in Northern Ireland.
- Henry Mansfield, Chairman, Local and Public Authorities Savings Committee, Wales.
- Alfred Edward Marks, Actor.
- The Reverend David Michael Mason, Chairman, South Metropolitan Conciliation Committee, Race Relations Board.
- Dennis Stewart Mayo, Director, Ewbank & Partners Ltd.
- Alan Cotton Meigh, Managing Director, Soil Mechanics Ltd.
- John Menheneott, MBE, Regional Marketing Director, Yorkshire Sales Region, National Coal Board.
- Francis John Clark Mennell, Foreign and Commonwealth Office.
- Joseph Mercer. For services to Association Football in England.
- Paul Millett, DSC, Chief Test Pilot, Military Aircraft Division, British Aircraft Corporation Ltd.
- Richard Mills, Deputy Director, United Kingdom and British Commonwealth Branch, Calouste Gulbenkian Foundation.
- Frederick Cattell Millward, lately Senior Principal, Home Office.
- George Milne. For services to Anglo-Malawian understanding.
- Cecil Ernest Morris, Secretary, The Medical College, St. Bartholomew's Hospital.
- Trevor Morris, DFM, Secretary, The Football Association of Wales.
- James Munn, Rector, Cathkin High School, Cambuslang, Glasgow.
- Dorette Nelson Neal, Secretary, Midland Counties' Women's Amateur Athletics Association.
- Sidney George Newland, MBE. For services to the Barristers' Clerks' Association.
- Wycliffe Noble, Chairman, Kingston upon Thames Association for the Disabled.
- Ignatius John O'Hea, Chairman, Colt International and associated companies Ltd. For services to Export.
- Raymond Lancelot Ollerenshaw, Chairman of Advisory Committee, Great House Experimental Husbandry Farm.
- Norman George Painting, Writer and Broadcaster.
- Norman Parker, Principal, Hertfordshire College of Building.
- Roy Cowell Parry, Manager, Government Services Division, Mullard Ltd. For services to Export.
- Margaret Kathleen Patrick, Superintendent Physiotherapist, Birmingham General Hospital.
- Harold Nathan Pitstow, MBE, Secretary, Westminster Abbey Bell Ringers.
- David Anthony Cantrill Price, VRD. For services to The Seamen's Hospital Society.
- Arthur George Puckering, QPM, Chief Constable, Durham Constabulary.
- Frances Mary Pugh. For services to the community in Devon.
- Harold Frederick Purchase, General Manager (Planning) and Director, Legal & General Assurance Society Ltd.
- Ernest Philip Quibell, Medical Administrator, Chailey Heritage, Lewes.
- Matthew Quinn, Member, Grimsby Borough Council.
- Alan Herbert Randall, Chairman, Water Committee, Anglian Water Authority.
- Nicholas Patrick Reyntiens, Artist craftsman in stained glass.
- Meredydd Roberts, Farm Director (Grade I), Ministry of Agriculture, Fisheries and Food.
- John Albert Robinson, Director, West Country Tourist Board.
- Robert William George Rose, Managing Director, Penny & Giles Conductive Plastics Ltd.
- Robert Routledge, General Manager, British Ropes Ltd.
- Kenneth William Seaman, Principal, Department of Energy.
- Beatrice Sharrard, Member, Nottinghamshire County Council.
- Geoffrey Sinkinson, lately Principal Civil Engineer, South Wales, Forestry Commission.
- Ben Smith, Member, Local Government Staff Commission Scotland.
- Thomas Leonard Smith, lately Senior Principal Scientific Officer, Royal Aircraft Establishment, Farnborough, Ministry of Defence.
- Stanley Lester Speight, Chairman and Managing Director, Neepsend Ltd. For services to Export.
- James Ramsay Spence, Managing Director, Weir Pumps Ltd., Glasgow.
- Geoffrey Charles Stebbing, Chief Executive, British Electrical and Allied Manufacturers Association.
- Wilfrid Ernest Donnington Stephens, lately Chief Education Officer, London Borough of Waltham Forest.
- Walter Robert Stevens. For services to Lighting.
- Captain George Osborn Symonds, DSC, Royal Navy (Retd.), lately Chairman, The Association of Royal Navy Officers.
- Joan Veronica Symons, Head Teacher, Kingsthorpe Grove Infants School, Northampton.
- Clifford Ronald Vivien Tandy, Landscape Architect.
- William Arthur Taylor, MC, City Librarian, Birmingham.
- Robert Auriol Benton Thomas, Vice-Chairman, Staffordshire Area Health Authority.
- Howard Eric Thompson, Deputy Music Director, The Arts Council of Great Britain.
- Margaret Winifred Towler, Headmistress, Court Lodge County Secondary School, Horley.
- Jean Joan Juno Tuckett, Regional Administrator, South Western Region, Women's Royal Voluntary Service.
- John Race Tully, County Engineer and Surveyor, Durham County Council.
- Geoffrey Gilyard Unsworth, Director of Photography (Film Industry).
- Andrew Murray Urquhart, Chairman, Bristol Old People's Welfare Incorporated.
- Pauline Annie Isabella Vick, Area Nursing Officer, Nottinghamshire Area Health Authority.
- Hugh Waring, Managing Director, Northern Ireland Railways Co. Ltd.
- Vivienne Violet Belle Warters, Secretary, Clergy Orphan Corporation.
- John Bruton Wells, Assistant Controller, Board of Inland Revenue.
- John Arthur Wheeler, Chairman, Warrington National Insurance Local Tribunal.
- Charles Jim Whitehead, Chief Accountant, British Red Cross Society.
- Alexander Whittle, Principal, Board of Customs and Excise.
- David Wigman. For services to the Association of Jewish ex-Servicemen and Women.
- Henry Cephas Wilkinson. For services to the community and particularly in the development of the Arts in the Isle of Man.
- Mary Lewis Williams, Senior Principal, Lord Chancellor's Department.
- Edgar Wrayford Willmer, TD, DL. For services to the community in Birkenhead.
- Annie Wright, Senior District Inspector, Manchester Local Education Authority.
- Frederick Matthew Wright, MBE, General Manager, Western Region, British Railways Board.
- Colin Young, Director, National Film School.

===== Diplomatic Service and Overseas List =====
- Alexander Young Allan. For services to agricultural development in Kenya.
- David Robert Avery, First Secretary (Consular), British High Commission, Nairobi.
- The Reverend Canon Sidney John Baggott. For services to the Church and the British community in Switzerland.
- John Howard Bamforth, lately Chairman, Public Services Commission, Bahamas.
- Annie Huldah Bodden. For public services in the Cayman Islands.
- John Henry Bremridge. For public services in Hong Kong.
- Hugh George Brind, TD, Director of Roads, Ministry of Works and Supplies, Malawi.
- Wilfred Samuel Burgess. For services to the British community in New York.
- Basil Richard Ryland Butler. For services to British commercial interests in Kuwait.
- Leslie David Casbon, MBE. For services to education and the British community in Ethiopia.
- James Chalmers. For services to the British community in Malawi.
- Ian Mackinnon Churcher. For services to British interests in the Netherlands.
- Winifred Annie Coate, MBE. For services to the community in Jordan.
- Mary Josephine Cosyn. For services to education in Paris.
- Derrick John Coupland. For services to British interests in Singapore and to Anglo-Singaporean relations.
- Geoffrey Laurence Cramp, Chief Planning Officer, Ministry of Local Government, Malawi.
- John Frederick Dalrymple. For services to the British community in Mexico.
- Murray Dickie. For services to Anglo-Austrian cultural relations.
- Colin Thompson Fairless. For services to the British community in Uruguay.
- Herbert George Farbrother. For services to cotton research and development in Sudan.
- Allan Fletcher, Director of Marine, Hong Kong.
- Donald Alexander Morton Gebbie. For services to medicine in Kenya and to Anglo-Kenyan relations.
- Marcus James Gent. For services to the community and to commerce in Malaysia.
- Alec Lindow Gillibrand. For services to commerce and the British community in Saudi Arabia.
- Frank Phillips Glibbery. For services to the British community in Portugal.
- Paul Bevan Gotch, lately British Council Representative in the Lebanon.
- Michael Mytton Grainger. For services to the British community in Paris.
- Donald Coynach Grant. For services to the British community and to British interests in Madrid.
- Olwen Phillis Frances Hackett. For services to Anglo-Libyan cultural relations.
- Ruth Charwotte Hanbury. For services to the British community in Alassio and to Anglo-Italian relations.
- William John Hoy, MBE, Permanent Secretary, Public Service, Belize.
- David Howard Humphreys. For services to education and the British community in Cyprus.
- Lawrence Johnstone. For services to the British community in Tokyo and to Anglo-Japanese relations.
- David Nanau Kausimae. For services to the community in the Solomon Islands.
- Michael David Kendall-Carpenter. For services to communications and the community in the Cayman Islands.
- Wilfred Thomas Knight, Director of Water Supplies, Hong Kong.
- Ian Marian Leopold Kowal. For services to agricultural development in Nigeria.
- Audrey Beryl Lambert, British Council Deputy Representative, Iran.
- Cecil John Lang, MBE, Chief Executive, Water Utilities Corporation, Botswana.
- John Kenneth Law. For services to British commercial interests in Spain.
- Lo Tak-shing. For public services in Hong Kong.
- Victor Cecil Martin, lately Special Adviser to the British High Commissioner, New Delhi.
- Eileen Nora Mendt. For services to education and the British community in Venezuela.
- Mona Eliza Monplaisir. For services to the community in St. Lucia.
- Gilbert Allen Morris, First Secretary, Her Majesty's Embassy, Madrid.
- Douglas Roy Morrison, Deputy Chief Secretary, Falkland Islands.
- John David Owen, Financial Controller, Commercial Corporation, Swaziland.
- Eleanor Elizabeth Anne Ponsonby. For services to health education in Malawi.
- Henry Thomas Putnam. For services to British commercial interests in Italy.
- Leslie Walter Verdun Raybould, Her Majesty's Consul (Commercial), British Consulate-General, Stuttgart.
- Richard John Reger. For services to British commercial interests and the community in Cameroon.
- Colin John Richards. For services to British commercial interests and the British community in Turkey.
- Peter Clifton Richards. For services to Anglo-Philippine relations.
- Hazel Beatrice Coleby Roberts, First Secretary, Her Majesty's Embassy, Tel Aviv.
- Lorna Ruth Milner Robinson, MBE. For welfare services to the community in Dominica.
- Henry Augustus Rogers, MBE, lately Her Majesty's Consul (Commercial), British Consulate-General, Luanda.
- Trevor John Rutter, lately British Council Representative, Thailand.
- Dennis Edward Sandall, Director of Customs and Excise, Botswana.
- Francis Bertram Sedgwick-Jell, First Secretary (Commercial), British High Commission, Dacca.
- Athol John Dundas Simpson. For services to British commercial interests and to the British community in Iran.
- John Henry Southwell. For services to the development of technical education in Burma.
- Daniel Alexander Stewart. For services to British commercial interests in Kenya.
- Herbert Horatio Stewart, lately First Secretary (Aid), British High Commission, Lagos.
- Francis Peter Sword Strickland. For services to British Commercial interests in Bahrain.
- Monsignor James Sullivan, lately Rector of the English College, Lisbon.
- Percy Forrest Talbot. For services to the British community in Argentina.
- Philip Malcolm Tibble. For services to the British community in Colombia and to Anglo-Colombian relations.
- Roger William Varian. For services to British commercial interests in Iran.
- Joyce Frances Veasey, MBE, First Secretary and Consul, Her Majesty's Embassy, Paris.
- Derek George Williams. For services to the British community in Argentina.
- The Reverend Edward James Wilson-Hughes. For welfare services to seamen in Durban.
- Victor Ralph Winton. For services to British commercial interests in Bahrain.
- Keith Woodward, MBE, Senior Assistant Secretary, British Service, New Hebrides Condominium.
- Edward Leighton Yates. For services to education in developing countries.
- Susan Yuen. For public services in Hong Kong.

===== Australian States =====
State of New South Wales

- Donald Edmund Anderson. For services to medicine.
- Earle Harold Bastian. For services to dentistry.
- June Bronhill. In recognition of service to the performing arts.
- Tim Charles John Caldwell, BEM. For services to sport.
- Mary, Lady Fairfax. For services to the community.
- Professor Leonie Judith Kramer (Mrs. Harold Kramer), Professor of Australian Literature, University of Sydney.
- Rea Chadwick Langdon. For services to ex-servicemen.
- The Honourable Finlay Melrose MacDiarmid, MLC. For services to primary industry.
- John Barrett McInerney. For services to commerce and the community.
- William George Martin, MBE. For services to the community.
- William Berge Phillips. For services to sport and the community.
- The Honourable Stanley Tunstall Stephens. For services to the State.
- Ian Roger Vanderfield. For services to medicine and sport.

State of Victoria

- Norman Peter Andrews, of Toorak. For services to the community.
- Robert Bruce Ewart, of Canterbury. For services to ex-servicemen, particularly the blinded, the partially blinded and their dependants.
- Alexander George Gillon, of West Brunswick. For services to football and the community.
- Edmund William Radcliffe Grace, of Camberwell. For services to hospital administration.
- Councillor David Aloysius McKenzie-McHarg, of Beechworth. For municipal and community services.
- Peter Lawrence Quirk Norris, of Toorak. For services to the community, particularly to hospitals.
- Roy Duncan O'Brien, of Shepparton. For services to local government and the community.
- Lesley Valentine Westmoreland, of Balwyn. For services to the Young Women's Christian Association.

State of Queensland

- James Brough, of Esk. For services to the dairying industry and local government.
- Councillor Clement Edmund Francis, of Charleville. For services in local government and to charity.
- David John Lambert, of Isle of Capri. For services to commerce and charity.
- Charles Maurice Lisner, of Yeronga. For services to the ballet and charity.
- Councillor Hugh Dunstan Muntz, of Pimpama. For services to local government.

State of Western Australia

- John Birman. For services to the community in the fields of adult education, art, drama and music.
- (Matron) Beryl Grant. For services to the community and nursing.
- William Steel Paterson, JP. For services to the community.

==== Member of the Order of the British Empire (MBE) ====
Military Division

Royal Navy

- Lieutenant Commander John Buckley Pullivant Causley, VRD, Royal Naval Reserve.
- Lieutenant Commander (SD) Harold Edward James Davies.
- Temporary Lieutenant (SD) Charles James Fox.
- Lieutenant (Local Captain) (SD) John Stephen Ingram, Royal Marines.
- Lieutenant (CS) Donald Vesey Lister Kaye, Royal Marines.
- Fleet Chief Writer John Stuart Kerr, M853699V.
- Fleet Chief Wren Regulating Janet Frances King, WO79218E.
- Lieutenant Commander Peter William Lindley.
- Lieutenant Commander (SD) John Main, RD, Royal Naval Reserve.
- Lieutenant Commander Peter Edward Rous Moore.
- Lieutenant (SD) Eric Curwen Singleton.
- Lieutenant Commander Frank Smith.
- Lieutenant Commander Albert Robert Victor Thompson.
- Acting Lieutenant Commander (SD) Joseph Edward Thompson.
- Lieutenant Commander (SCC) Hugh Todkill, Royal Naval Reserve.

Army

- Major (Queen's Gurkha Officer) Aite Gurung, MVO, (475697), Gurkha Transport Regiment.
- Major Peter Edward Andrews (432904), Corps of Royal Engineers.
- Major John Michael O'Reilly Bassett (406226), Royal Army Ordnance Corps.
- Major (Quartermaster) Hugh Burroughs (474649), The Queen's Royal Irish Hussars.
- Major Ian Gordon Stewart Cartwright (457126), The Royal Highland Fusiliers (Princess Margaret's Own Glasgow and Ayrshire Regiment).
- Major (Acting) Robert Colhoun (426557), Army Cadet Force, Territorial and Army Volunteer Reserve.
- Major Michael Antony Everitt (326636), Royal Regiment of Artillery.
- Major (Acting) David Hartley Ferguson (404204), Army Cadet Force, Territorial and Army Volunteer Reserve.
- Major Geoffrey William Field (470066), Corps of Royal Engineers.
- Major Maurice Aloysius French (411947), The Royal Regiment of Fusiliers.
- Major James Gustavus Hamilton-Russell (456237), The Blues and Royals (Royal Horse Guards and 1st Dragoons).
- 22978058 Warrant Officer Class I Terence Francis Hammond, Army Physical Training Corps.
- 22781585 Warrant Officer Class 1 Eric Ronald Harper, The Royal Regiment of Wales (24th/41st Foot).
- Major Jim Woolford Isaacs, TD, (444977), Royal Corps of Signals, Territorial and Army Volunteer Reserve.
- Captain (Quartermaster) Peter Francis Willis Jackson (486981), Corps of Royal Engineers.
- Captain (Acting) Alfred Jones (351396), Army Cadet Force, Territorial and Army Volunteer Reserve.
- Captain (Quartermaster) Peter Arnold Lewis (487628), Grenadier Guards.
- Major Ian Aikman Maclachlan (366833), The Royal Scots (The Royal Regiment).
- Major (Local Lieutenant-Colonel) Geoffrey Mason (411081), The Queen's Regiment.
- Major Ian Mather McAdam, TD, (466244), Corps of Royal Engineers, Territorial and Army Volunteer Reserve.
- Major (Quartermaster) Thomas McClements, TD, (455988), Royal Regiment of Artillery, Territorial and Army Volunteer Reserve.
- 23864200 Warrant Officer Class 2 Kenneth Moore, Intelligence Corps.
- Major Kenneth John Norsworthy (462785), Royal Army Ordnance Corps.
- Major Peter Frederick Packham (470128), The Queen's Regiment.
- Major Raymond Austin Pett (469078), The Queen's Lancashire Regiment.
- Major Evan David Powell-Jones (465821), 6th Queen Elizabeth's Own Gurkha Rifles.
- Captain John Wallace Rainey (494747), Corps of Royal Engineers.
- Major Richard Noel Randell (112949), The Royal Regiment of Wales (24th/41st Foot) (Now Retired).
- 23498434 Warrant Officer Class 1 Alan Rennison, Royal Army Ordnance Corps.
- Captain (Quartermaster) Jack Cowduck Riordan (484078), The Green Howards (Alexandra, Princess of Wales's Own Yorkshire Regiment).
- Major (Quartermaster) Gordon Schofield (479594), Royal Corps of Signals.
- Major Robert Scott (467660), The Royal Regiment of Fusiliers, Territorial and Army Volunteer Reserve.
- Captain (Acting Major) Patrick Frank Shervington (479345), The Royal Anglian Regiment.
- Major Peter Shield (443632), Royal Corps of Transport.
- Major Patrick Phillip Dennant Stone (461965), The Royal Anglian Regiment.
- Major Margaret Stephenson (460072), Queen Alexandra's Royal Army Nursing Corps.
- Major Christopher Harold Van Der Noot (463410), The Gordon Highlanders.
- 23661980 Warrant Officer Class 1 Edward James Walker, Royal Army Ordnance Corps.
- Major (Now Lieutenant-Colonel) Peter John Warren (437196), Royal Army Ordnance Corps.
- Captain (Acting Major) Dennis Williams (487382), The Royal Green Jackets.
- Major Patrick Erlin Wood (459340), The Parachute Regiment.

Royal Air Force

- Acting Wing Commander Norman John Grosvenor Hodnett (3521942).
- Squadron Leader Frederick William Fielding, AFC, (3051105).
- Squadron Officer Margaret Joyce Frude (407674), Princess Mary's Royal Air Force Nursing Service.
- Squadron Leader Mervyn Goldstein (505447).
- Squadron Leader Robert William Kimmings (1269552).
- Squadron Leader Alan Francis Nicholas (4011644).
- Squadron Leader Peter George Payne (571929).
- Squadron Leader George Malcolm Perrin (4091468).
- Squadron Leader Richard Thomas Popple (2459967).
- Squadron Leader Aleksander Stanislaw Tarwid (794978).
- Acting Squadron Leader Jack Middleton (579893).
- Flight Lieutenant Derek Guy Amos (585267).
- Flight Lieutenant Peter Graham Wilson Bedwin (686081).
- Flight Lieutenant John Robert Caley (202993), RAF Regiment.
- Flight Lieutenant Leonard Waite (4115065).
- Flight Lieutenant Adam Nugent Wise (2617194).
- Acting Flight Lieutenant Thomas Peter Hodgson (58138), Royal Air Force Volunteer Reserve (Training Branch).
- Warrant Officer Brian Cowell (S0592825).
- Warrant Officer Reginald Eves (B1399576).
- Warrant Officer Michael Goucher (F0592888).
- Warrant Officer John Llewellyn Griffiths (W1590928).
- Warrant Officer Roy Deland Landry (Q1723593).
- Warrant Officer John Morris (E3062773).
- Warrant Officer William Edward Ponsford (S1633632).
- Warrant Officer Herbert Rawcliffe (X0653590).
- Warrant Officer Ronald Frederick Tooke, BEM, (M0644986).
- Master Navigator Robin Alfred Dedmen (K4041673).
- Master Navigator Campbell Andrew Johnston (E3504593).
- Master Air Electronics Operator David Evan Lewis (V1294559).

Civil Division

- David Addey, Chairman, South East Lindsey Savings Committee.
- John Allison. For services to the Teesdale District Council.
- James William Anderson, Master, MV Hounslow, Sludge Vessel Service, Thames Water Authority.
- Dorothy Appleton, Clerical Officer, Home Office.
- William Graham Ashton, Deputy Chief Constable, Cleveland Constabulary.
- William Baird, Higher Executive Officer, Board of Customs and Excise.
- Francis Frederick Baker. For services to the Amalgamated Society of Boilermakers.
- Arthur Robert Bartle, Professional and Technology Officer Grade I, Civil Service Department.
- Beatrice Vera Chedzey Batts, lately Executive Officer, Applied Psychology Unit, Cambridge, Medical Research Council.
- Edward Moir Beattie, Observer Lieutenant, No. 28 Group, Dundee, Royal Observer Corps.
- Percy Douglas Betteridge, Experimental Instrumentation Engineer, Hawker Siddeley Aviation Ltd.
- Charles William Bird, Works Manager, Norprint Ltd.
- Edna Margaret Blair, Senior Clerical Assistant, Scarcroft, Yorkshire Electricity Board.
- Ruth Mary Aspinall Boothroyd, Secretary, Stockport Chamber of Commerce and Industry, and Stockport Chamber of Trade.
- Mary Bourne, Vice-Chairman, Social Services Committee, Stoke-on-Trent.
- James Ernest Skidmore Bradbury, Station Officer, Gwynedd Fire Brigade.
- James Henry Bradley, Inspector of Taxes (Higher Grade), Board of Inland Revenue.
- Harry Breeze, DFC, Area Service Manager, West Area, Wales Region, British Gas Corporation.
- Helen Scott Brett, Senior Nursing Officer, Operating Departments, Liverpool Area Health Authority.
- Brian Brinkley. For services to Swimming.
- Arnold John Brown, Engineering Project Manager, Sperry Gyroscope Company, Bracknell.
- John Brown, Superintendent of Works, Department of Finance, Northern Ireland.
- Nathaniel Munro Bruce, Higher Executive Officer, Animal Breeding Research Organisation, Edinburgh, Agricultural Research Council.
- Dorothy Mary Bryant. For services to the community in Torquay.
- Thomas Hedley Buchanon, Chief Superintendent, Royal Ulster Constabulary.
- Walter Edward Gordon Bungey, Secretary, No. 1105 (Winchester) Squadron, Air Training Corps.
- Mary Ethel Burke, lately Nursing Sister, Bury General Hospital, Bury Area Health Authority.
- Norman Burley, Head, Maintenance Division, Middlesbrough Telephone Area, North Eastern Telecommunications Region, Post Office.
- Eric Gordon Burrows, General Adviser, Multi-racial Education, Bedfordshire County Council.
- Robert John Bushell, Area Works Officer, Devon Area Health Authority.
- Frank Butcher, Assistant Director (Council & Support Committees), Humberside County Council.
- Percival Stephen Cairns, National Welfare Consultant, National Federation of Far Eastern Prisoners of War Clubs and Associations.
- Robert Cairns, Supervising Examiner, Department of the Environment.
- Gerard Campbell, Regional Collector, Board of Inland Revenue.
- Eric Grenville Chambers, Director, Bradford & Sons Ltd.
- Mary Doreen Chandler, Matron, Urquhart House Children's Home, Houston, Renfrewshire.
- Clifford Brownlow Chapman, Secretary, Hartlepool Savings Committee.
- Thomas Chapman, lately Industrial Liaison Officer, Board for Social Responsibility, General Synod of the Church of England.
- Arthur James Chester, lately Head of Immigrants Department, Hallam Junior School, Sandwell.
- Evelyn Christie, lately Area Secretary, East Scotland, King George's Fund for Sailors.
- Albert Ernest Clark, QPM, Chairman, Northallerton League of Friends.
- Thomas Frederick Cleaver, Chairman, Stafford Disablement Advisory Committee.
- James Stanley Cliff, Chairman Electrical Engineering Committee, West Midlands Advisory Council for Further Education.
- Marjorie Mary Cobb, Clerical Officer, Department of Health and Social Security.
- Eileen Constance Connor, lately County and District Organiser, Huntingdon, Women's Royal Voluntary Service.
- Ethel Mina Cooper, Member, Greater Manchester and Lancashire Rent Assessment Panel.
- Douglas Harold Cornwell, Member, Foundry Industry Training Committee, Amalgamated Engineering Union.
- Sarah Elizabeth Corry, Nursing Officer, Lagan Valley Hospital, Lisburn.
- Ronald Frank Crook, Chief Electrical Designer, Vosper Thornycroft Ltd.
- Elizabeth Cunliffe. For services to the Bradford Diocesan Family Welfare Committee.
- John Turner Cutter, Clerical Officer, Department of Health and Social Security.
- Phyllis Greenaway Dadd, Postal Supervisor, Appleby Frodingham Steel Co. Ltd., British Steel Corporation.
- Arthur Reginald Danks, TD, Chairman, Gloucestershire Old People's Welfare Committee.
- Jean Joanna Sybil MacDonald Dannatt, Warden, William Goodenough House, London, W.C.1.
- Thomas Edgar Davies, Teacher, Elleray Park School, Wallasey.
- William Henry Davies, Charge Nurse, Moorhaven Hospital, Ivybridge, Devon.
- Robert Davy, Senior Executive Officer, Royal Mint.
- Joan Allington, Lady de Bunsen, Librarian, The British Council.
- Edward Warren de la Mare, VRD, Superintendent, Imperial Lighthouse Service, Sri Lanka, Department of Trade.
- Arthur George Dennes, Assistant Group Manager, Housing Department, Greater London Council.
- Stanley Messenger Dodd, Industrial Relations Executive, Car Division, Rolls-Royce Motors Ltd.
- Harry Dodgson, Senior Executive Officer, Department of Employment.
- Lewis William Drake, lately Area Secretary, Devon and Cornwall National Federation of Building Trades Employers.
- Harriet Elizabeth Duncan, President, Aberdeen Branch, Royal British Legion.
- William Dunkley, Regional Collector, Board of Inland Revenue.
- William Francis Michael Dunne, Research Manager, Research Institute for Consumer Affairs.
- Florence Gertrude Mary Dyke. For services to the Smallpox Unit, Kent Area Health Authority.
- Henry Stanley Edwards, Chief Superintendent, North Wales Police.
- Nell Edwards. For services to disabled people in Cardiff.
- Everard Ellis. For services to the Billingham Physically Handicapped Club, Cleveland.
- Joan Doreen Elman (Mrs. Beck), Programme Liaison Officer, Thames Television Ltd.
- Evelyn Engelback, Clerical Officer, Ministry of Overseas Development.
- Alice Anne Ettridge, County Secretary, Norfolk, St. John Ambulance Brigade.
- Elizabeth Ray Evans, lately Secretary to the Controller, Wales, British Broadcasting Corporation.
- William Daniel Evans, Chairman, Carmarthen District Council.
- Geoffrey Exley, lately Headmaster, School for Visually Handicapped Children, Bridgend, Mid-Glamorgan.
- Margaret Ethel Farmer, Assistant Director, Greater Manchester Branch, British Red Cross Society.
- Elsie Maude Fisher, Secretary, Advisory Committee for the Education of Romany and other Travellers.
- Norman Henry Fitchett, Warden, Primary English Language Centre, Derby.
- Herbert John Fittin, Higher Executive Officer, Department of Health and Social Security.
- Victor Charles Flatt, Assistant Clerk, Lancashire County Council.
- Eric Victor Flowers, Divisional Safety Adviser, Bush Boake Allen Ltd.
- Brendan Foster. For services to Athletics.
- Harold Foster, Nursing Officer, Ellerslie House, Nottingham Area Health Authority.
- Norman Foster, Manager, Information, Patents and Technical Advisory Services Department, British Gypsum Ltd.
- Robert Franks, Deputy Director, Contracts, Marconi Communications Ltd.
- Charles Freebairn, Principal, Glasgow School of Chiropody.
- Harold Freeman, Production Superintendent, Wickman Wimet Ltd.
- George Burnett Galloway, Counsellor, Scottish Prison Service.
- John Richard Gammon, Senior Executive Officer, Lord Chancellor's Department.
- Edwin Gardner, lately Class A Clerk, Western Wessex Territorial Auxiliary and Volunteer Reserve Association.
- James Joseph Gardner, Chief Officer, Public Control Department, London Borough of Tower Hamlets.
- John Albert Garnham, Assistant Inspector of Fire Services, Fire Service Inspectorate.
- Philip Henry Garnham, Executive Officer, Department for National Savings.
- Rosalind Gatt, Principal Nursing Officer, Grampian Health Board.
- Norman Leonard Gay, Group Superintendent Radiographer, Bath Health District.
- Thomas Inglis Geddes, Secretary and Chief Administration Officer, Small Industries Council for Rural Areas of Scotland.
- Norman Gerrie, Special Projects Manager, Industries Branch, Scottish Prison Service.
- Henry Edmund Gibson, TD, Colliery Electrical Engineer, Wearmouth Colliery, North East Area, National Coal Board.
- Violet Hilda Giles. For services to the community in Tenbury Wells.
- Gillian Margaret Gilks. For services to Badminton.
- James Boyd Good, Inspector of Taxes (Higher Grade), Board of Inland Revenue.
- Stanley Robert Gothard, Senior Information Clerk, House of Commons.
- William Thomas Gough, Technical Quality Control Officer, Tracer Filling Department, Imperial Metal Industries (Kynoch) Ltd.
- Roy Trevor Graver, Regional Personnel Officer, Northern Regional Health Authority.
- John Greener, Manager, Traffic Services, Heathrow Airport, British Airports Authority.
- Kenneth Howard Leslie Gretton, General Secretary, Wolverhampton Federation of Tenants' Association.
- Raymond Lawrence Henry Gurney, Senior Executive Officer, Department for National Savings.
- Margaret Hagan, Domestic Superintendent, Wirral Area Health Authority.
- Grace Margaret Hallam, Hospital Visitor and Worker, Oxford, Women's Royal Voluntary Service.
- Margaret Mary Halley, Domestic Bursar, College of St. Matthias, Bristol.
- John William Hallows, Staff Writer, Kentish Express.
- John Reginald Hannan, Regional Manager (Scotland), General Council of British Shipping.
- Samuel Peter Hardy, Higher Executive Officer, Ministry of Defence.
- Arthur Harris, lately Headmaster, Wheatley Hill Secondary School, County Durham.
- Michael Guy William Albert Harris. For services to the National Association of Boys' Clubs and to Toc H.
- Victor Ambrose Harrison, Agent, Elveden Estate, Thetford, Norfolk.
- William Gardner Hawthorne, Area Manager, Community Industry, Glasgow.
- Kathleen Haywood, lately Organiser, Dallas Street Centre for the Physically Handicapped, Mansfield.
- Owen Hazel, Senior Executive Officer, Department of Health and Social Security.
- Norman Heaviside, Manager, Coke Works, Consett, General Steels Division, British Steel Corporation.
- Leonard Helliwell, Borough Librarian and Museums Curator, Southend-on-Sea Borough Council.
- Valerie Barbara Hemmens, Senior Personal Secretary, Department of the Environment.
- John Clifford Austin Hensley, lately Chief Superintendent, Metropolitan Police.
- Christopher Hesketh. For services to Rugby League Football.
- Mavis Millicent Hill, Barrister and Law Reporter.
- Eric Peter Hinkley, Group Engineer, County Engineer's Department, Warwickshire County Council.
- Stephen Maurice Hirst, General Service Manager, Technical, J. C. Bamford Excavators Ltd. For services to Export.
- Bernard Gilbert William Hodgkinson, District Highways Surveyor, Essex County Council.
- James Hodgkinson, Scientific Officer, Department of Employment.
- Frederick Walter Hodson, Deputy Works Manager and Superintendent, Pocketphone Department, Pye Telecommunications Ltd.
- Maurice Poole Holdsworth, Chairman, Chamber of Shipping. For services to Shipping.
- Frederick George Holmes, Venezuelan Contract Manager, Cammell Laird Shipbuilders.
- Doris Holt, Chairman, Bacup Savings Committee.
- Douglas Hopkinson, Headmaster, Ings Junior High School, Kingston, upon Hull.
- Kathleen Finlay Horsman, Senior Lecturer in Ceramics, Edinburgh College of Art.
- Barbara Howarth, Inspector of Taxes (Grade III), Board of Inland Revenue.
- Robert Howson, lately Professional and Technology Officer Grade I, Property Services Agency, Department of the Environment.
- Dorothy Alice Humphries, lately Teacher, Parkside Community College, Cambridge.
- Beatrice May Hunt, Clerk Typist, British Caledonian Airways Ltd.
- John Leslie Hunt, AE. For charitable services in Essex.
- Mary Jane Hunter, Vice-Principal, Olderfleet Primary School, Larne.
- Bartholomew Martin Hurley, Assistant Officer, Board of Customs and Excise.
- Eileen Campbell Hyndman. For services to women's hockey in Scotland.
- Raymond Ibbotson, Executive Officer, Lord Chancellor's Department.
- The Reverend Evan Lewis Isaac, lately Chief Field Organiser, Urdd Gobaith Cymru.
- John Currah Ivison, Vice-President, London Borough of Barnet Savings Committee.
- David Worling Jackson, Executive Director, Waste Disposal, Tyne and Wear County Council.
- Vera Jackson, Organiser, Kensington Citizens' Advice Bureau.
- William Stanley Billington Jackson, lately Head of Personnel, British Road Services Parcels Ltd.
- Harry Neil Jacobs, Bursar and Vice Principal, Royal Agricultural College, Cirencester.
- Marguerita Brenda Mary Jefferis, Organiser, East Sussex, Age Concern.
- Mary Elizabeth Jinks, lately Ward Sister, Leeds Road Hospital, Bradford.
- Cynthia Chloe Johnson, Senior Executive Officer, Department of Health and Social Security.
- Robert Shankland Johnstone, Manager, Carlisle Integrated Local Office, Department of Health and Social Security.
- Eric Bruss Jones, Director, Testing House and Laboratories, Manchester Chamber of Commerce.
- Samuel Mostyn Jones. For services to the community in Mid-Glamorgan.
- Thomas Arthur Jones, Nursing Officer, Garth Angharad Hospital, Dolgellau.
- Ernest Kenyon, lately Retired Officer II, Ministry of Defence.
- William Keown. For services to Cottage Industry in County Down.
- Ngaire Hamilton Kidston, Foreign and Commonwealth Office.
- Mary Kilcoyne, Clerical Officer, Central Office of Information.
- Gerald Hyam King, Head of Publications Department, National Council of Social Service.
- Russell James King, Chairman, Lincoln, South Lincolnshire, Newark and District War Pensions Committee.
- Ernest Christian Lanning, Overseas Secretary, The Agricultural Engineers Association Ltd. For services to Export.
- Hilda Laybourn, Chairman, Hull Street Groups Savings Committee.
- John Stanley Learoyd, Technical Officer, Furniture and Restoration, Council for Small Industries in Rural Areas.
- Kathleen Joan Le Clair, Diocesan Secretary, Diocese of Exeter.
- Harold Charles Leng, Senior Executive Officer, Paymaster General's Office.
- John Baxter Leslie, Export Sales Manager, Hugh Smith (Glasgow) Ltd. For services to Export.
- William John Lindsay, Irish Divisional Officer, National Union of Tailors and Garment Workers.
- Harold Frank Lovesey, Workshop Manager, Appleton Laboratory, Science Research Council.
- Eric Crichton Lowson, Managing Director, Holo-Krome Ltd., Dundee.
- George McAdam, Headmaster, Belah Primary School, Carlisle.
- John Joseph McArdle, TD, Deputy Headmaster, Kingussie High School.
- John Arthur Macaskie, lately Municipal Correspondent, Yorkshire Evening Post.
- William Eric McBurnie, Laundry Manager, South West District, Greater Glasgow Health Board.
- Jane Ann Macdonald, Senior Lecturer, Inverness Technical College.
- Helen McDougal, Assistant Secretary, Scottish Branch, Royal Air Force Benevolent Fund.
- Irene Macey, lately Organiser, Newcastle upon Tyne Citizens' Advice Bureau.
- Daphne Victoria Mackenzie. For services to the community in St. Boswells, Roxburghshire.
- Louis M'Keown. For services to the community of Connah's Quay, Clwyd.
- William James McKinney, Clerk to Magherafelt District Council, County Londonderry.
- Robert Main, General Secretary, Northumberland Area, National Union of Mineworkers.
- Winifred Marie Mainwaring, Supervisor, Records Department, The Pharmaceutical Society of Great Britain.
- Comins Mansfield. For services to Chess.
- Valerie Mary Ellen Marsh, lately Senior Personal Secretary, Department of Prices and Consumer Protection.
- Arthur Ray Thomas Mash, National Organising Secretary, Union of Post Office Workers.
- Clive Hartley Mather, Area Supervisor, GEC-Elliott Automation Ltd.
- Marjory Maw, lately Secretary, Women's Maintenance Council, Royal Infirmary of Edinburgh.
- Annie Huston Mawhinney. For services to the community in Newtownards and district.
- Geoffrey Francis Meades, Manager, Reinforced and Microwave Plastics Group, British Aircraft Corporation Ltd. For services to Export.
- John Cooper Mearns. For services to Scottish Folk Music.
- Charles Alfred George Meek, Higher Scientific Officer, Explosives Research and Development Establishment, Ministry of Defence.
- Dorothy Grace Merrill, Assistant Secretary, Churches Main Committee.
- Mary Messenger, Secretary, Northumbria Probation and After-Care Service.
- Harry John Milman, Retired Officer III, Ministry of Defence.
- Alexander Reuben Percy Moore. For services to the teaching of Ballroom Dancing.
- Wilfred Henry Moore, Senior Scientific Officer, Freshwater Biological Association.
- Edward Benjamin Morris, Project Manager, Drake & Scull Engineering Ltd.
- Theodora Morris, Deputy County Organiser, Cumbria, Women's Royal Voluntary Service.
- Dorothy Helen Mortby, lately Secretary, Coulsdon and Purley Branch, Croydon Guild of Social Service.
- Margaret Phyllis Morton, lately Secretary to Director of Research, Flour Milling and Baking Research Association.
- Constance Daphne Rita Mossman, lately Higher Executive Officer, Directorate of General Weapons (Naval), Ministry of Defence.
- Kathleen Mowat, Co-ordinator of services for the elderly, Clwyd, Women's Royal Voluntary Service.
- Mary Anne Muir, lately Matron, Dunforth Children's Homes, Edinburgh.
- Alan Patrick Mullery, Captain, Fulham Football Club.
- Daniel Murphy. For services to local government in the Rhondda.
- John Thomas Murray. For services to Cricket.
- Ernest Gordon Neal. For services to nature conservation in Somerset.
- Sidney Frank Neal, Deputy Secretary General, The Royal Air Forces Association.
- Frederick Thomas Nicholson, Member, National Educational Savings Committee.
- Richard George Norrell, Secretary, Hertfordshire Association of Clubs for the Blind.
- John Alan Platt Norris, Deputy County Commissioner, Greater Manchester East, Scout Association.
- Elsie Gertrude North. For services to the British Cardiac Society.
- Geoffrey North, Managing Director, Avon Rubber Co. (Bridgend) Ltd.
- William John Norton, Curator, Ludlow Museum.
- Hector Matthew Nunns. For services to the magistracy in Dewsbury and Batley.
- Stanley Nuttall, Principal Process Supervisor, Reactor Fuel Element Laboratory, Springfields, United Kingdom Atomic Energy Authority.
- Samuel Arthur Oake, Senior Executive Assistant, London Transport Executive.
- Walter John Oram. For services to education in South East London.
- Ethelberta Mary Osborn, lately Chairman, National Campaign for Nursery Education.
- Florence May Ovington, Divisional Nursing Officer, The Royal Victoria Infirmary, Newcastle upon Tyne.
- William Page. For services to the National Savings movement in Scotland.
- Edward Robert Park, Assistant Chief Fire Officer, Humberside Fire Brigade.
- Doris Parkinson. For services to Music in Merseyside.
- Wing Commander Douglas Alfred George Parry, DSO, DFC, Group Controller, Norwich Group, United Kingdom Warning and Monitoring Organisation.
- Florrie Passman. For services to the community in East London.
- Henry Allan Cecil Percy. For services to the Trades Union Movement.
- Audrey Perkins, Deputy County Organiser, Northamptonshire, Women's Royal Voluntary Service.
- Richard Alfred Perryman, lately Foreign and Commonwealth Office.
- Constance May Phelps, Clerical Officer, Ministry of Defence.
- Douglas Owen Phillips, Professional Technology Officer Grade I, Directorate of Aeronautical Quality Assurance, Ministry of Defence.
- Arthur John Phillipson, lately Director of Training, Guide Dogs for the Blind Association.
- John Herbert Phillpot, Secretary, Trustee Savings Banks Employers' Council.
- Stanley Frank Piercy, Manager, Foreign Touring Department, Royal Automobile Club.
- Phyllis Emily Pleece, Sister-in-Charge, Psychiatric Department and Day Centre, General Hospital, Jersey.
- John William Plowman, Member, Nottinghamshire County and Broxtowe District Councils.
- Reginald Thomas Polkey, Manager, Loughborough Local Office, Department of Health and Social Security.
- Catherine Stewart Pollock, lately Matron, Inch Hospital, Kelso.
- Edward Henry Post, Deputy Chief Constable, Surrey Constabulary.
- Molmore Pountney. For services to building research.
- John Kenneth Powell, Personnel Officer, British Petroleum Company Ltd.
- William Henry Procter, lately Chief Welfare Officer, Scottish Postal and Telecommunications Boards, Post Office.
- James Pullin, Gas Manager, Wales Region, British Gas Corporation.
- Arthur William Raines, Sector Administrator, Fulbourn and Ely Sector, Cambridge Area Health Authority.
- Ian James Rattray, General Dental Practitioner, Aberdeen.
- Donald Haldane Ray, Head, Department of Electrical Engineering and Applied Physics, Mid-Essex Technical College and School of Art.
- Alexander Cochrane Rea, Vice-President, Management Committee, City of Bath, Young Men's Christian Association.
- Cecil Read, Manager, Support Services, St. Thomas' Hospital, London.
- Peggy Elizabeth Reynolds, Sister-in-Charge, Out-Patients Department, King Edward VII Hospital, Windsor.
- Harold George Rhodes, Councillor, Newcastle-under-Lyme District Council.
- Ethel Richards, Secretary/Deputy Director of South West Arts Association.
- Ernest James Richardson, Editor, Tyrone Courier.
- Leslie Frank Ridgewell, Higher Executive Officer, Cabinet Office.
- Edward Ernest Rivers, Secretary, Joint Working Party of the Licensed Victuallers Central Protection Society and the National Federation of Licensed Victuallers.
- Roy John Edwin Roberts, Senior Executive Officer, Forestry Commission.
- Catherine Anne Robertson, lately Principal Nursing Officer, Redbridge and Waltham Forest Area Health Authority.
- Kathleen Elizabeth Roots, Supervisor, Typing Services, National Research Development Corporation.
- Charles Frederick Rose, Professional Technology Officer Grade II, HM Naval Base, Portsmouth, Ministry of Defence.
- Ernest Henry Ross, Secretary, Portsmouth Committee, Royal Naval Benevolent Trust.
- Peter Fleming Ross, Chief Superintendent, Strathclyde Police.
- Rebecca Eve Ross, Personnel/Production Progress Officer, H. Edgard & Sons (London) Ltd.
- Edwin Routledge. For services to the community in Wigton, Cumbria.
- Courtney Rowe, Project Manager, British Aircraft Corporation Ltd. For services to Export.
- David Thomas Rowlands, County Secretary, Caernarvonshire Branch, National Farmers' Union.
- Joseph Henry Ambrose Ruzicka, Senior Scientific Officer, Laboratory of the Government Chemist.
- Thomas Gregory Ryder, Councillor, Shrewsbury District Council.
- Dennis Albert George Sargent, DFC, County Rent Officer, Essex County Council.
- Moira Frances Seale, lately Area Manager, Belfast No. 1 Area, Northern Ireland Housing Executive.
- Mona Rosaline Selway, Senior Executive Officer, Board of Customs and Excise.
- George Harold Sharpe. For services to the community, especially disabled people in Loughborough.
- Captain Arthur Shaw, Chaplain's Assistant, Church Army, HM Prison Pentonville.
- James Sinclair Shaw, Chairman, Fleetwood Disablement Advisory Committee.
- Harold John Sheppard, Assistant Records Officer, Commonwealth War Graves Commission.
- Norman Ernest Shervell, Higher Executive Officer, Office of Population Censuses and Surveys.
- William Edward Shield, Senior Executive Officer, Department of Employment.
- John Harris Shields, Secretary and Treasurer, Livingston Community Association.
- Henry Townsend Shirley, TD, Secretary for Scotland, The Boys' Brigade.
- Marjorie Simmons, lately Divisional Secretary, Penge and Anerley, Soldiers', Sailors' and Airmen's Families Association.
- Thomas John Sims, Higher Executive Officer, Welsh Office.
- Kathleen Elizabeth Skene. For services to the Cancer Research Campaign in Windermere.
- Ethel Smith, Executive Officer, Department of Health and Social Security.
- John Lightfoot Spencer-Smith, Head, Basic Research Division, Lambeg Industrial Research Association.
- Phyllis Diana Smith, Foreign and Commonwealth Office.
- Richard Terence Smith, Senior Cattle Manager, Lord Rayleigh's Farms Inc. and Strutt & Parker (Farms) Ltd.
- Thomas Stanley Smith, Principal Nursing Officer, Broadmoor Special Hospital, Department of Health and Social Security.
- Marjorie May Marguerite Snape, Ward Sister, Highcroft Hospital, Birmingham Area Health Authority.
- Samuel Massiah Springer, Member, North Metropolitan Conciliation Committee, Race Relations Board.
- Irene Tamara Stiubei, Foreign and Commonwealth Office.
- Norman Kelvin Stoller, Group Managing Director, Seton Group of Companies.
- Peter Robert Dennis Styles, Technical Director, Medelec Ltd.
- Harry Sugarman, Cutting Room Manager, Daks-Simpson Ltd.
- Anne Sullivan (Sister Mary Cyril), lately Headmistress, St. Mary's & St. Michael's Roman Catholic Junior School, London E.1.
- Alan Christopher Taylor, Bloodstock Manager, Tattersalls.
- Ronald George Thomas, lately Photographer, South Wales Evening Post.
- William Alexander Thompson, Chief Relay Engineer, G.E.C. Measurements Ltd.
- John Frederick Tulloch Thomson, Manager of Cultural Activities, Kilmarnock and Loudoun District Council.
- Andrew Thorne, Valuer (Main Grade), Board of Inland Revenue.
- Geoffrey John Younghusband Thorpe, VRD, District Inspector of Fisheries, Ministry of Agriculture, Fisheries and Food.
- Joan Catherine Tipping, Deputy Principal, Department of Health and Social Services, Northern Ireland.
- Reginald Alexander Todd, Property Maintenance Officer, Telford Development Corporation.
- Jenny Tomlinson, Secretary, Building Materials Export Group. For services to Export.
- Clarence Aubrey Toogood, Borough Engineer and Director of Basic Services, London Borough of Greenwich.
- Esme Theodora Toye, Assistant Editor, Cotton Growing Review, Cotton Research Corporation.
- John Edward Traxson, Senior Community Relations Officer, Birmingham Community Relations Committee.
- Elizabeth Downs Turnbull, Secretary, Falkirk and Grangemouth District, Women's Royal Voluntary Service.
- Ernest Leslie Vernon, Senior. Executive Officer, Department of Employment.
- Andrew Walker, Professional and. Technology Officer Grade I, Property Services Agency, Department of the Environment.
- Jane Bernadette Wall, Secretary, North Western Area Office, Sea Cadet Corps.
- John Norman Wall, Architect, Greater London Council.
- Douglas Edmund Warland, lately Head, Department of Construction, Coventry Technical College.
- Jean Waterston, Head Occupational Therapist, Simon Square Centre, Edinburgh.
- Jack Dixon Watford, General Secretary, The Crusaders' Union.
- Mary Diana Gordon Watson. For services to Riding.
- Patrick Brian Watson, Assistant Chief Civil Engineer, Northern Ireland Railways Co. Ltd.
- Ronald Arthur Watson, Headmaster, High Birch Special School, Rochdale.
- Cyril Staple Watts, AE, Toastmaster.
- Denis Claude Vernon Watts, Principal National Athletics Coach.
- Wilfred Leslie Watts, Clerical Officer, Department of Health and Social Security.
- Denys William Way, Marine Personnel Manager, Palm Line Ltd.
- Margaret Mary Webb. For services to the Retirement Lease Housing Association.
- George Albert Weeden, lately Chief Operating Manager, Regional Headquarters, Waterloo, British Railways Board.
- Commander John Leslie West, DSC, Royal Navy (Retd.), Retired Officer I, Directorate of Naval Warfare, Ministry of Defence.
- Edward Alfred White, Clerical Officer, Church Commissioners for England.
- Thomas White, Chairman, East Lothian District Council.
- Neville Herbert Whittaker, Manager, Animal Hospice, Heathrow Airport, Royal Society for the Prevention of Cruelty to Animals.
- Kathleen Audrey Whittam, Regional Nurse, South West Thames Regional Health Authority.
- Olive Rose Whittemore, Organist, HM Prison Winchester.
- Sidney Wilkinson, Clerical Assistant, Walsall, Midlands Electricity Board.
- William Wilkinson, Senior Information Officer, RNB Portsmouth, Ministry of Defence.
- Ernest Sydney Wilks, Docks Manager, Goole, British Transport Docks Board.
- Ronald Horace Willshire, Senior Executive Officer, Department of Employment.
- Sheila Rankin Wilson, Superintendent, Refreshment Department, House of Lords.
- Norah Peggy Wood, Shorthand Typist Grade I, Board of Inland Revenue.
- Edward Woods, Chief Superintendent, Royal Ulster Constabulary.
- Clifford Woodward, lately Principal Architect, Scottish Special Housing Association.
- Samuel Frank Edward Wyatt, lately Clerical Officer, Metropolitan Police Office.
- Thomas William Yellowley, Member, Newcastle upon Tyne City Council.

Diplomatic Service and Overseas List

- Kathleen Violet Akester, lately Radio Facilities Manager, United Nations Information Department, New York.
- Joan Marjorie Antcliff. For services to education in Mozambique.
- Wendy Dorothy Barnes. For services to broadcasting in Hong Kong.
- Cecil Eric Brown. For services to the British community in Tanzania.
- George Edwin Bryant, lately Head of Registry, British High Commission, Lagos.
- Annie Campbell. For services to education in St. Vincent.
- Edgar Walter Carter. For services to British commercial interests in Belgium.
- Lillian Maud Clarke. For welfare services to the community in Uganda.
- James John Cochrane. For services to the community in Gibraltar.
- Eric Arthur Crew, Vice-Consul, British Consulate-General, New York.
- Kathleen Joan Darling. For services to education in Chile and to Anglo-Chilean relations.
- Delroy Anthony Dewdney, Honorary British Pro-Consul, BarranquHla, Colombia.
- The Reverend Atherton William Simon Didier. For services to the community in Dominica.
- Eileen Joan Dredge. For services to the British community in the Bahamas.
- Michael Eugene Louis Dufaye. For services to British commercial interests in France.
- William Glendinning Elliot, Inspector of Works, Ministry of Works, Lesotho.
- Donald Wilfred Evans. For services to the community in Bermuda.
- Francis Ferdinand, Permanent Secretary, Ministry of Finance, St. Lucia.
- Kathleen Margaret Fonseca. For services to the British community in Portugal.
- John Foster. For services to the British community in Argentina.
- Jean Marion Stanford Fox, Vice-Consul, Her Majesty's Embassy, Santiago.
- Philippe Marie Louis Gelle. For services to British official interests in Madagascar.
- Irene Florence Gook-Gunnlaugsson, lately Honorary British Vice-Consul, Akureyri, Iceland.
- James Henry Hawke, TD. For welfare services to British seamen in Hamburg.
- The Reverend John Holden. For services to the British community in Uganda.
- Lucy Holmes. For welfare services to children in Jamaica.
- Delphie Louise Hubber. For services to the British community in Uruguay.
- John Irwin. For services to British commercial interests and the community in Kenya.
- John Matthew Jared, Commercial Officer, Her Majesty's Embassy, Buenos Aires.
- Eric Hudson Jones, lately Technical Assistance Adviser to the Governments of the West Indies Associated States.
- Ena Phyllis Judkins. For welfare services to the community in Antigua.
- Ivor Wilfred Kemp, British Council Librarian, Rome.
- Mildred Thelma King. For services to the community in St. Lucia.
- Vernon Frank King. For services to commerce and the community in the Gambia.
- Vernon Thomas King, Head Government Printer, Falkland Islands.
- Thomas Raphael Lake. For welfare services to the community in Anguilla.
- Thomas Lawrence Lamb. For services to British commercial interests in Japan.
- Kenneth Sydney Lambert, British Council Regional Representative, Sabah, Malaysia.
- Ann Patricia Leasure, Assistant Administration Officer, British Consulate-General, Chicago.
- John Ernest De Lengerke. For services to the British community in Switzerland.
- Lenora Lewthwaite, lately Senior Airport Reception and Information Officer, Hong Kong.
- Sin Siang Li, lately Consular Clerk, Her Majesty's Embassy, Jakarta.
- Lilian Rachel Lichtenberger. For services to British official interests in Uruguay.
- John Llewellyn, Assistant Registrar, University of Hong Kong.
- Lo Hin-shing. For public services in Hong Kong.
- Robert Rustat McConnel. For services to the development of fisheries in Kenya.
- Gertrude Mary McDonald. For services to teacher training in Sabah, Malaysia.
- Eric Sydney Mason, Chief Field Officer, Ministry of Agriculture, Solomon Islands.
- Daisy May Matthews. For nursing services to the community in Antigua.
- Ian Mossman Mathieson. For services to British commercial interests in Mexico.
- Margaret Ursula Mee. For services to botany in Brazil.
- Charles Albert Metcalf, Vice-Consul, British Consulate-General, Naples.
- Albert Spencer Mills. For services to the British community in southern Italy.
- William Frederick George Moon, lately Grade 8 Officer, Her Majesty's Embassy, Saigon.
- Priscella Morson. For welfare services to children in Montserrat.
- Charles Noble. For services to the British community in Vienna.
- Roy Austin Ottman, Acting Director of Posts and Telegraphs, The Gambia.
- Stanley Robert Parsons, lately Transport Supervisor, Her Majesty's Embassy, Rome.
- Arthur Alfred Payne, Senior Finance Officer, Accountant General's Department, Malawi.
- Alan Aubrey Pellett, Vice-Consul, British Consulate-General, Durban.
- June Rosamund Ramsay, Personal Assistant to Her Majesty's Ambassador, Brussels.
- Irene Alice Hope Roberts, JP. For public and community services in the Turks and Caicos Islands.
- Howard Rostrevor Dion Rochester. For services to Anglo-Colombian relations.
- Philip Terence John Rouse, lately Vice-Consul, Her Majesty's Embassy, Saigon.
- Mary Spilsbury. For services to Anglo-Swedish relations.
- Frederick Gilbert Streets, Industrial Relations Officer, Gibraltar.
- George Barclay Thomson, lately First Secretary (Administration), British Council, New Delhi.
- Eugenie Etheline Todman-Smith, Permanent Secretary, Ministry of Natural Resources and Public Health, British Virgin Islands.
- John William Tucker, Principal, Outward Bound School, Hong Kong.
- Raymond Joseph Usher, lately Honorary British Vice-Consul, Bananera, Guatemala.
- Edgar Vaea. For services to education and the community in the Solomon Islands.
- The Reverend Charles Edward Verlingue. For services to the community and to Anglo-French relations in the New Hebrides Condominium.
- William Percival Charles Wallen. For services to sport and athletics in Belize.
- Margaret Isobel Jessie Wallis. For services to British commercial interests in the United States.
- Hew-ki Watt, CPM, lately Senior Divisional Officer, Auxiliary Fire Service, Hong Kong.
- Jack White, Head of Trade Promotion Registry, Her Majesty's Embassy, Washington.
- Keith Reed Whitnall, lately Second Secretary (Technical Assistance), British High Commission, Kingston.
- Leslie Rosemary Forrester Wronka, Visa Section Clerk, Her Majesty's Embassy, Warsaw.

Australian States

State of New South Wales

- Donald McManus Angel. For services to journalism.
- Norman Hector Bent. For services to ex-servicemen.
- Rupert Northcote Boulton. For services to aviation.
- Kenneth Leigh Breakspear. For services to sport.
- Donald Cameron. For services to local government.
- Bernard Doman. For services to education.
- Colin Hector Dunlop. For services to the law.
- James Hamilton Morgan Evans. For services to the community.
- John Kenneth Fell. For services to sport.
- Margaret Gillespie. For services to the arts.
- Walter Ernest Hasemer. For services to the community.
- Helen Heather Kirby. For services to the State.
- Reginald Edward Millen McLaughlin. For services to sport.
- Pixie O'Harris (Mrs. Bruce Pratt). For services to the arts.
- Frank Robert Salway. For services to the community.
- William Simpson. For services to the community.
- Alderman Ronald Henry Springett. For services to local government.
- Pauline Stuart (Dr. P. Baillie-Newton). For services to medicine.
- Monica Annie White (Sister Mary Majella). For services to medicine.

State of Victoria

- George Noel Bisset, of Timboon. For services to the community.
- Vincent John Bourke, of East Malvern. For services to the Victorian Public Service.
- Burtta Cheney, of Toorak. For services to women's golf.
- Flora Frances Courtney, of Healesville. For services to the community.
- Jean Alice Cowan, of Balwyn. For services to women's sport, particularly netball.
- Joyce Isobel Davis, of Chelsea. For services to the community and women's athletics.
- Mary Gwendoline Lyall Davis, of Burwood. For services to epileptics and their families.
- Harold Hanning, of Morwell. For services to hospitals and health services.
- Helen Katharine Irving, of Coldstream. For services to pony clubs.
- Councillor Thomas Peake, of Chiltern. For municipal and community services.
- Alfred Race, of Balwyn. For services to mentally disabled people.
- Councillor Edward George Smith, of Spotswood. For services to the Naval Association of Australia.
- Herbert Hector Smith, of Brimpaen. For municipal and community services.
- Beryl Trigellis-Smith, of Hawthorn. For services to the community.
- Raymond John Ware, of North Balwyn. For services to the community, especially to Lions International.
- Cora Doreen Gilsenan-Waters, of Metung. For services to Aborigines and the community.

State of Queensland

- Robert Leslie Baker, of Gayndah. For services to the citrus industry and community.
- Harold Naunton Davies, of Annerley. For services in the field of civil engineering.
- Essie Lillian Goodchild, of Murgon. For services to the Girl Guides Association and community.
- James Davidson Grimes, of Nambour. For his services to the community, particularly the aged.
- Annie Winifred Warrella Hossack, of Wilston. For her services as an officer of the Queensland Public Service.
- Edmond James Joseph McKenna, of Bowen. For services to teaching and to charity.
- Gertrude Everil Moore, of Yeppoon. For her services in the fields of nursing and welfare work in Central Queensland.
- The Reverend Heinrich Wilhelm Ludwig Prenzler, of Northgate. For services to the Lutheran Church and the sick.
- Councillor William Gordon Reid, of Longreach. For services to primary industry and to racing.
- Mac Ormiston Scott, of Rockhampton. For services to commerce, charity and sport.
- Geoffrey Scrope Shrapnel, of Nambour. For services to the ginger industry and to charity.
- Councillor Ernest Gaden Western Wood, of Wellington Point. For services to local government and the community.

State of Western Australia

- John Chappell, JP. For services to ex-servicemen.
- Maud Claressa Foxton, JP. For services to the community.
- Lillian Patricia Kavanagh. For services in the educational field.
- Mabel Gladys Lavinia Rowe. For services to war veterans and their dependants.
- Horace Carson Stewart. For services to the community as a chartered accountant.

=== Order of the Companions of Honour (CH) ===
- The Right Honourable John Diefenbaker, QC, MP, Prime Minister of Canada, 1957–63.

=== Companion of the Imperial Service Order (ISO) ===
Home Civil Service

- Ronald James Abraham, Senior Supply and Transport Officer, HM Naval Base, Malta, Ministry of Defence.
- Mark Ainsworth, Principal Scientific Officer, Chemical Defence Establishment, Ministry of Defence.
- Lionel James Alexander, Principal, Department of Industry.
- Howard Frederick Thorne Allaway, Senior Principal, Ministry of Defence.
- Bernard Alexander Brown, Principal, Office of HM Procurator General and Treasury Solicitor.
- Sydney Harold Carter, Deputy Superintending Inspector, Department of Employment.
- Stanley Crook, Foreign and Commonwealth Office.
- Thomas Drummond, Principal, Scottish Education Department.
- William James Forster, Senior Principal, Department of the Environment for Northern Ireland.
- Robert Herbert Gowen, Principal, HM Stationery Office.
- Ronald Stephen Hayward, BEM, Principal, Board of Inland Revenue.
- Kenneth Dean Law, Principal, Ministry of Overseas Development.
- Mary Eleanor Millson, Senior Principal, Home Office.
- Thomas Roberts, Principal, Welsh Office.
- Arthur Cyril Robson, MM, lately Principal, Ministry of Agriculture, Fisheries and Food.
- Ronald Shutt, Principal, Department of Industry.
- Gilbert Harry Sprackling, MBE, lately Chief Safety Officer, Property Services Agency, Department of the Environment.
- Philip Henry John Tempero, lately Senior Principal Scientific Officer, Directorate of Electronics Radar (Airborne), Ministry of Defence.
- George Morgan Treharne, Senior Inspector of Taxes, Board of Inland Revenue.
- Thomas Arthur Tuck, Official Receiver, Norwich/Ipswich Department of Trade.
- Cecil Walsingham, Principal, Civil Service Department.
- Harold Victor White, Principal, Department of Health and Social Security.
- Aldwyn Powell Williams, Principal, Department of Health and Social Security.
- Doris Lilian Wiseman, Principal, Property Services Agency, Department of the Environment.
- Robert Edward Victor Wright, Principal, Northern Ireland Office.

Diplomatic Service And Overseas List

- Iskandar Agafuroff, Treasury Accountant, Hong Kong.
- Siema Grunberg, Chief Engineer, Railway Department, Hong Kong.

Australian States

State of New South Wales

- Leslie Kenneth Downs, Under-Secretary and Permanent Head, Department of the Attorney-General and of Justice.
- Phillip Stanley Hill, Chairman of the Metropolitan Meat Industry Board and of the New South Wales Meat Industry Authority.

State of Victoria

- Michael Walsh, First Referee of the Small Claims Tribunal.

State of Queensland

- Archibald Elwyn Guymer, Permanent Head of the Department of Education.

=== British Empire Medal (BEM) ===
Military Division

Royal Navy

- Chief Radio Electrical Mechanician Robert William Benham, D054052R.
- Chief Petty Officer Coxswain (SM) John Patrick Cadogan, J6S7022Q.
- Chief Petty Officer Cook Maurice Cross, M9S2848G.
- Chief Petty Officer William James Davies, Royal Naval Reserve, K996301.
- Chief Wren (DG) Violet Bramald Dyson, Women's Royal Naval Reserve, N/W201.
- Communications Yeoman David William Field, J972470C.
- Aircraft Mechanician (AE)1 Gordon William French, F837319D.
- Ordnance Electrical Mechanician (O)1 Douglas Grandison, M934250F.
- Sergeant Ian George Hemshall, Royal Marines, P021049R.
- Chief Petty Officer Writer Brian Thomas Herniman, M894094F.
- Colour Sergeant Gilbert Rex Howe, DCM, MM, Royal Marines, T004522T.
- Chief Petty Officer Coxswain James Irvine, J817046B.
- Chief Marine Engineering Artificer (P) Robert Jones, M943543T.
- Assistant Head Naval Nurse Beryl Lorna Lloyd-Williams, Y000059D.
- Chief Petty Officer Writer Robert Macaulay, M954509M.
- Chief Petty Officer Writer James Alexander Mackay, M942642B.
- Radio Electrical Mechanician (A)1 Nigel Robert Martin, F964740H.
- Chief Petty Officer Stores Accountant Trevor Mayman, M788027T.
- Chief Marine Engineering Artificer (P) Stewart Hayden Munn, Royal Naval Reserve, M049773E.
- Chief Petty Officer (OPS)(S) Robert John Nicholls, J944392D.
- Colour Sergeant Keith Nixon, Royal Marines, P013399C.
- Chief Petty Officer Medical Assistant Thomson Noble, M9844Sov.
- Chief Petty Officer (PT) Michael Robert Peacock, J944082F.
- Band Colour Sergeant Sydney Ernest Richardson, Royal Marines, Q002422S.
- Colour Sergeant Frederick William Ryan, Royal Marines, P012593W.
- Petty Officer (SSM) Anthony Lee Sadler, J908843V.
- Chief Marine Engineering Artificer (H) Charles Harold Aynsley Sinclair, M857773K.
- Chief Petty Officer (CA) Victor Henry Street, J522923R.
- Chief Medical Technician (R) Kenneth William Whitfield, M8330S5J.

Army

- 237844S4 Staff Sergeant Gordon Peter Banks, Corps of Royal Electrical and Mechanical Engineers.
- 2663272 Corporal (Acting Lance Sergeant) William Ernest Bewshear, Coldstream Guards.
- 23463009 Staff Sergeant Alexander Shand Williamson Brannan, Army Catering Corps.
- 22624548 Corporal Stuart John Browning, The Queen's Regiment, Territorial and Army Volunteer Reserve.
- W/62967 Private (Acting Sergeant) Lilian Marjorie Burbidge, Women's Royal Army Corps.
- 23251137 Sergeant (Now Staff Sergeant) David Kenneth Burden, Corps of Royal Electrical and Mechanical Engineers.
- 23664130 Staff Sergeant Keith Edward Carroll, Corps of Royal Electrical and Mechanical Engineers.
- 23500469 Staff Sergeant Michael Biyon Church, Army Catering Corps.
- 22114679 Corporal (Acting Sergeant) Sidney Davies, Corps of Royal Engineers.
- 24102996 Sergeant Christopher John Edwards, Royal Regiment of Artillery.
- 14454852 Staff Sergeant (Local Warrant Officer Class 2) Douglas Thomas Ellis, The Queen's Regiment.
- 22510361 Staff Sergeant William Henry Fargin, The Parachute Regiment, Territorial and Army Volunteer Reserve.
- 23487798 Sergeant Raymond Donald Jackson Fiddy, The Queen's Regiment.
- 23119836 Staff Sergeant John Mitchell Christie Fowler, Army Catering Corps.
- 23215136 Staff Corporal (Now Acting Warrant Officer Class 2) Clifford James Hales, The Life Guards.
- GR/3548 Sergeant Alfred Holmes, The Gibraltar Regiment.
- 22548370 Corporal (Acting Sergeant) Albert James Hooker, The Parachute Regiment.
- 24078220 Sergeant John Robert Hunt, The Royal Regiment of Fusiliers.
- 23517058 Lance Sergeant John Inyram Mire Innes, Scots Guards (Now Discharged).
- 22291978 Staff Sergeant Charles Edwin Job, Corps of Royal Engineers, Territorial and Army Volunteer Reserve.
- W/391005 Private (Acting Sergeant) Elizabeth Joseph, Women's Royal Army Corps, Territorial and Army Volunteer Reserve.
- W/114486 Private (Acting Sergeant) Margaret Vida Knotman, Women's Royal Army Corps (Now Discharged).
- 23250335 Corporal William Keenan Malone, The King's Own Scottish Borderers.
- 23498658 Sergeant Michael Collins McCarthy, The Royal Irish Rangers (27th (Inniskilling) 83rd and 87th).
- 23860760 Sergeant Albert Edward Miller, Corps of Royal Engineers.
- 22137384 Staff Sergeant David Mitchell, Royal Army Medical Corps, Territorial and Army Volunteer Reserve.
- 23984002 Sergeant (Acting Staff Sergeant) John Mitchell, The Devonshire and Dorset Regiment.
- 22810332 Sergeant Alexander Irvine Murray, Royal Regiment of Artillery.
- 23927521 Staff Sergeant (Acting Warrant Officer Class 2) Lewis John Robert Nicholas, Royal Corps of Signals.
- 24003580 Sergeant Seamus O'Connor, The Duke of Wellington's Regiment (West Riding).
- 23822870 Sergeant Trevor Overton, Royal Regiment of Artillery.
- 23834333 Staff Sergeant Michael James Christopher Payne, Corps of Royal Engineers.
- 22955094 Sergeant (Now Acting Staff Sergeant) Alfred Derek Peachey, Grenadier Guards.
- 23063384 Staff Sergeant (Local Warrant Officer Class 2) Walter Poxon, Special Air Service Regiment.
- 23527560 Staff Sergeant William Alexander Watt Sloan, Corps of Royal Electrical and Mechanical Engineers.
- 24120437 Corporal Keith Steeper, Corps of Royal Engineers.
- 23826062 Staff Sergeant Rodney Dennis Summerfield, Royal Corps of Transport.
- 23956025 Sergeant William David Berry Tatnall, Royal Corps of Signals.
- 23922832 Staff Sergeant David Taylor, Royal Army Ordnance Corps.
- 23932411 Sergeant James Taylor, Royal Army Ordnance Corps.
- 23833549 Staff Sergeant John Arthur Toplis, The Duke of Wellington's Regiment (West Riding).
- 22213910 Staff Sergeant Reynold Harry TRU3Sler, Grenadier Guards.
- 23231905 Sergeant (Acting Staff Sergeant) Raymond Eric Truswell, Corps of Royal Electrical and Mechanical Engineers.
- W/411556 Sergeant (Now Staff Sergeant) Marie Therese Ghislaine Von-Dahlen, Women's Royal Army Corps.
- 22217300 Staff Sergeant Dennis Thomas Williams, Welsh Guards.

Royal Air Force

- W3S25338 Flight Sergeant Patrick Joseph Vincent Allsop, RAF Regiment.
- E5016664 Flight Sergeant James Keith Davies.
- P4033672 Flight Sergeant John Gay.
- T4186680 Flight Sergeant Graham Ernest Hartley.
- R4019462 Flight Sergeant Wilfred Jones.
- P4129364 Flight Sergeant Daniel Howard Longstaff.
- Y1922157 Flight Sergeant Richard Brian Madge.
- Y0682014 Flight Sergeant (now Master Air Electronics Operator) Edward Henry Arthur Norman.
- A4030252 Flight Sergeant Raymond Anthony Joseph Quinn.
- K1922397 Acting Flight Sergeant Lawrence James Braithwaite.
- H1935980 Acting Flight Sergeant Haslope John Oldham.
- B1924089 Chief Technician Michael Charles Adams.
- S1930710 Chief Technician Christopher Michael Parkes.
- M0588820 Chief Technician Raymond Denis Pearson.
- R0586472 Chief Technician Malcolm Carsley Sweeney.
- J4138979 Sergeant Harry Dennis Aldwinckle.
- Q4026658 Sergeant Thomas Norman Fletcher.
- Q4131418 Sergeant Bernard Kennard.
- T4194371 Sergeant James Alexander Kerr.
- J4173795 Sergeant Richard George Page, RAF Regiment.
- A1314832 Sergeant Francis Leslie Price.
- B4132287 Sergeant John Wardley.
- Q4191961 Sergeant David Yates.
- Q4252670 Corporal Roy Eggett.
- J1929507 Corporal Brian James Jones.
- R3525431 Corporal George Samuel Looney.
- T3512402 Corporal Terence James Parr.
- F4280269 Corporal Harold Douglas Rice.
- T4172483 Corporal William Powley Sanderson.

Civil Division
United Kingdom

- Charles Stephen Abbott, Plant Attendant, Wareham Module, Wessex Water Authority.
- Matthew Lorraine Adamson, Janitor, Newcastleton Primary School, Newcastleton, Roxburghshire.
- John Aitchison, lately Chargehand Monitor, Chapelcross Works, British Nuclear Fuels Ltd.
- Alan William Allcock, Chargehand Unit Operator, Castle Donington Power Station, Midlands Region, Central Electricity Generating Board.
- Albert Stanley Alston, Instructional Officer Grade III, Her Majesty's Prison Chelmsford.
- Dennis Amos, Chargehand Fitter, Repair Division, Messrs. C. Hill & Sons Ltd., Bristol.
- Charles Morris Anderson, Head Gardener, Dundee District Hospitals.
- Thomas Anderson, Assistant Chief Flying Instructor, No. 645 (Middlesbrough) Gliding School, Air Training Corps.
- Sidney John Andrews, lately Photoprinter Grade 1, Property Services Agency, Department of the Environment.
- Cyril Theodore Grenville Barnes, Forester and Estate Carpenter, Dovenby Estates, Cumbria. For services to forestry.
- Hazel Bates, Member, Parents' Committee, Burnley Sea Cadet Corps.
- Sydney Samuel Bayman, Electrician, Royal Ordnance Factory, Radway Green, Ministry of Defence.
- Edward Bebbington, lately Length Foreman, Weaver Navigation, British Waterways Board.
- Olive Mary Berridge, District Organiser, Maldon, Essex, Women's Royal Voluntary Service.
- Frederick Michael Berthele, Ganger, Chillingham Forest, Forestry Commission.
- James Bertram, Mobile Librarian, East Lothian District Council.
- Brian Walter John Billingsley, Foreman, Crown House Engineering Ltd.
- William Harry Bland, lately Senior Chauffeur, Confederation of British Industry.
- William Henry Charles Bleach, Senior Technician, South Eastern Telecommunications Region, Brighton Telephone Area, Post Office.
- Leslie Bleasdale, Sergeant Major Instructor, Merseyside, Army Cadet Force.
- Joyce Mary Booker, Sergeant, West Midlands Police.
- Joseph Bowers, Toolroom Chargehand, George Clark & NEM Ltd., Hartlepool.
- John Charles Bradshaw, Plant Controller, Preston Concentration Depot, National Fuel Distributors Ltd.
- Frank Brennan, Blacksmith and Press Operator, Glasgow Branch, Redpath Dorman Long Ltd., British Steel Corporation.
- Charles George Britten, Senior Construction Foreman, Northants County Council.
- Laurence Albert Brook, Chargehand Craftsman, Royal Mint.
- Henry John Brown, Bookbinder, Tropical Products Institute, Ministry of Overseas Development.
- Margaret Brown, Ulster Savings Street Group Collector, Belfast.
- Kenneth Peter Eric Bryant, Surveyor Grade 3, Ordnance Survey.
- Louise Emma Burgess. For services to the community, particularly to physically disabled people, in Suffolk.
- Patrick Joseph Burke. For services to the community in Co. Antrim.
- Albert Conrad Callister, Painter, Vickers Ltd., Shipbuilding Group, Barrow-in-Furness.
- Glenorchy George Campbell, Driver, Scottish Omnibuses Ltd.
- George Leslie Carter, Sub-Postmaster, Benenden Chest Hospital, South Eastern Postal Region, Post Office.
- Victor Champion, Commissionaire, Television Centre, British Broadcasting Corporation.
- Marjorie Edith Chapman, Divisional Superintendent (County Pool), Northamptonshire, St. John Ambulance Brigade.
- Edward Arthur Leslie Clark, Repository Assistant Supervisor, Department of Trade.
- James Percy Cobb, Craft Apprentice Supervisor, John Laing Construction Ltd.
- Winifred Violette Colwell, National Savings Group Collector, Lewes, Sussex.
- Alice Elizabeth Coombes, Cashier, Whitehall Luncheon Club.
- Douglas Bert Coombes, Mess Superintendent, Royal Military Academy, Ministry of Defence.
- Catherine Jane Cooper, Forewomen Cleaner, Metropolitan Police Office.
- John Israel Cooper, Master, Port Auxiliary Service, Clyde, Ministry of Defence.
- Thomas Herbert Cooper, National Savings Group Collector, Great Yarmouth.
- William Jeremiah Corcoran, Chief Store Keeper, Ministry of Defence.
- Derek Cornforth, Signalman Class "D", Darlington, Eastern Region, British Railways Board.
- William Charles Crawt, Tool Room Supervisor, Graseby Instruments Ltd., Surbiton, Surrey.
- Reginald Ernest Davidson, Professional and Technology Officer Grade IV, Ministry of Defence.
- Kathleen Davies, Club Supervisor, Navy, Army and Air Force Institutes, Harewood Club, Catterick, Yorkshire.
- James Mark Davis, Commissionaire/Liftman, Thames House Estate Ltd.
- Tom Davison, Medical Board Assistant, Yorks and Humberside, Department of Health and Social Security.
- Marjorie Rose Denyer, Member, Parents' Committee, Dagenham and Romford Sea Cadet Corps.
- Maurice Dermody, Workshop Foreman, Royal Greenwich Observatory.
- Wallace William Doick, Professional and Technology Officer Grade III, Property Services Agency, Department of the Environment.
- James Donaldson, Principal Officer (Instructor), Polmont Borstal Institution.
- Peter John Donohoe, Driver, Ministry of Defence.
- Andrew Michael Doody, Sergeant, Ministry of Defence Police.
- Matthew Shortt Draffan, Miller, Derby Engine Division, Rolls-Royce (1971) Ltd.
- Harry Driscoll, Conductor, London Transport Executive.
- Jessie Jan Easton Drummond, National Savings (Street Group) Collector, Blackridge, West Lothian.
- Nancy Margaret Duffin, Canteen Supervisor, Thorpe Marsh Power Station, North Eastern Region, Central Electricity Generating Board.
- Peter Deuchars Duncan, Commandant, Arbroath British Rail Section, St. Andrew's Ambulance Corps.
- David John Edmonds, Constable, Royal Ulster Constabulary.
- John Michael Edwards. For services to the community in Tonyrefail, Mid-Glamorgan.
- Percy Lloyd George Ehrat, Electrical Fitter, London Electricity Board.
- Richard Easton Elder, Chief Officer Class II, HM Prison Belfast, Northern Ireland.
- Frederick Walter Ellingham, lately Stores Officer III, Rothamsted Experimental Station, Harpenden, Hertfordshire.
- Archibald Joseph Ellis, Senior Messenger, Ministry of Defence.
- John Ellis, Professional and Technology Officer III, Royal Ordnance Factory, Patricroft, Ministry of Defence.
- Ivy May Evans, Cleaner, Bristol City Council.
- James Henry Evans, Chief Steward, Britannia Royal Naval College, Dartmouth, Ministry of Defence.
- Thomas John Evans, Sergeant, Royal Ulster Constabulary.
- William Evans, Driver/Caretaker, British Council, Edinburgh.
- William Fisher, Fitter's Mate, Erewash Foundry, Stanton, Tubes Division, British Steel Corporation.
- John Harold Forster, Foreign and Commonwealth Office.
- Doris Fowler, Joint Local Organiser, Crewe, Women's Royal Voluntary Service.
- Alfred Franklyn, Messenger, Ministry of Defence.
- Emma Louisa Fritchley, lately Joint Local Organiser, Fareham, Hampshire, Women's Royal Voluntary Service.
- Percy Fulton, Constable, Ministry of Defence Police.
- Henry Oscar Funge, Chief Storekeeper, Institute of Oceanographic Sciences.
- Margaret Elizabeth Fyffe, Ulster Savings Group Collector, Omagh.
- Eleanor Siddell Gale, National Savings Group Collector, Consett, Co. Durham.
- Cyril Frederick Gibson, Works Chauffeur, Whiteley Electrical Radio Co. Ltd., Mansfield.
- Hector Sebastian Gilbert, Lord Mayor's Attendant, City of Manchester.
- Jean Sinclair Isobel Glen, Telephone Operator, Naval Ship Production Overseer, Scotland and Northern Ireland, Ministry of Defence.
- Alfred Ernest Thomas Goodman, Electrical Fitter's Mate, South Kent District, South Eastern Electricity Board.
- Elizabeth Alexander Grafton, Member, Old People's Welfare Committee, Prestwick, Women's Royal Voluntary Service.
- Alec Leonard Gray, Assistant Supervisor, South Herts Area, Eastern Region, British Gas Corporation.
- Dorothy May Green, Senior Fire Control Operator, Essex Fire Brigade.
- Florentina Lilian Green, Cleaner Supervisor, Department of Industry.
- James Edward Green, lately Workshop Superintendent, Pre-Production Assembly, Smith Industries Ltd.
- May Greek, Sub-Postmistress, Bentpath, Dumfriesshire, Post Office.
- Robert Bruce Grice, Photographer, Headquarters, United Kingdom Land Forces, Ministry of Defence.
- Leonard Groves, Messenger, Department of Trade.
- Elsie Harland, Leading Fire Control Operator, West Yorkshire Fire Brigade.
- William Alfred Harrison, Skilled Welder, Begg, Cousland & Co. Ltd., Glasgow.
- Alfred Hart, Foreign and Commonwealth Office.
- Ronald George Hawkins, Sergeant, Metropolitan Police.
- Madeline Hazell. For services to the community, particularly to disabled people in South Gloucestershire and Avon.
- Alan Elijah Hearnah, Senior Usher, Preston Crown Court.
- Laura Isabella Hett, County Children's Welfare Organiser, East Sussex, Women's Royal Voluntary Service.
- Thomas Henry Reginald Heywood, Driver, Commonwealth War Graves Commission.
- William George Hill, lately Supervisor, Administrative Services, Atomic Energy Research Establishment, Harwell.
- Joyce Patricia Hinchliffe, Section Leader, Property Services Agency, Department of the Environment.
- Joseph Thomas Hinkley, Chargehand Craftsman, Royal Mint.
- William Burgess Hodkinson, Deputy Shift Leader-Ambulanceman, Eastern Area Health and Social Services Board, Belfast.
- Albert Arthur Hook, Supports Economy Officer, Dinnington Colliery, South Yorkshire Area, National Coal Board.
- Leslie Robert Hopper, Chargehand Blacksmith, Southern Region, British Gas Corporation.
- Robert Hoy, Ramp Operator, Larne Harbour, Co. Antrim.
- Walter Fredrick Charles Hulks, For services to the National Association of Boys' Clubs in Kent.
- Eric Roy Arthur Humphries, Constable, Northamptonshire Police.
- Rose Louvain Hutson (Mrs. Rose Heasman), Chief Office Keeper, Home Office.
- Leonard Jackson, Constable, North Yorkshire Police.
- Robert Jeffreys, Supervisor, Messrs. J. Charlton, Drainage Contractor, Hexham.
- Roy Leslie George Jennings, Instrument Maker, S. G. Brown Ltd., Watford.
- Emily Isabel Jervis, National Savings Group Collector, Liverpool.
- Edgar Wallace Johns, Surgeryman, Royal Aircraft Establishment, Farnborough, Ministry of Defence.
- Julie Marion Rose Jones, Observer, No. 1 Group (Maidstone), Royal Observer Corps.
- Ronald Ramsay Kay, Warrant Officer, No. 2365 (Brechin) Squadron, Air Training Corps.
- Michael Keane, Senior Messenger, Law Officer's Department.
- John Keown. For services to arboriculture in Co. Down.
- Audrey Killen, National Savings Group Collector, Bradford.
- Arthur James Knight, Coach, Belgrave Amateur Boxing Club, Leicester.
- William John Langley, Storeman, Barry Factory, BP Chemicals International Ltd.
- Sidney David Lawrence, Sheet Metal Worker, Ford Motor Company.
- Arthur Leonard, Setter, Military Aircraft Division, British Aircraft Corporation, Warton.
- Roy Letsome, Works Supervisor, Heathrow Airport, British Airports Authority.
- Edwin Lilly, Chief Machinist, Royal Opera House, Covent Garden. (Died 2 December 1975.)
- John George William Lockyer, Instructional Officer Grade III, Ministry of Defence.
- John Greig McBain, Donkeyman/Greaser, SS Benreoch, Wm. Thomson & Co. Ltd., (Ben Line).
- Albert Edmund McClure, Engineer, College of Technology, Belfast.
- Isaac McClure, Inspector, Northern Ireland Railways.
- Charles Richard McElligott, Postal Executive C (Inspector), Leatherhead, London Postal Region, Post Office.
- Frances Evelyn McKinnon, Chief Woman Observer, No. 28 Group (Dundee), Royal Observer Corps.
- Robert McKinnon, lately Boat Superintendent, Clyde Pilotage Authority.
- Leonard William McLean, Chauffeur, ICI Ltd., Huddersfield.
- George MacPherson, Ambulance Driver, Kingussie, Inverness-shire.
- Donald McCaskill McSween, Chief Cook, Ocean Weather Ships Service, Ministry of Defence.
- Georgina Magee, National Savings (Street Group) Collector, St. Andrews, Fife.
- Robert Edward Marvell, Fitter, Fiat-Allis U.K. Ltd. For services to Export.
- Dorothy Beatrice Mayo, Clearier, Cannock Chase District Council.
- Louis Mazzina, Member, Norbrook Boys' Club, Ardwick Lads' and Youth Centre, Manchester.
- John Leonard Mileham, Sergeant, Metropolitan Police.
- Felicity Minter, District Organiser, Colchester, Essex, Women's Royal Voluntary Service.
- James Joseph Mitchell, Senior Office Keeper, Department of Health and Social Services, Northern Ireland.
- John Thomas Moore, Water Fitter, Welsh National Water Development Authority.
- Margaret Moore, Chief Supervisor (F), Belfast Telephone Area, Northern Ireland Postal and Telecommunications Board.
- John Morgan, Working Supervisor, W. & J. Knox Ltd. Kilbirnie, Ayrshire. For services to Export.
- Hugh Augustine Moriarty, Member, Gogarburn Hospital Voluntary Association, Edinburgh.
- Mary Barlow Morris, Photoprinter Grade I, Ministry of Defence.
- Albert Edward Nicholls. For services to the community, particularly to charity in Wrexham, Clwyd.
- Kenneth Jack Nixon, lately Clerk of Works, St. Catharine's College, Cambridge.
- Ronald Joshua Nobles, Head Attendant, Wallace Collection.
- John Orr, Technician, Wick, Scottish Region, British Railways Board.
- David John Passfield, Wireless Technician, Home Office.
- Albert Edward Passmore, Senior Messenger, Civil Service Department.
- Edwin Christopher Pearce, Supervisor of Works, West Yorkshire County Council.
- Robert Henry Alexander Pickersgill, Office Keeper, Privy Council Office.
- George Henry Piper, Commandant, Berkshire/15 Detachment, Berkshire Branch, British Red Cross Society.
- William John Thomas Poole, Professional and Technology Officer Grade IV, Ministry of Defence.
- Clara Powell, Office Keeper Grade I, Department of Industry.
- John Hector Power, Sub-Officer, Hereford and Worcester Fire Brigade.
- Cora Anne Pring, Chargehand, Remploy Ltd., Redruth, Cornwall.
- Ethel Prior. For services to Kelling Children's Hospital, Holt, Norfolk.
- Russell Proud, Fabrication and Machine Shop Foreman, Wolsingham Steel Co. Ltd., Co. Durham.
- Reginald Pulleyn, Relief Signalman, York, Eastern Region, British Railways Board.
- Amos Lloyd Ramsden, Guard, Grantham, Eastern Region, British Railways Board.
- Harriett Greaves Quance, Donor Assistant, Sheffield Blood Transfusion Service.
- William James Smithers, Bookseller, HM Stationery Office.
- Albert Stanfield, Foreman, Aluminium Corporation Ltd., Dolgarrog.
- Frederick Lewis Stansbury, Carpenter, London Borough of Southwark.
- James Stephenson, Power Loader, Langley Park Colliery, North East Area, National Coal Board.
- Robert William Donald Stevens, Driver/Assistant, Library and Museum Service, Wiltshire County Council.
- Phillip Stokes, National Savings Group Collector, Tetbury, Gloucestershire.
- Ellen Alice Stone, Matron, Ladbroke Day Nursery, Royal Borough of Kensington.
- Albert Sidney Taylor, Technical Officer, London Telecommunications Region, Centre Area, Post Office.
- George Alfred Taylor, lately Steward, Sun Alliance & London Insurance Group.
- Herbert Taylor, Chargehand Rigger, British Broadcasting Corporation.
- Roger Edward Hammond Taylor, Machine Man, Aylesford Paper Mills, Aylesford, Kent.
- Thomas William Victor Tester, Constable, Royal Ulster Constabulary.
- Amelia Edith Thomas, Senior Messenger, Board of Customs and Excise.
- Clifford David Thomas, Chief Paper Keeper, Department of Education and Science.
- Mary Elizabeth Rattley. For services to the community in Leicestershire.
- Gilbert Rees, Head Porter, Singleton Hospital, Swansea.
- Frederick George Roberts, Area Traffic Inspector, London Transport Executive.
- Manson Ross, District Linesman and Jointer, North of Scotland Hydro-Electric Board.
- Reginald David Rowlands, Deputy Supervisor, Ministry of Agriculture, Fisheries and Food.
- Charles Savage, Assistant Twist-Hand, F. W. Barnes & Sons Ltd., Nottingham.
- Eveline Savage, Assistant Commissioner, South Glamorgan County, St. John Ambulance Brigade.
- George Edward Sceats, Revenue Assistant, Board of Customs and Excise.
- Stanley James Self, Assistant Foreman, Central Works, Western Welsh Omnibus Company Ltd.
- William Sheader, Coxswain, Scarborough Life-Boat, Royal National Lifeboat Institution.
- Walter Sheldon, Works Supervisor, Derbyshire County Council.
- Ronald Harold William Shepherd, Leading Plant and Vehicle Fitter, Edward Thompson Ltd., Derby.
- Albert William George Simmons, Distribution Foreman, Watford District, Eastern Gas Region, British Gas Corporation.
- John Alexander Simpson, Steward I, RAF Kinloss, Ministry of Defence.
- Leonard Thurman Simpson, Overman, Snibston Colliery, South Midlands Area, National Coal Board.
- Edward George Skillicorn, Verger, St. George's Church, Douglas, Isle of Man.
- Henry Young Slater, Foreman Fitter, Armament Division, Engineering Group, Vickers Ltd., Elswick Works.
- Benjamin Herbert Smith, Skilled Shopman, National Carriers Ltd.
- John Andrew Thompson, Professional and Technology Officer Grade IV, Ministry of Defence.
- Harry Thornton, Senior Leading Hand, Melting Shop, Bilston Works Special Steels Division, British Steel Corporation.
- Frederick Tindall, Office Keeper Grade I, Department of Employment.
- Edna Lillian Todd, Member, Regional Staff, East Midland Region, Women's Royal Voluntary Service.
- Arthur William Tootill, Porter Messenger, Department of Energy.
- Paul Gary Tubman, Mud Engineer, BP Petroleum Development Ltd.
- Leslie James Tungate, Farm Foreman, Messrs. Charles Wharton & Partners, Great Yarmouth, Norfolk. For services to Agriculture.
- Martin Wager, Doorkeeper, House of Lords.
- Kenneth John Walker, Caretaker, Parkfield Upper School and St. Theresa's Roman Catholic Primary School, Wolverhampton.
- William Henry Ward, Driver, Liverpool Area, North Western Region, British Gas Corporation.
- Thomas George Warrender, Senior Messenger, Edinburgh Sheriff Court.
- William Wasson, Instructor, Government Industrial Rehabilitation Unit, Department of Manpower Services, Northern Ireland.
- George Edward Watkiss, Constable, West Midlands Police.
- Haydn Hartwell Webb, Constable, Metropolitan Police.
- George Vivian Weeks, Professional and Technical Officer Grade III, Property Services Agency, Department of the Environment.
- Charles Thomas White, Driver I, Government Car Service, Property Services Agency, Department of the Environment.
- Thomas Benjamin White, Assistant Works Superintendent, Eastern National Omnibus Company Ltd.
- Albert Thomas Leonard Wilder, Driver, Metropolitan Police Office.
- Phyllis May Wilkes, Commandant, Merseyside Branch, British Red Cross Society.
- Ellen Mary Williams, Joint Local Organiser, Pontardawe, West Glamorgan, Women's Royal Voluntary Service.
- John Hugh Williams, Warden, Cemaes and Cemlyn, Anglesey, The National Trust.
- George Wood, Maintenance Fitter, Clarence Works, British Steel Corporation (Chemicals) Ltd.
- Walter Frederick Worledge, Gardener Caretaker 1st Class, Commonwealth War Graves Commission.
- Thomas Stanley Wright, Deputy Commandant, Leicestershire Special Constabulary.
- David Wyche, Laboratory Steward, Ministry of Agriculture, Fisheries and Food.

Overseas Territories

- Au Yeung Chau, Office Attendant, Public Works Department, Hong Kong.
- Chan Hung, Overseer, Urban Services Department, Hong Kong.
- Chan Ping-ki, Senior Coxswain, Marine Department, Hong Kong.
- Chan Yiu, Labourer, Hong Kong.
- Cheung Chung-pak, Clerical Officer, Auxiliary Police Headquarters, Hong Kong.
- Rajab Abdul Cureem, Senior Clerical Officer, Police Headquarters, Hong Kong.
- Kong Chi-hung, Clerical Officer, Fire Services Department, Hong Kong.
- Lau Fat, Messenger, Urban Services Department, Hong Kong.
- Leung Bun-Loong, Overseer, Urban Services Department, Hong Kong.
- Li Yiu-hung, Clerical Officer, Home Affairs Department, Hong Kong.
- John Bitiai Pita, Prison Officer, British Solomon Islands Protectorate.
- Tse Tung-tang, Messenger, Labour Department, Hong Kong.
- Josephine Olga Viale, Telephone Operator, Telephone Department, Gibraltar.
- Yeung Kam-piu, Police Interpreter Class I, Hong Kong.

Australian States

State of New South Wales

- Irene Acland. For services to medicine.
- Kenneth Tosach Arrowsmith. For services to local government.
- Iris Eileen Attewell. For services to the community.
- David Ian Bosworth. For services to the community.
- Edward Treton Finlayson Brown. For services to sport.
- William Frederick Charles Brown. For services to the State.
- Jack Burch. For services to the community.
- John Charles Windermere Capp. For services to primary industry.
- Elizabeth Marion Carter. For services to the community.
- Beatrice Frances Fairfax. For services to the community.
- Wilfred Eustace Gibson. For services to primary industry.
- Harriett Mary Harris. For services to the community.
- Eric David Henderson. For services to the community.
- Walter George Hill. For services to ex-servicemen.
- Lena Roberta Howard. For services to the community.
- Elvira Kathleen Howson. For services to ex-servicemen.
- Beatrice Sarah Langley. For services to the community.
- Frances Mae McLeod. For services to medicine.
- Leo Charles Meaney. For services to ex-servicemen.
- Charles Albert Miller. For services to the State.
- Frederick James Milthorpe. For services to the community.
- Maria Mounter. For services to the community.
- William Clifton Oliver. For services to the community.
- Alice Ethelwyn Read. For services to the community.
- David Hamilton Scotland. For services to the community.
- Thomas Edward Pascoe Smith. For services to the State.
- Amelia Elizabeth Steenholdt. For services to the community.
- Annie Gladys Sutcliffe. For services to sport.
- Edna Ethel Walmsley. For services to the community.
- Edith Vera Wilson. For services to the community.

State of Victoria

- Rosemary Ethelwynne Boyes, of Mount Eliza. For services to Australian history.
- Stanley Eric Cummings, of Nhill. For services to the community.
- Hilda Beveridge Dawes, of Pascoe. For services to the community.
- Robert Graham Farrow, of Newtown. For services to the community.
- William Cecil Foulkes, of Ballarat. For services to the community.
- Eric Fox, of Mount Eliza. For services to music and the community.
- Stanley Nicholas Warburton Grose, of East Malvern. For services to ex-servicemen.
- Ella Mary Hemkes, of Healesville. For services to the community.
- Allen George James, of Oakleigh. For services to the community.
- Tasman Ian Johnson, of North Essendon. For services to cycling.
- Edith Lain, of Brighton. For services to the community.
- Dorothy Lancet, of Middle Brighton. For services to the community.
- Sylvia Maie Letcher, of Toorak. For services to the Royal Melbourne Hospital.
- Arthur Weston Hinvest Levins, of Seville. For services to the community.
- Audrey Florence Margaret Moorhead, of Elsternwick. For services to kindergartens in the community.
- Harold Henry Nathan, of East Bentleigh. For services to scouting and to disabled children.
- William Charles Osborne, of East Malvern. For services to the aged, infirm and mentally ill.
- Geoffrey Simon Patience, of Glenhuntly. For services to the community.
- Mollie Alice Rothacker, of Eaglehawk. For services to the community.
- Amuri Russell, of Banvon Heads. For services to the community.
- Marguerite Dorothy Shaw, of Goornong. For services to the community.
- Alfred George Sisson, of St. Kilda. For services to the council and people of St. Kilda.
- Thomas Cobham Watson, of Caulfield. For services to the community.
- Hilda Whitehead, of Camperdown. For services to the community.
- Alwyn Melville Wilkinson, of Ballarat. For services to band music.

State of Queensland

- Alexander Vincent Connors, of Granville. For services to brass bands.
- Kathleen Hildred Dickson, of Toowoomba. For services to education and child art.
- Jessie May Hooper, of Caloundra. For services to the community.
- Isabel Mary Jamieson, of Gympie. For services to the community.
- Joan Kopelke, of New Farm. For services to the community.
- Charlotte Mildred Lenton, of Winton. For services to the community and the Methodist Church.
- June Elizabeth McIntyre, of Kenmore. For services to disabled people.
- Stanley Cecil Lewis McIntyre, of Kenmore. For services to disabled people.
- Doreen Elizabeth Oxlade, of New Farm. For services to the community and child welfare.

State of Western Australia

- Agnes Hamilton-Brown (Mother Marie Consolata). For services to the community in Kalgoorlie.
- Doris Clapp. For services to the community in Tambellup.
- Gertrude St. Clare Davies. For services to the community in Bunbury.
- Vera Simms Harvey. For services to the community in Bunbury.
- Ida Gertrude Lloyd. For services to the community and the Guides movement.
- Elza Maude Miners. For services to ex-prisoners of war and their relatives.

=== Royal Red Cross (RRC) ===
- Ruth Stone, ARRC, Matron, Queen Alexandra's Royal Naval Nursing Service.
- Colonel Kathleen Grimshaw (342217), Queen Alexandra's Royal Army Nursing Corps.
- Colonel Doreen Fay Liddington (420424), Queen Alexandra's Royal Army Nursing Corps.
- Lieutenant-Colonel Jean Gertrude Munro, TD, (437238), Queen Alexandra's Royal Army Nursing Corps, Territorial and Army Volunteer Reserve.
- Group Officer Joan Metcalfe, ARRC, Princess Mary's Royal Air Force Nursing Service.

==== Associate of the Royal Red Cross (ARRC) ====
- Yvette Blanche McKinnel, Superintending Sister, Queen Alexandra's Royal Naval Nursing Service.
- Jean Ward, Superintending Sister, Queen Alexandra's Royal Naval Nursing Service.

=== Air Force Cross (AFC) ===
Royal Air Force

- Wing Commander William Bruce Gardner Hopkins (3512494).
- Wing Commander Michael George Simmons (607734).
- Squadron Leader Henry Jordan Crone (608128).
- Squadron Leader Keith William Mills (2619553).
- Squadron Leader John Edward Rooum (4230944).
- Squadron Leader William Somers (153764).
- Squadron Leader John Watson (4230631).
- Flight Lieutenant George Michael Cullen (4044627).
- Flight Lieutenant John Hall Fawcett, (2618718).

=== Air Force Medal (AFM) ===
Royal Navy

- Petty Officer Aircrewman Victor Stewart Carcass, F977324T.
- Chief Petty Officer Aircrewman John Hiram Guppy, F886780L.

Royal Air Force

- M4007569 Flight Sergeant Andrew Sweeney.

=== Queen's Police Medal (QPM) ===
England And Wales

- Barry Newton Pain, Chief Constable, Kent Constabulary.
- Austin Haywood, MBE, Deputy Chief Constable, West Yorkshire Police.
- Kenneth George Lee, Deputy Chief Constable, South Wales Constabulary.
- Harry Allen Bailey, Assistant Chief Constable, Staffordshire Police.
- William Donaldson, Assistant Chief Constable, West Midlands Police.
- Ronald Smith Lancaster, Assistant Chief Constable, Merseyside Police.
- James Arthur Henry Pill, Assistant Chief Constable, Devon and Cornwall Constabulary.
- Leonard Ernest Read, Assistant Chief Constable, Nottinghamshire Constabulary — seconded as National Co-ordinator for Regional Crime Squads.
- Henry Smith Ross, Assistant Chief Constable, Thames Valley Police.
- Ronald Leonard James Ashby, Commander, Metropolitan Police.
- Patrick Joseph Flynn, Commander, Metropolitan Police.
- David Helm, Commander, Metropolitan Police.
- Charles Gerard Horan, Chief Superintendent, Greater Manchester Police.
- Harry Malcolm Shelley, Chief Superintendent, Derbyshire Constabulary.
- John Eugene Swain, Superintendent, Metropolitan Police.

Scotland

- John Nicol, MBE, Assistant Chief Constable, Grampian Police.
- Hugh Mackenzie, Detective Chief Superintendent, Strathclyde Police.

Northern Ireland

- Errol Thomas Joseph McDowell, Sergeant, Royal Ulster Constabulary.

Overseas Territories

- Patrick Joseph Clancy, CPM, Chief Superintendent, Royal Hong Kong Police Force.
- Derek Overington, Chief Superintendent, Nigeria Police Force.
- Howard John Rumbelow, CPM, Chief Superintendent, Royal Kong Kong Police Force.

Australian States

State of New South Wales

- Francis Charlton, Sergeant, 1st Class, New South Wales Police Force.
- William George Clyne, Superintendent, 2nd Class, New South Wales Police Force.
- Francis Michael Farrell, Inspector, 1st Class, New South Wales Police Force.
- Charles Edward Fenley, Superintendent, 3rd Class, New South Wales Police Force.
- Frederick Francis Longbottom, Superintendent, 1st Class, New South Wales Police Force.
- Mervyn Thomas Taylor, Sergeant, 2nd Class, New South Wales Police Force.
- Sydney Claude Workman, Superintendent, 3rd Class, New South Wales Police Force.

State of Victoria

- Wesley Batman Carter, Chief Superintendent, Victoria Police Force.
- Phillip Eric Chandler, Chief Inspector, Victoria Police Force.
- William Joseph McBride, Chief Superintendent, Victoria Police Force.
- Thomas Matthew Owens, Chief Superintendent, Victoria Police Force.
- Roy Kyte-Powell, Brevet Inspector, Victoria Police Force.
- Martin Hubert Vereker, Chief Superintendent, Victoria Police Force.

State of Queensland

- Edward Sidney Byles, Superintendent, Queensland Police Force.
- Spencer Moray Hale, Superintendent, Queensland Police Force.
- Vernon Alister MAcDonald, Superintendent, Queensland Police Force.
- Steadman Percy Charles Phillips, Superintendent, Queensland Police Force.

State of Western Australia

- Reginald Carr, Assistant Commissioner, Western Australian Police Force.

State of Tasmania

- Frederick George James Shepherd, Deputy Commissioner, Tasmania Police Force.
- Joseph Henry Sherriff, Superintendent, Tasmania Police Force.
- Joseph Harford Smith, Superintendent, Tasmania Police Force.

=== Queen's Fire Services Medal (QFSM) ===
England and Wales

- James William Henry Arnold, Assistant Chief Fire Officer, West Midlands Fire Brigade.
- Richard John Morse, Chief Fire Officer, South Glamorgan Fire Brigade.
- Harry Bardsley, Assistant Chief Fire Officer, Lancashire Fire Brigade.
- Frederick John Western, Chief Fire Officer, Norfolk Fire Brigade.

=== Colonial Police Medal (CPM) ===
- Biu Chan, Ambulanceman, Hong Kong Fire Services.
- Phee-chuan Cheah, Chief Inspector of Police, Royal Hong Kong Police Force.
- Kalola Dionisio Poleita Fabiano, Assistant Superintendent of Police, Solomon Islands Police Force.
- Malcolm George Farnham, Superintendent of Police, Royal Hong Kong Police Force.
- Gladwyn Clinton Hall, Inspector of Police, Bermuda Police Force.
- Douglas Noel Hebberd, Inspector of Police, Bermuda Police Force.
- Kwai-chin Ho, Principal Fireman, Hong Kong Fire Services.
- Chun-ching Hsiah, Chief Inspector of Police, Royal Hong Kong Police Force.
- Kam-hung Kwan, Principal Fireman, Hong Kong Fire Services.
- Wah-piu Kwong, Principal Fireman, Hong Kong Fire Services.
- Tai-chang Jo, Divisional Officer, Hong Kong Fire Services.
- Lok-bun Lam, Divisional Officer, Hong Kong Fire Services.
- Ying-fat Lee, Principal Fireman, Hong Kong Fire Services.
- Tak-Kwong Leung, Senior Inspector of Police (Auxiliary), Royal Hong Kong Auxiliary Police Force.
- Yuen Leung, Principal Fireman, Hong Kong Fire Services.
- Keith Harry Lomas, Superintendent of Police, Royal Hong Kong Police Force.
- John Howard March, Divisional Officer, Hong Kong Fire Services.
- Ronald Lorraine Redpath, Superintendent of Police, Royal Hong Kong Police Force.
- Ghulam Sabir, Sergeant, Royal Hong Kong Police Force.
- William Alexander Samuels, Assistant Superintendent of Police, British Virgin Islands Police Force.
- Yuk-fan Tam, Assistant Divisional Officer, Hong Kong Fire Services.
- Benjamin Taylor, Inspector of Police, Royal Turks and Caicos Islands Police Force.
- Peter Tsao Kwang-yung, Superintendent of Police (Auxiliary), Royal Hong Kong Auxiliary Police Force.
- Chester H Wong, Superintendent of Police (Auxiliary), Royal Hong Kong Auxiliary Police Force.
- Yiu-ming Wong, Station Sergeant (Auxiliary), Royal Hong Kong Auxiliary Police Force.
- Kin-chung Yau, Station Sergeant, Royal Hong Kong Police Force.
- Kam-sing Yeung, Principal Fireman, Hong Kong Fire Services.
- Kar-kee Yu, Principal Fireman, Hong Kong Fire Services.

=== Queen's Commendation for Valuable Service in the Air ===
Royal Air Force

- Wing Commander Terence John Nash (4230199).
- Squadron Leader Robert Bruce Blagbrough (608376).
- Squadron Leader Kenneth George Gowers (4112519).
- Squadron Leader John Victor Holf (53683), Royal Air Force (Retired).
- Squadron Leader Peter George Johnson (4231861).
- Squadron Leader George Lee (4220082).
- Squadron Leader David John Rowe (585327).
- Squadron Leader Brian Edom Russell (3520101).
- Squadron Leader Michael Roger Smith (607947).
- Squadron Leader John Howard Wolley (3507434).
- Squadron Leader Edward George Wood (4220063).
- Flight Lieutenant Michael Anthony Fox (4232583).
- Flight Lieutenant Vincent Rolph Holmes (584576).
- Flight Lieutenant Cyril Henry Maynard (1893924).
- Flight Lieutenant Derek Ernest North (608546).
- Flight Lieutenant Dennis Arthur Stangroom (684559).
- Master Engineer Leon Winston Slee (M0586765).

United Kingdom

- Alan John Bond, Chief Steward, European Division, British Airways.
- Harold Rodney Lea, Senior Captain 1st Class, European Division, British Airways.
- Eric Leonard Ronald Poole, Assistant Chief Pilot (Technical), European Division, British Airways.
- John Dudley Ryder, Chief Training Captain, Boeing 707 Fleet, British Caledonian Airways Ltd.
- Josie Bruck-Shaw, Stewardess, Overseas Division, British Airways.
- Peter Roderick Woodford, Senior Steward, Overseas Division, British Airways.

== Mauritius ==
=== Knight Bachelor ===
- Radhamohun Gujadhur, CMG, Deputy Speaker, Legislative Assembly.
- Claude Noel, CMG. For services to the planting community and restructuring food and agricultural production.

=== Order of Saint Michael and Saint George ===
==== Companion of the Order of St Michael and St George (CMG) ====
- Mohamad Amade Hajee Dawdjee Mamode Vayid. For public service.

=== Order of the British Empire ===
==== Commander of the Order of the British Empire (CBE) ====
Civil Division

- Jean Philippe Labauve D'Arifat. For services to the planting community.
- Marie Anthony Frederic Robert. For services to the sugar industry and economic diversification.

==== Officer of the Order of the British Empire (OBE) ====
Civil Division

- Jean Alfred Roger Julienne. For voluntary social work.
- Tipnarainsingh Ramdaursingh. For services in the Central Statistical Office.

==== Member of the Order of the British Empire (MBE) ====
Civil Division

- Satterdeo Dabee, lately Principal Nursing Officer.
- Sim Chow Wong Ting Fook. For services to animal welfare.
- Joseph Emmanuel Serge Lebrasse. For services to local folklore.
- Sarosatee Punchun. For voluntary social work.
- Hurrychurn Ramrekha. For services to the co-operative movement.

== Fiji ==
=== Order of the British Empire ===
==== Commander of the Order of the British Empire (CBE) ====
Civil Division

- Ronald Graham Quayle Kermode. For services to parliament and the community.

==== Officer of the Order of the British Empire (OBE) ====
Civil Division

- Kenneth Ross Bain, formerly Deputy High Commissioner for Fiji in London.
- Grace Deoki, President of the National Women's Council.

==== Member of the Order of the British Empire (MBE) ====
Military Division

- Major Tiu Wesele Malo, ED, Fiji Infantry Regiment.

Civil Division

- Asad Ali Asgar. For services to the community.
- Aisea Erasito, Chief Medical Officer.
- Wate Basaga Tagilala, Controller of Hurricane Relief Supplies.
- Ratu Inoke Takiveikata, JP, Provincial Administrator.

=== Companion of the Imperial Service Order (ISO) ===
- Netani Tokalauvere Druavesi, lately Secondary School Teacher.

=== British Empire Medal (BEM) ===
Military Division

- Corporal Jone Waqavolau, Fiji Infantry Regiment.

Civil Division

- Jack Elbert Dunne. For services as a splint maker.

=== Queen's Police Medal (QPM) ===
- John William Kelland, Commissioner, Royal Fiji Police.

== Bahamas ==
=== Order of the British Empire ===
==== Commander of the Order of the British Empire (CBE) ====
Civil Division

- Edgar Roderick Bain. For services to the community.

=== British Empire Medal (BEM) ===
Civil Division

- Ernest Clarke. For services to the community.

=== Queen's Police Medal (QPM) ===
- Gerald Augustus Bartlett, CPM, Deputy Commissioner, Royal Bahamas Police Force.
- Dudley Terrance Hanna, Assistant Commissioner, Royal Bahamas Police Force.
- Stanley Riddle Moir, CPM, Assistant Commissioner, Royal Bahamas Police Force.
- John Alfred Sherman, CPM, Deputy Superintendent, Royal Bahamas Police Force.

== Grenada ==
=== Order of Saint Michael and Saint George ===
==== Companion of the Order of St Michael and St George (CMG) ====
- Oswald Moxley Gibbs, High Commissioner for Grenada in London.

=== Order of the British Empire ===
==== Officer of the Order of the British Empire (OBE) ====
Civil Division

- Gloria Marlene Payne, Permanent Secretary, Planning and Development Division, Prime Ministers Office.

==== Member of the Order of the British Empire (MBE) ====
Civil Division

- Louis Michael Masanto, Chief Longshoreman.

=== Companion of the Imperial Service Order (ISO) ===
- Andrew Desmond Mitchell, Comptroller of Customs and Excise.

=== British Empire Medal (BEM) ===
Civil Division

- Theodore Macauley Bedeau. For services to sport.
- Maude Louise DeCoteau. For services to education.
