= Robert Alexander Neil =

Scottish classicist (1852–1901)

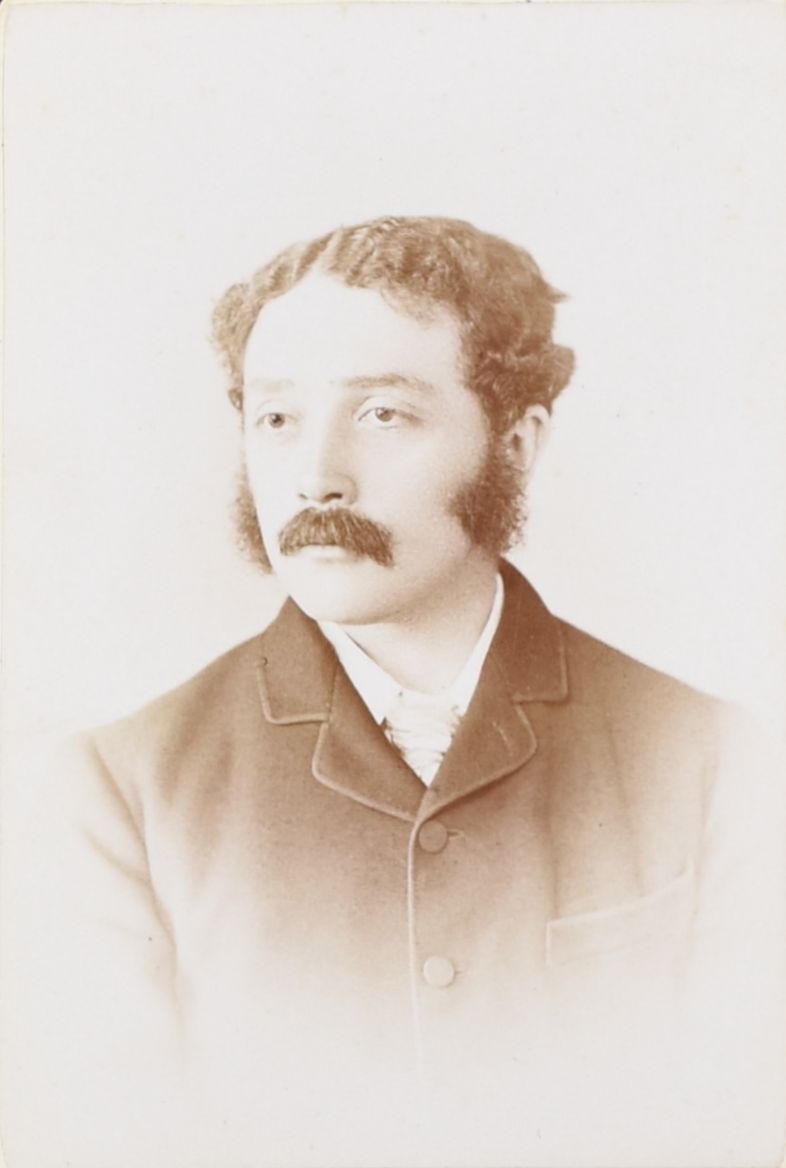
- Photographed by Ralph Herbert Lord in Cambridge
- Born: 26 December 1852; Glengairn, Aberdeenshire, Scotland
- Died: 19 June 1901 (aged 48)
- Resting place: Bridge of Gairn, Aberdeenshire
- Occupation: Classical scholar

Academic background
- Education: Aberdeen Grammar School; University of Aberdeen; Peterhouse, Cambridge

Academic work
- Discipline: Classical studies, Sanskrit, comparative philology
- Institutions: Pembroke College, Cambridge
- Notable students: Jane Ellen Harrison; Alan Wace

Robert Alexander Neil (26 December 1852 – 19 June 1901), who published as R. A. Neil, was a Scottish classical scholar. He lectured in classics at Pembroke College, Cambridge, and was University Lecturer in Sanskrit. He was acknowledged as an authority on Greek literature and on comparative philology, and collaborated with scholars including Edward Byles Cowell and Jane Ellen Harrison, to whom he may have been engaged at the time of his death.

Neil was born near Ballater in Aberdeenshire, the second son of a parish minister, who taught him classics from a young age. He was educated at Aberdeen Grammar School and received a scholarship to study classics at the University of Aberdeen, which he attended from the age of thirteen. After initially preparing himself for a medical career, he won a further scholarship in 1872 to read classics at Peterhouse, Cambridge. He graduated with a First, scoring the university's second-highest mark in tripos, in 1876.

Shortly after his graduation, Neil took a post at Pembroke to lecture in classics, and began studying Indian languages, particularly Sanskrit. Though he published little, Neil was a prolific lecturer and collaborator, particularly with Cowell and Harrison. He was made University Lecturer in Sanskrit in 1884, and examined both the classical tripos and that of Indian languages. In 1900, he became Pembroke's Senior Tutor. He also served on the senate of Cambridge University, on the council of the Society for the Promotion of Hellenic Studies, and on the syndicate of Cambridge University Press.

Neil died in 1901 of appendicitis. His final scholarly work, an edition of The Knights by the Athenian playwright Aristophanes, was published posthumously in the same year.

== Early life and education ==
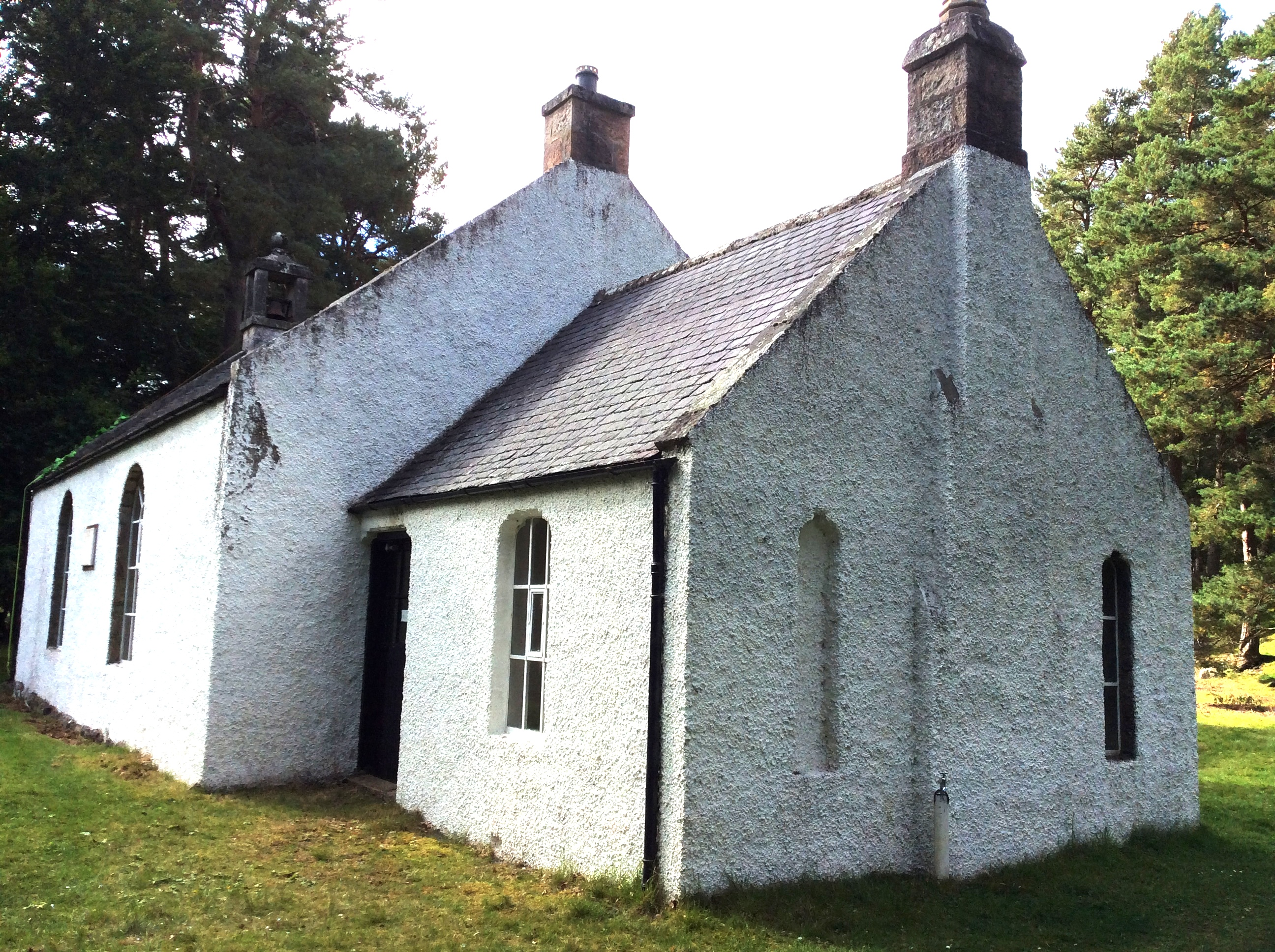
The church at Glengairn, where Neil's father was the parish minister

Robert Alexander Neil was born on 26 December 1852. He was the second son of Robert Neil, a minister in the Church of Scotland at the parish of Glengairn near Ballater in Aberdeenshire, and of Neil's wife, Mary Read. The younger Robert Neil was born in the manse at Glengairn. In an obituary of Neil published in 1912, his long-time friend Peter Giles recorded that Neil had been interested in books from a young age.

Neil was initially educated at a local school, run by a Mr. Coutts, and taught classics by his father. He later attended Aberdeen Grammar School, from which he was awarded a scholarship to the University of Aberdeen in 1866, at the age of thirteen. There, he was taught by the Hellenist William Duguid Geddes and was a contemporary of William Robertson Nicoll, later a journalist and writer. According to Nicoll, he and Neil were the two youngest in their year at the university. Neil placed top of Geddes's class at the end of his first year, and graduated from Aberdeen with a First, the highest possible degree class, in 1870. He was jointly awarded the university's Simpson Greek Prize alongside Alexander Shewan, who later became a Homeric scholar, in 1870; (Note: Giles 1912b, p. 1; The Numismatic Chronicle and Journal of the Numismatic Society 1901, p. 24. For Shewan's later career, see Bierl 2012, p. 135.) Neil was further awarded a Fullerton Scholarship in 1871. During the winter of 1871–72, he worked as a library assistant at Aberdeen before taking up the study of anatomy and chemistry. Neil won a university prize in the latter, and initially intended to graduate as a medical doctor; however, he instead took a scholarship in 1872 to Peterhouse, Cambridge, where he read classics.

Neil's teachers at Cambridge included the literary scholar A. W. Verrall and the ancient historians James Smith Reid and Richard Shilleto. Although Neil was initially disadvantaged by his limited experience of translation into Latin and Greek, which formed a major part of the Cambridge curriculum but had featured little at Aberdeen, he was awarded the Craven scholarship in 1875 and graduated as the second-highest-placed classicist in his year ("Second Classic") in 1876.

== Academic career ==
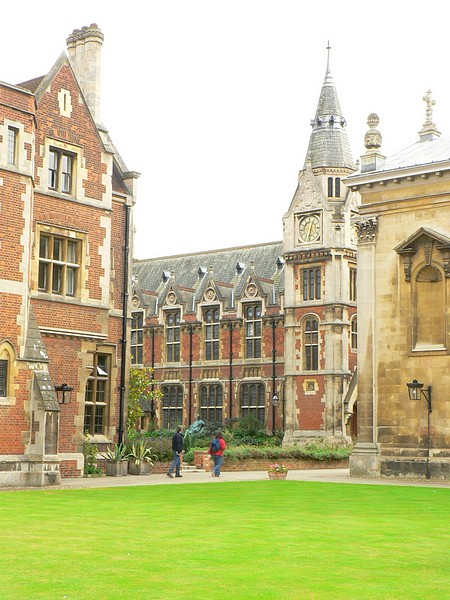
The Old Court of Pembroke College, where Neil was a fellow for his entire academic career

After his graduation from Peterhouse, Neil was elected as a fellow of Pembroke College, Cambridge, to lecture in classics, (Note: Robinson 2002, p. 126. For the discipline of Neil's fellowship, see Maier 2009, p. 223.) though he opted to deliver his public lectures at Peterhouse rather than Pembroke. His first publication, in 1877, was a series of corrections and comments upon the Greek dictionary first produced by Henry George Liddell and Robert Scott in 1843. (Note: Giles 1912b, p. 1; the article is Neil 1877. On Liddell and Scott's dictionary, see Stray 2019.) After his appointment, Neil began to study the classical Indian languages of Pali and Sanskrit under Edward Byles Cowell, Cambridge's first professor of Sanskrit. Neil and Cowell spent afternoons together, a few times each week, reading Sanskrit works; they initially focused on the Hindu Rigveda, but gradually came to concentrate on Buddhist literature. Neil published an edition of the Divyavadana, an anthology of Sanskrit Buddhist literature, jointly with Cowell in 1886, and collaborated on Cowell's 1895 compilation and translation of the Jataka tales, stories from the Indian subcontinent concerning the birth of the Buddha. (Note: Giles 1912b, p. 1 (for the Divyavadana); Maier 2009, p. 223 (for the Jataka tales).)

Alongside his classical post at Pembroke, Neil was appointed University Lecturer in Sanskrit in 1884. He served as an examiner in the Indian Languages tripos as well as in classics, where students opting for classical philology ("Section E") in their final year had to sit a Sanskrit paper in order to achieve a First. In addition to his work in Greek, Latin and Indian languages, Neil shared with Cowell an interest in the comparative linguistics of those languages and Celtic. In his classical capacity, he lectured frequently on the history of Greek comedy, on the lyric poet Pindar, and on the philosopher Plato. In 1900, he took the post of Senior Tutor at Pembroke following the death of his predecessor, C. H. Pryor; according to Giles, Neil did so "with some hesitation". He was also a long-time member of the syndicate of Cambridge University Press, and served for four years on the council of the university senate.

Neil became a close friend of James Adam, another Scottish classicist and Aberdeen alumnus who took a fellowship at Emmanuel College in December 1884. The two kept a strict appointment for Sunday lunch together, which lasted from their meeting until Neil's death, sixteen years later. Neil was best man at Adam's wedding to the classicist Adela Marion Kensington in 1890, (Note: Oakley 2011, p. 26. For the date, see Giles 1912a, p. 13.) and in 1891 Adam named his first son, Neil Kensington Adam, after him. Neil also befriended William Robertson Smith, another Scotsman and a theologian; he wrote Smith's obituary in the literary magazine The Bookman. The archaeologist John Evans also considered Neil a close friend. Among Neil's tutees at Pembroke was the future archaeologist Alan Wace; Neil suggested to Wace that he should study classical archaeology for Part II, the final year of his degree: Wace took this advice and achieved a First with distinction in the examinations of 1901. (Note: Gill 2004; Wills 2015, p. 148 (for the date).) The archaeological historian David Gill has described Neil as a "key influence" on Wace.

Neil supported the education of women and for a while delivered lectures at Cambridge's two women's colleges, Newnham and Girton. (Note: Maier 2009, p. 223. Giles's obituary says that Neil stopped these lectures when his "college work became very heavy", but does not specify the date.) Neil probably met the classicist Jane Ellen Harrison, one of the first women to make an academic career in England, in 1892, when the two were both on the council of the Society for the Promotion of Hellenic Studies. Harrison took a post as a resident lecturer at Newnham in 1898, and studied Sanskrit and the history of Indian religions under Neil. She began to collaborate on her academic work with him; according to Harrison's biographer Annabel Robinson, his expertise in philology remedied what Harrison considered to be her greatest weakness in classical scholarship. The two were probably engaged to marry at the time of his death. (Note: Maier reports their engagement as fact; Robinson traces the suggestion to Hope Mirrlees and considers it plausible but uncertain. Beard calls the engagement possible, citing a letter from Mirlees stating that Neil wished to marry Harrison at the time of his death.) Harrison later wrote, in 1913, that Neil's "sympathetic ... silences made the dreariest gatherings burn and glow"; (Note: Harrison 1913, pp. 22–25, quoted in Robinson 2002, p. 126.) Robinson has also highlighted Neil's being "physically attractive and strongly built" as a source of their romance. She has suggested that Harrison's relationship with Neil may have been a source of scandal immediately before his death, referencing a comment in the notebook of Harrison's companion and collaborator Hope Mirrlees that Harrison had been forced to leave Cambridge in order to distance herself from an unnamed man, following an unspecified "disaster" in their relationship. She returned two weeks before Neil's death.

Neil died on the morning of 19 June 1901, following a short bout of appendicitis. (Note: The Numismatic Chronicle and Journal of the Numismatic Society 1901, p. 24. For the cause, see Robinson 2002, p. 141.) He was buried at Bridge of Gairn in Aberdeenshire, close to Glengairn and to the house he had built in Ballater. (Note: Giles 1912b, p. 2. For Neil's house, see Nicoll 1905, p. 54.) His final work – an edition of The Knights by the fifth-century BCE Athenian playwright Aristophanes – was published posthumously in 1901, with the assistance of Neil's friend Leonard Whibley and another friend and colleague by the initials W. S. H.

== Assessment, honours and legacy ==
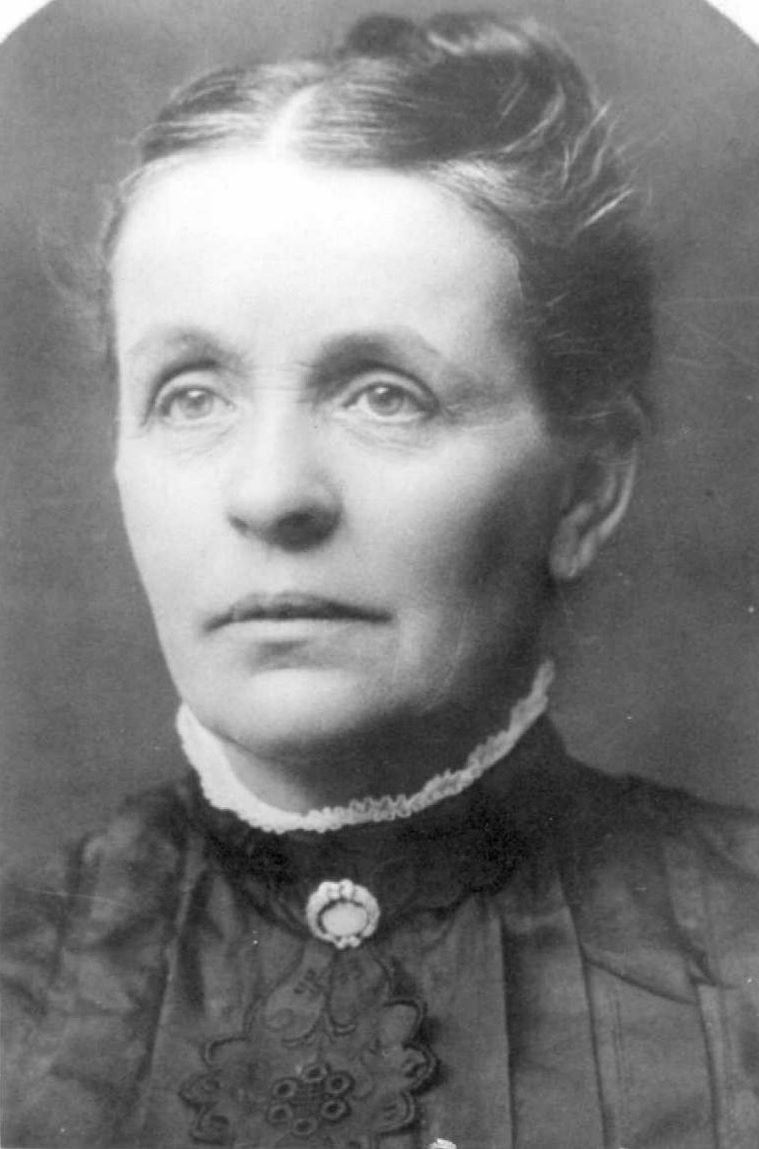
Jane Ellen Harrison, photographed in 1900

In 1891, the University of Aberdeen awarded Neil an honorary Doctor of Letters degree. He was elected a member of the Numismatic Society of London in 1892. He served for several years on the council of the Society for the Promotion of Hellenic Studies. On Neil's death, the society's president, Richard Jebb, described him as "a classical scholar of rare learning and acumen". His edition of The Knights received a critical review by the German classicist Konrad Zacher, who described Neil's handling of the play's manuscript tradition as undisciplined and accused him of lacking "genuine philological education". However, Hugh Lloyd-Jones, the Regius Professor of Greek at the University of Oxford, wrote in 2002 that Neil's edition was still of scholarly value.

Neil's record of publications was comparatively short, though Robinson has noted that he instead focused his scholarly energies on assisting friends with their own work. Jane Ellen Harrison described Sunday lunches with Neil as "the best intellectual thing in Cambridge" in a letter to the archaeologist Jessie Crum, her sometime student and travel companion. His intellectual interests were broad, including ancient and medieval architecture, western European cathedrals, and Scottish history; he was a member of the Franco-Scottish Society. He was temporarily a member of London's Savile Club, though Nicoll judged that he was less comfortable in London society than among his friends in Cambridge.

Neil's sisters, Mary E. and Catherine G. Neil, endowed in 1953 the R. A. Neil prizes at the University of Aberdeen – two awards of £35 (equivalent to £800 in 2025) for examination results in classics.

== Selected works ==
=== As sole author ===
- Neil, Robert Alexander (1877). "Notes on Liddell and Scott". The Journal of Philology. 7 (13): 200–204.
- — (May 1894). "Professor Robertson Smith". The Bookman: 42–44. (Note: For Neil's authorship of this article, published anonymously, see Nicoll 1905, p. 50, and Maier 2009, p. 223.)
- —, ed. (1901). The Knights of Aristophanes. Cambridge: Cambridge University Press. OCLC 556755370.

=== As co-author ===
- Cowell, Edward Byles; Neil, Robert Alexander (1886). The Divyâvadâna: A Collection of Early Buddhist Legends. Cambridge: Cambridge University Press. OCLC 490000929.

== Works cited ==
- Aberdeen University Calendar 1961–1962. Aberdeen: University of Aberdeen. 1961.
- Beard, Mary (2002) [2000]. The Invention of Jane Harrison. Cambridge, MA: Harvard University Press. ISBN 0674008073.
- Bierl, Anton (2012). "Orality, Fluid Textualization and Interweaving Themes: Some Remarks on the Doloneia: Magical Horses from Night to Light and Death to Life". In Montanari, Franco; Rengakos, Antonios; Tsagalis, Christos (eds.). Homeric Contexts: Neoanalysis and the Interpretation of Oral Poetry. Berlin/Boston: De Gruyter. pp. 133–174. ISBN 9783110271959.
- Carrington, A.; Hills, G. J.; Webb, K. R. (1974). "Neil Kensington Adam 1891–1973". Biographical Memoirs of Fellows of the Royal Society. 20: 1–26. doi:10.1098/rsbm.1974.0001. JSTOR 769631.
- Clackson, James (2021). "Dangerous Lunatics: Comparative Philology in Cambridge and Beyond". In Pelling, Christopher; Harrison, Stephen (eds.). Classical Scholarship and Its History: From the Renaissance to the Present: Essays in Honour of Christopher Stray. Berlin/Boston: De Gruyter. pp. 131–154. ISBN 9783110719215.
- Giles, Peter (1912a). "Adam, James" . In Lee, Sidney (ed.). Dictionary of National Biography (2nd supplement). Vol. 1. London: Smith, Elder & Co. pp. 12–14.
- Giles, Peter (1912b). "Neil, Robert Alexander" . In Lee, Sidney (ed.). Dictionary of National Biography (2nd supplement). Vol. 3. London: Smith, Elder & Co. pp. 1–2.
- Gill, David (2004). "Wace, Alan John Bayard (1879–1957)". Oxford Dictionary of National Biography (online ed.). Oxford University Press. doi:10.1093/ref:odnb/74552. (Subscription, Wikipedia Library access or UK public library membership required.)
- Gill, David (2011). "Sifting the Soil of Greece: The Early Years of the British School at Athens (1886–1919". Bulletin of the Institute of Classical Studies Supplements. 111: iii–474. JSTOR 44214938.
- Harrison, Jane Ellen (1913). "Woman and Knowledge". Newnham College Letter.
- "List of Members of the Numismatic Society of London, December 1893". The Numismatic Chronicle and Journal of the Numismatic Society. 13: 1, 3–15. 1893. JSTOR 42679717.
- Lloyd-Jones, Hugh (2002). "Reviewed Work: The Invention of Jane Harrison by Mary Beard". International Journal of the Classical Tradition. 9 (2): 339–343. JSTOR 30224329.
- Maier, Bernhard (2009). William Robertson Smith: His Life, His Work and His Times. Tübingen: Mohr Siebeck. ISBN 9783161499951.
- Nicoll, William Robertson (1905). "Dr. Robert A. Neil". The Day Book of Claudius Clear. London: Hodder & Stoughton. pp. 43–56. OCLC 697713842 – via Internet Archive.
- Oakley, Ann (2011). A Critical Woman: Barbara Wootton, Social Science and Public Policy in the Twentieth Century. London: Bloomsbury Academic. ISBN 9781849664684.
- "Proceedings of the Numismatic Society: Session 1900–1901". The Numismatic Chronicle and Journal of the Numismatic Society. 4. 1: 1–35. 1901. JSTOR 42679755.
- Robinson, Annabel (2002). The Life and Work of Jane Ellen Harrison. Oxford: Oxford University Press. ISBN 9780199242337.
- Schlesier, Renate (2015). Kulte, Mythen und Gelehrte: Anthropologie der Antike seit 1800 [Cults, Myths and Scholars: Anthropology of Antiquity Since 1800] (in German). Berlin: Fischer. ISBN 9783596119240.
- "Session 1900–1901". The Journal of Hellenic Studies. 21: xxxiii–xliv. 1901. JSTOR 623860.
- Smith, Dale M. (2 May 2017). "Harrison, Jane (1850–1928)". Routledge Encyclopaedia of Modernism. doi:10.4324/9781135000356-REM1347-1. ISBN 978-1-135-00035-6.
- Stray, Christopher (2019). "A Note on the History of the Lexicon". In Stray, Christopher; Katz, Joshua Timothy; Clarke, Michael J. (eds.). Liddell and Scott: The History, Methodology, and Languages of the World's Leading Lexicon of Ancient Greek. Oxford: Oxford University Press. pp. xvii–xviii. ISBN 9780198810803.
- "University Intelligence". The Cambridge Review. 20 June 1887.
- Wills, David (2015). "The Salonica Campaign of the First World War from an Archaeologist's Perspective: Alan J. B. Wace's Greece Untrodden (1964)" (PDF). Balkan Studies. 50: 139–157.
- Zacher, Konrad (20 June 1903). "The Knights of Aristophanes Edited by Robert Alexander Neil". Berliner Philologische Wochenschrift [Berlin Philological Weekly] (in German). 23 (25). columns 769–776.
