= The Wolf (magazine) =

British poetry magazine

- Issue 15 cover
- Editor: James Byrne
- Categories: Poetry magazine
- Frequency: Two-three per year
- Founder: Nicholas Cobic & James Byrne
- First issue: April 2002
- Country: United Kingdom
- Based in: London
- Language: English
- Website: www.wolfmagazine.co.uk

The Wolf magazine was an independent poetry magazine published twice a year and based in England. Established in April 2002 by Nicholas Cobic and James Byrne, The Wolf published hundreds of new poets alongside more established writers from across the world. Poets featured included Adonis, Derek Walcott, Carolyn Forche, Charles Bernstein, John Kinsella, C.D. Wright, Niall McDevitt, Geraldine Monk, Ishion Hutchinson and Ilya Kaminsky. A strong regard for international poetry, critical prose, activist, transnational and transatlantic poetics and poetry in translation was central to The Wolf's aesthetic. It regularly featured introductions to contemporary poetries across the world, including writing from Burmese, Cuban, Syrian, Ukrainian and Croatian poets.

The magazine included interviews with leading contemporary poets, poems, translations, book reviews and critical prose. Its critical work included pieces on Anne Carson, Muriel Rukeyser, John Ashbery, Kay Boyle, plus interviews with Charles Bernstein, Vahni Capildeo, Marilyn Hacker, Robert Sheppard and Yusef Komunyakaa, among others. Additionally, The Wolf featured contemporary art work with an artist-in-residence in each of its 35 issues, printing a centrefold of original work. Reem Yassouf, Patricia Farrell and Marcela Ramirez-Aza were among the artists who published prints of their work in the magazine.

The Wolf magazine was, in 2008, given the support of the Arts Council, England. In 2010 it became fully independent again, relying entirely upon subscriptions. Nicholas Cobic and Byrne were co-Editors from 2002-2005 (issue 1-9). From 2008-2017 Sandeep Parmar was the Reviews Editor of the magazine whilst Byrne continued as Editor (issue 17-35). Issues 22-24 were published in New York City whilst the magazine editors were based there. 'The Wolf: A Decade (2002-2012)' was launched at Poetry Parnassus in London and featured readings from Nicholas Cobic, Ishion Hutchinson, Valzhyna Mort, Alvin Pang, Ilya Kaminsky and Sandeep Parmar. The magazine was known to organise tour events on both sides of the Atlantic. Several writers including Alibhe Darcy, Kate Potts and Siddhartha Bose participated in The Wolf Workshops between 2007 and 2008.

In October 2017, after fifteen years in circulation, The Wolf announced that it had published its final print issue.
