= Paris: A Poem =

Modernist poem by Hope Mirrlees

Paris: A Poem is a long poem by Hope Mirrlees, described as "modernism's lost masterpiece" by critic Julia Briggs. Mirrlees wrote the six-hundred-line poem in spring 1919. Although the title page of the first edition mistakenly has the year 1919, it was first published in 1920 by Leonard and Virginia Woolf at the Hogarth Press. Only 175 copies of the first edition were distributed. In 2011, the poem was reprinted in an edition of Mirrlees's Collected Poems, edited by Sandeep Parmar, which helped create more critical interest.

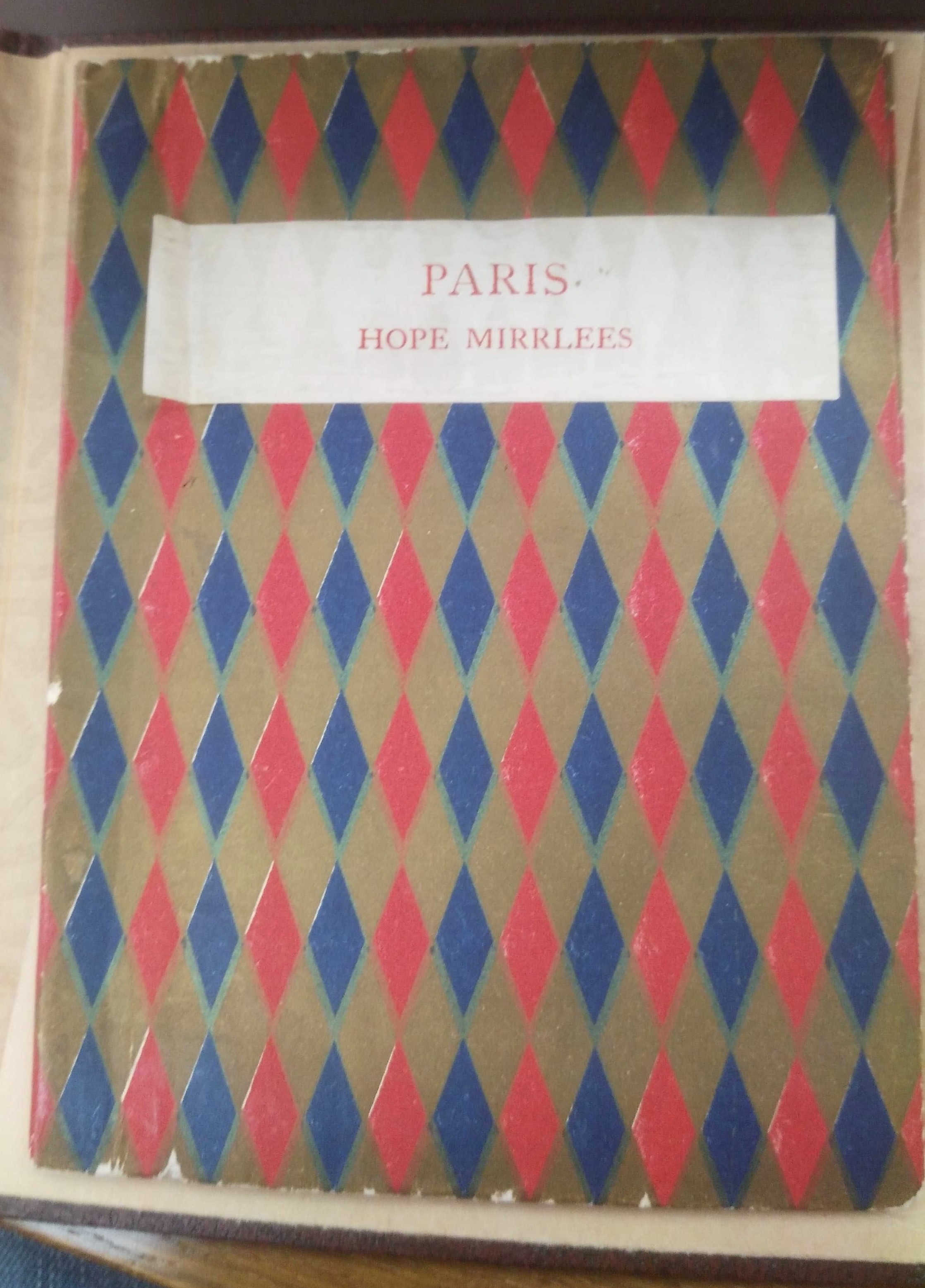
First edition of Paris: A Poem

The poem is a psychogeography of post-World War I Paris. The speaker goes on a day-long stroll, beginning in a Metro tunnel, before emerging onto the streets and visiting sites such as gardens and museums. References to advertisements, works of art, literature, and music, as well as conversation fragments, are interspersed throughout. Parts of the poem imitate the appearance of the thing being described, such as posters and plaques. While the poem is primarily written in English, many of the lines use French and a couple of words are in Greek. Mirrlees never wrote anything similar in style after Paris.

== Publishing history ==
The first edition of the poem, Hogarth Press's fifth publication, was printed and sewn together by hand. Due to the poem's unusual typographic elements, it was the most ambitious work the Woolfs had printed thus far. The cover uses paper with a red, blue, and gold harlequin pattern. Mirrlees was very particular about the lettering and layout of the words on the page. She was still making handwritten changes to her poem in the typesetting stage. Virginia Woolf had to pencil in corrections in 160 of the 175 copies of the poem. The first edition still included spelling mistakes. Despite Leonard Woolf's request in 1946, she refused to reissue the poem. Mirrlees made significant changes to the poem when it was republished in the Virginia Woolf Quarterly in 1973. By this point she had converted to Catholicism and removed passages which she considered to be "blasphemous". It was the only time the poem was reprinted while she was alive. In 2007, Julia Briggs included a facsimile copy of the poem with additional notes in Gender in Modernism. Briggs's notes were included in the reprint of Paris in Collected Poems.

== Themes ==
=== World War I ===
The speaker encounters ghosts and spirits of fallen soldiers amidst real landmarks in Paris. She imagines little boys riding a carousel in the Tuileries becoming soldiers. Mirrlees connects the image of their sticky hands with trenches. Later, she uses the image of "Children hung with amulets" to represent reincarnated soldiers. They wear "Blue smocks," a reference to the blue uniforms of the French soldiers in the war. She mentions pigeons as well, which were used extensively to deliver military information.

The speaker also walks through the Place de la Concorde. For Briggs, this site represents a tension between reconciliation and danger: "Concorde," meaning "agreement" or "harmony," brings to mind the Paris Peace Conference; however, many executions have also taken place at this square.

In addition, the poem refers to "petites bourgeoises" who gathered money for war victims; Picardie, a province where many of the battles took place during the war; and the First Battle of the Marne, which led to a large number of casualties for the French.

=== Race ===
The beginning of the poem includes multiple references to brand names ("Zig-Zag," "Lion Noir," and "Cacao Blooker"), which Briggs describes as introducing themes of empire and blackness. A reference to "YANKEES" in the poem refers to Americans who stayed in Europe after World War I. Briggs notes that some African-Americans moved to Montmartre because it was a more tolerant place. Later, a description of black music notes turns into African-American musicians playing jazz. Briggs points out that although the reference to jazz introduces ideas of liberation, for a present-day reader, the language used in this scene is very racist.

== Influences ==
Mirrlees acknowledged that Jean Cocteau's Le Cap de Bonne-Espérance was a major influence for Paris. Both poems mention Byrrh and "St. John at Patmos." Parmar conjectures that Mirrlees might have also been influenced by her friend Gertrude Stein. She may have been influenced by Futurism (literature), as it is likely that she read Vladimir Mayakovsky's poetry while studying languages at École des Langues Orientales in 1918. Briggs positions Mirrlees within a lineage of French poets who experimented with typography, such as Stéphane Mallarmé and Guillaume Apollinaire. John T. Connor claims that her work also pays homage to the salon poems of Anna de Noailles and Agnes Mary Frances Duclaux.

== Reception ==
Virginia Woolf described the poem as being "very obscure, indecent, and brilliant." However, British reviewers generally had a negative reaction to Paris when it was first published. One review from The Times Literary Supplement in 1920 claimed that the poem's use of typography "might be part of a nursery game. It does not belong to the art of poetry."

Contemporary critics have noted that Paris uses techniques that anticipate important modernist works. Like Virginia Woolf's Mrs Dalloway and James Joyce's Ulysses, the poem depicts a single day in a modern city and explores the unconscious. With its fragmented voices and inclusion of notes written by the author, it also anticipates The Waste Land by T. S. Eliot. Parmar speculates that because Eliot also published his poetry with the Hogarth Press, he probably knew that Paris existed and may have even read it before writing The Waste Land.
