= Lud-in-the-Mist =

1926 novel by Hope Mirrlees

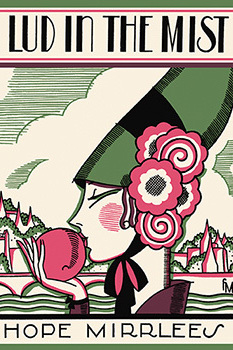
- First US edition
- Author: Hope Mirrlees
- Language: English
- Genre: Fantasy novel
- Published: 1926 Collins
- Publication place: United Kingdom
- Media type: Print (Hardback)
- Pages: 319 pp
- ISBN: 978-1-8579-8767-6 (2008 ed)

Lud-in-the-Mist (1926) is the third and final novel by the British writer Hope Mirrlees. It continues the author's exploration of the themes of Life and Art, by a method already described in the preface of her first novel, Madeleine: One of Love's Jansenists (1919): "to turn from time to time upon the action the fantastic limelight of eternity, with a sudden effect of unreality and the hint of a world within a world".

== Summary ==
Lud-in-the-Mist begins with a quotation by Jane Harrison, with whom Mirrlees lived in London and Paris, and whose influence is also found in Madeleine and The Counterplot. The book is dedicated to the memory of Mirrlees's father.

In the novel, the prosaic and law-abiding inhabitants of Lud-in-the-Mist, a city located at the confluence of the rivers Dapple and Dawl, in the fictional state of Dorimare, must contend with the influx of fairy fruit and the effect of the fantastic inhabitants of the bordering land of Faerie, whose presence and very existence they had sought to banish from their rational lives. When the denial proves futile, their mayor, the respectable Nathaniel Chanticleer, finds himself involved reluctantly with the conflict and obliged to change his conventional personal life and disregard the traditions of Lud-in-the-Mist to find a reconciliation.

== Publication history ==
Whereas in the novels Madeleine and The Counterplot Mirrlees adapted elements from history, religion and literature, her use of a secondary-world setting in Lud-in-the-Mist associates it with the tradition of high fantasy, and thereby with its current popularity.

In 1970, an American reprint was published without the author's permission, as part of the Ballantine Adult Fantasy series. According to that volume's introduction, Lin Carter, the series editor, could not locate the author. The book had fallen into the public domain in the United States as the copyright had not been renewed in 1954 or 1955, which was the statute at the time.

It was reprinted subsequently by Orion Books in 2000 as part of their Fantasy Masterworks series. A more recent republication by the Cold Spring Press includes a foreword by Neil Gaiman and an introduction by Douglas A. Anderson.

== Reception ==
In a 1946 discussion of fantastic literature, Edward Wagenknecht referred to "Hope Mirrlees' unappreciated masterpiece Lud-in-the-Mist".

David Langford and Mike Ashley describe Lud-in-the-Mist as "a moving book, shifting unpredictably from drollery to menace to a high poignancy that sticks in the mind".

Lud-in-the-Mist had been named a source of inspiration to multiple fantasy and science fiction authors. Michael Swanwick called it "one of the least known and most influential of modern fantasies". Elizabeth Hand and Tim Powers have both named it as a source of inspiration. Neil Gaiman described Lud as "one of the finest [fantasy novels] in the English language. ... It is a little golden miracle of a book." He described Mirrlees's writing as "elegant, supple, effective and haunting: the author demands a great deal from her readers, which she repays many times over." He says that it is one of his top ten favourite books.

== Adaptation ==
Joy Wilkinson wrote an adaptation for BBC Radio 4, which broadcast on 30 October 2021. It starred Olivia Poulet, Richard Lumsden and Lloyd Hutchinson. Neil Gaiman was cast as Duke Aubrey.
