= Myth and ritual =

Two central components of religious practice

Myth and ritual are two central components of religious practice. Although myth and ritual are commonly united as parts of religion, the exact relationship between them has been a matter of controversy among scholars. One of the approaches to this problem is "the myth and ritual, or myth-ritualist, theory," held notably by the so-called Cambridge Ritualists, which holds that "myth does not stand by itself but is tied to ritual." This theory is still disputed; many scholars now believe that myth and ritual share common paradigms, but not that one developed from the other.

== Overview ==
The "myth and ritual school" is the name given to a series of authors who have focused their philological studies on the "ritual purposes of myths." Some of these scholars (e.g., W. Robertson-Smith, James George Frazer, Jane Ellen Harrison, S. H. Hooke) supported the "primacy of ritual" hypothesis, which claimed that "every myth is derived from a particular ritual and that the syntagmatic quality of myth is a reproduction of the succession of ritual act."

Historically, the important approaches to the study of mythological thinking have been those of Vico, Schelling, Schiller, Jung, Freud, Lucien Lévy-Bruhl, Lévi-Strauss, Frye, the Soviet school, and the Myth and Ritual School.

In the 1930s, Soviet researchers such as Jakov E. Golosovker, Frank-Kamenecky, Olga Freidenberg, Mikhail Bakhtin, "grounded the study of myth and ritual in folklore and in the world view of popular culture."

Following World War II, the semantic study of myth and ritual, particularly by Bill Stanner and Victor Turner, has supported a connection between myth and ritual. However, it has not supported the notion that one preceded and produced the other, as supporters of the "primacy of ritual" hypothesis would claim. According to the currently dominant scholarly view, the link between myth and ritual is that they share common paradigms.

== Ritual from myth ==
One possibility immediately presents itself: perhaps ritual arose from myth. Many religious rituals—notably Passover among Jews, Christmas and Easter among Christians, and the Hajj among Muslims—commemorate, or involve commemoration of, events in religious literature.

=== E. B. Tylor ===
Leaving the sphere of historical religions, the ritual-from-myth approach often sees the relationship between myth and ritual as analogous to the relationship between science and technology. The pioneering anthropologist Edward Burnett Tylor is the classic exponent of this view. He saw myth as an attempt to explain the world: for him, myth was a sort of proto-science. Ritual is secondary: just as technology is an application of science, so ritual is an application of myth—an attempt to produce certain effects, given the supposed nature of the world: "For Tylor, myth functions to explain the world as an end in itself. Ritual applies that explanation to control the world." A ritual always presupposes a preexisting myth: in short, myth gives rise to ritual.

== Myth from ritual (primacy of ritual) ==
Against the intuitive idea that ritual reenacts myth or applies mythical theories, many 19th-century anthropologists supported the opposite position: that myth and religious doctrine result from ritual. This is known as the "primacy of ritual" hypothesis.

=== William Robertson Smith ===
This view was asserted for the first time by the bible scholar William Robertson Smith. The scholar Meletinsky notes that Smith introduced the concept "dogmatically." In his Lectures on the Religion of the Semites (1889), Smith draws a distinction between ancient and modern religion: in modern religion, doctrine is central; in ancient religion, ritual is central. On the whole, Smith argues, ancients tended to be conservative with regard to rituals, making sure to pass them down faithfully. In contrast, the myths that justified those rituals could change. In fact, according to Smith, many of the myths that have come down to us arose "after the original, nonmythic reason [...] for the ritual had somehow been forgotten."

As an example, Smith gives the worship of Adonis. Worshipers mourned Adonis's mythical death in a ritual that coincided with the annual withering of the vegetation. According to Smith, the ritual mourning originally had a nonmythical explanation: with the annual withering of plants, "the worshippers lament out of natural sympathy [...] just as modern man is touched with melancholy at the falling of autumn leaves." Once worshipers forgot the original, nonmythical reason for the mourning ritual, they created "the myth of Adonis as the dying and rising god of vegetation [...] to account for the ritual."

=== Stanley Edgar Hyman ===
In his essay "The Ritual View of Myth and the Mythic", (1955) Stanley Edgar Hyman makes an argument similar to Smith's:

"In Fiji [...] the physical peculiarities of an island with only one small patch of fertile soil are explained by a myth telling how Mberewalaki, a culture hero, flew into a passion at the misbehavior of the people of the island and hurled all the soil he was bringing them in a heap, instead of laying it out properly. Hocart points out that the myth is used aetiologically to explain the nature of the island, but did not originate in that attempt. The adventures of Mberewalaki originated, like all mythology, in ritual performance, and most of the lore of Hocart's Fijian informants consisted of such ritual myths. When they get interested in the topology of the island or are asked about it, Hocart argues, they do precisely what we would do, which is ransack their lore for an answer."

Here Hyman argues against the etiological interpretation of myth, which says that myths originated from attempts to explain the origins (etiologies) of natural phenomena. If true, the etiological interpretation would make myth older than, or at least independent of, ritual—as E.B. Tylor believes it is. But Hyman argues that people use myth for etiological purposes only after myth is already in place: in short, myths didn't originate as explanations of natural phenomena. Further, Hyman argues, myth originated from ritual performance. Thus, ritual came before myth, and myth depends on ritual for its existence until it gains an independent status as an etiological story.

=== James Frazer ===
The famous anthropologist Sir James George Frazer claimed that myth emerges from ritual during the natural process of religious evolution. Many of his ideas were inspired by those of Robertson Smith. In The Golden Bough (1890; 1906–1915), Frazer famously argues that man progresses from belief in magic (and rituals based on magic), through belief in religion, to science. His argument is as follows.

Man starts out with a reflexive belief in a natural law. He thinks he can influence nature by correctly applying this law: "In magic man depends on his own strength to meet the difficulties and dangers that beset him on every side. He believes in a certain established order of nature on which he can surely count, and which he can manipulate for his own ends."

However, the natural law man imagines—namely, magic—does not work. When he sees that his pretended natural law is false, man gives up the idea of a knowable natural law and "throws himself humbly on the mercy of certain great invisible beings behind the veil of nature, to whom he now ascribes all those far-reaching powers which he once arrogated to himself." In other words, when man loses his belief in magic, he justifies his formerly magical rituals by saying that they reenact myths or honor mythical beings. According to Frazer,

"myth changes while custom remains constant; men continue to do what their fathers did before them, though the reasons on which their fathers acted have been long forgotten. The history of religion is a long attempt to reconcile old custom with new reason, to find a sound theory for an absurd practice."

=== Jane Ellen Harrison and S. H. Hooke ===
The classicist Jane Ellen Harrison and the biblical scholar S. H. Hooke regarded myth as intimately connected to ritual. However, "against Smith," they "vigorously deny" that myth's main purpose is to justify a ritual by giving an account of how it first arose (e.g., justifying the Adonis worshipers' ritual mourning by attributing it to Adonis's mythical death). Instead, these scholars think a myth is largely just a narrative description of a corresponding ritual: according to Harrison, "the primary meaning of myth ... is the spoken correlative of the acted rite, the thing done."

Harrison and Hooke gave an explanation for why ancients would feel the need to describe the ritual in a narrative form. They suggest that the spoken word, like the acted ritual, was considered to have magical potency: "The spoken word had the efficacy of an act."

Like Frazer, Harrison believed that myths could arise as the initial reason a ritual was forgotten or became diluted. As an example, she cited rituals that center on the annual renewal of vegetation. Such rituals often involve a participant who undergoes a staged death and resurrection. Harrison argues that the ritual, although "performed annually, was exclusively initiatory"; it was performed on people to initiate them into their roles as full-standing members of society. At this early point, the "god" was simply "the projection of the euphoria produced by the ritual." Later, however, this euphoria became personified as a distinct god, and this god later became the god of vegetation, for "just as the initiates symbolically died and were reborn as fully fledged members of society, so the god of vegetation and in turn crops literally died and were reborn." In time, people forgot the ritual's initiatory function and only remembered its status as a commemoration of the Adonis myth.

== Myth and ritual as non-coextensive ==
Not all students of mythology think ritual emerged from myth or myth emerged from ritual: some allow myths and rituals a greater degree of freedom from one another. Although myths and rituals often appear together, these scholars do not think every myth has or had a corresponding ritual, or vice versa.

=== Walter Burkert ===
The classicist Walter Burkert believes myths and rituals were originally independent. When myths and rituals do come together, he argues, they do so to reinforce each other. A myth that tells how the gods established a ritual reinforces that ritual by giving it divine status: "Do this because the gods did or do it." A ritual based on a mythical event makes the story of that event more than a mere myth: the myth becomes more important because it narrates an event whose imitation is considered sacred.

Furthermore, Burkert argues that myth and ritual together serve a "socializing function." As an example, Burkert gives the example of hunting rituals. Hunting, Burkert argues, took on a sacred, ritualistic aura once it ceased to be necessary for survival: "Hunting lost its basic function with the emergence of agriculture some ten thousand years ago. But hunting ritual had become so important that it could not be given up." By performing the ritual of hunting together, an ancient society bonded itself together as a group, and also provided a way for its members to vent their anxieties over their own aggressiveness and mortality.

=== Bronisław Malinowski ===
Like William Smith, the anthropologist Bronisław Malinowski argued in his essay Myth in Primitive Psychology (1926) that myths function as fictitious accounts of the origin of rituals, thereby providing a justification for those rituals: myth "gives rituals a hoary past and thereby sanctions them." However, Malinowski also points out that many cultural practices besides ritual have related myths: for Malinowski, "myth and ritual are therefore not coextensive." In other words, not all myths are outgrowths of ritual, and not all rituals are outgrowths of myth.

=== Mircea Eliade ===
Like Malinowski, the religious scholar Mircea Eliade thinks one important function of myth is to provide an explanation for ritual. Eliade notes that, in many societies, rituals are considered important precisely because they were established by the mythical gods or heroes. Eliade approvingly quotes Malinowski's claim that a myth is "a narrative resurrection of a primeval reality." Eliade adds: "Because myth relates the gesta [deeds] of Supernatural Beings [...] it becomes the exemplary model for all significant human actions." Traditional man sees mythical figures as models to be imitated. Therefore, societies claim that many of their rituals were established by mythical figures, thereby making the rituals seem all the more important. However, also like Malinowski, Eliade notes that societies use myths to sanction many kinds of activities, not just rituals: "For him, too, then, myth and ritual are not coextensive."

Eliade goes beyond Malinowski by giving an explanation for why myth can confer such an importance upon ritual: according to Eliade, "when [ritually] [re-]enacted myth acts as a time machine, carrying one back to the time of the myth and thereby bringing one closer to god." But, again, for Eliade myth and ritual are not coextensive: the same return to the mythical age can be achieved simply by retelling a myth, without any ritual reenactment. According to Eliade, traditional man sees both myths and rituals as vehicles for "eternal return" to the mythical age (see Eternal return (Eliade)):

"In imitating the exemplary acts of a god or of a mythic hero, or simply by recounting their adventures, the man of an archaic society detaches himself from profane time and magically re-enters the Great Time, the sacred time."

Recital of myths and enactment of rituals serve a common purpose: they are two different means to remain in sacred time.

== See also ==
General

- Comparative mythology
- Mythology
- Ritology
- Religion and mythology
- Magic and religion
- Etiology
- Anthropology of religion

People

- Walter Burkert

Book

- Myth: Its Meaning and Functions in Ancient and Other Cultures by G.S. Kirk
