= The Counterplot =

1924 novel

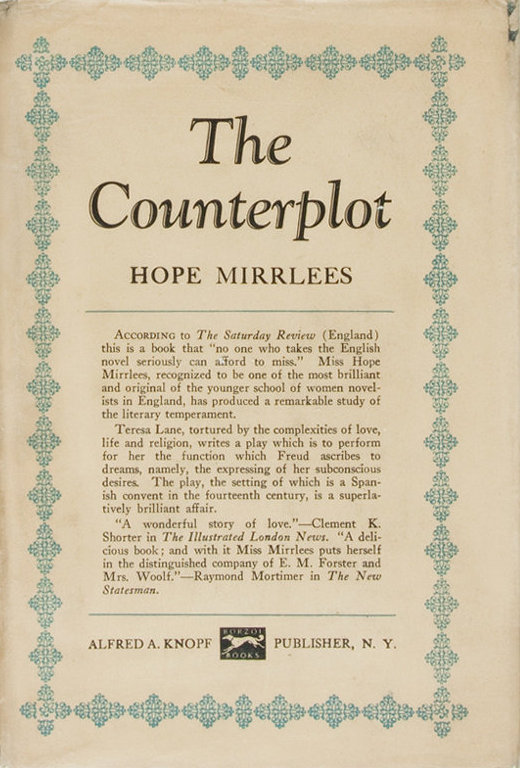
- First US edition cover
- Author: Hope Mirrlees
- Language: English
- Publisher: Collins (UK)
- Publication date: 1924
- Publication place: United Kingdom
- Media type: Print (Hardback & paperback)

The Counterplot is the second novel by Hope Mirrlees. Written in 1923, it was originally published in 1924, and is the only one of Mirrlees's three novels to take place in then-contemporary settings, Madeleine: One of Love's Jansenists (1919) being a historical novel, while Lud-in-the-Mist (1926) is a fantasy.

Hope Mirrlees dedicated The Counterplot to Jane Harrison, with a Greek epigram taken from Homer's Odyssey, which translates to "nothing is greater than when two people keep house together, man and wife, a great grief to enemies and joy to friends." A list of books by the same publisher, appended at the end of the novel, includes a brief description of The Counterplot, calling it "a study of the literary temperament".

== Synopsis ==
The novel's protagonist is Teresa Lane, a woman of 28, living in Plasencia, a villa in the southeast of England, shortly after World War I, who studies the spectacle of her family life with the intent of transforming it into art. She especially focuses on her relationship with her Spanish mother, called the Doña, and her younger sister Concha. The result is a play, The Key, written by Teresa after the style of the Spanish autos sacramentales and set in Seville during the reign of Pedro the Cruel, the text of which is reproduced in its entirety within chapter eleven. The play parallels her relationship with her family. These include the characters Sister Pilar and Sister Assumption - who stand in for Teresa and Concha, especially in a pivotal scene where Sister Pilar confesses to Sister Assumption.

== Reception ==
The Observer wrote that "Miss Mirrlees' style is compact, forcible, and sometimes rarely beautiful." Meanwhile, The Guardian noted the novel's complexity, noting that "is not easy to read, but the reward of it is worth the effort." In a brief review of the work, The Nation compared Mirrlees' writing style for this novel to Walter Pater as well as Thomas Browne and Joris-Karl Huysmans. The book was notably praised by Raymond Mortimer in The New Statesman.

In a mixed review by The Courier-Journal, David Garnett praised the work for depictions of its family dynamics. However, Garnett opined that the work itself is badly written, writing that "Miss Mirrlees writes the most abominable sentences" and by citing the book's frequent use of unconnected imagery between its sentences.

== Influence and legacy ==
A French translation appeared in 1929 under the title Le Choc en Retour, tr. Simone Martin-Chauffier, published by Plon, Paris. An afterword by essayist Charles du Bos is also included in the French version.

In a diary entry dated 24 March 1955, writer Christopher Isherwood wrote that The Counterplot has "been one of the truly 'formative' books in my life", further writing that he knew "whole passages of it nearly by heart."
