= Julia Briggs =

British academic, literary critic and biographer (1943–2007)

Julia Briggs OBE
- Born: Julia Ruth Ballam; London, England
- Died: 16 August 2007 (aged 63)
- Education: South Hampstead High School; St Hilda's College, Oxford
- Occupations: Academic, literary critic and biographer
- Spouse(s): Peter Gold; Robin Briggs (m. 1969; div. 1989)

Julia Ruth Briggs (30 December 1943 – 16 August 2007) was an academic, literary critic and biographer who wrote about Virginia Woolf, children's literature and English Renaissance theatre. She taught at Hertford College, Oxford, and De Montfort University, Leicester.

== Early life and education ==
Julia Ruth Ballam was born in London on 30 December 1943, the daughter of Harry, who worked in advertising, and Gertrude (Trudi), who had trained as a commercial artist. She had a sister. The family was Sephardic Jewish. Harry had had literary ambitions and had published two anthologies. "The house was full of books, and family walks invariably paused by the Rossettis' grave."

Julia was educated at South Hampstead High School. The school did not think she was clever enough to attend Oxford, but both Girton College, Cambridge, and St Hilda's College, Oxford, offered her scholarships to read English. She accepted the place at St Hilda's. While there, she became pregnant, and said that she was the first student not to be sent down for this. Her scholarship was removed because of her pregnancy. She married her child's father, Peter Gold, and achieved a first-class degree.

Her postgraduate thesis, for the Bachelor of Letters (BLitt) degree, was on the English ghost story. Oxford did not consider that this subject was important enough for a doctorate.

== Career ==
Julia Briggs – as she was after her second marriage – became a tutor at Hertford College in 1978. She was the college's first woman fellow. She left Hertford in 1995, having been disappointed at not being appointed as a university lecturer. She became professor of literature and women's studies at De Montfort University, Leicester, and "flourished in the more egalitarian environment". She had said in 1992 that at Oxford "exams are designed and set by a male-structured course and a male-structured system of education".

Following her work on ghost stories, she wrote about English Renaissance theatre, about children's literature, and published biographies of E. Nesbit and Virginia Woolf. She showed "courage in espousing these often unfashionable areas of study". Her first book on ghost stories had been described as covering "subjects traditionally considered relatively trivial if not subliterary by a sizable number of unenlightened literary scholars". At Oxford, she promoted the study of women's writing. She was instrumental in ensuring that the Bodleian Library acquired the collection of Iona and Peter Opie in 1988.

Her role as general editor of the Penguin Books' edition of Virginia Woolf's work "required both scholarly expertise and deft interpersonal skills".

She published a critical edition of Paris: A Poem, by Hope Mirrlees, bringing it back to scholarly attention; after her death, Mirrlees's Collected Poems, edited by Sandeep Parmar (2011), was dedicated to her.

Briggs "was a nurturer of others, while insisting upon the highest standards of research", and enthusiastic about teaching mature students, a "supporter of the underdog", and had "an unusually vivid character for a scholar, combining beauty, grace and style with an exceptional interest in her students – and an ability to nurture their individual talents which made her a much-loved teacher".

Briggs was one of the founders of the British Shakespeare Association, and supported the Virginia Woolf Society of Great Britain. She was one of the founders of the digital Woolf resource, Woolf Online.

At Oxford, she was chair of the English faculty board, and of the examining board. She voted against Oxford offering an honorary doctorate to Margaret Thatcher.

== Critical reception ==
Children and Their Books: A Celebration of the Work of Iona and Peter Opie (1989), which she edited with Gillian Avery, was described as a "richly entertaining and, for the most part, scholarly and impressive collection of essays".

Her biography of Virginia Woolf "interweaves biographical and manuscriptural material with thematic concerns in a subtly groundbreaking biography which chooses to tell her life alongside close attention to the actual writing and to Woolf's accounts of writing". Lyndall Gordon writes that "Briggs outlines a work, then tunnels back to its biographical and manuscript origins ... An Inner Life comes into its own with women's social history and Woolf's polemical works". Victoria Glendinning described the book as "rarely less than lively and sensible ... likely to stimulate an appetite for her work in readers who have never yet come to grips with it".

== Honours ==
Briggs was appointed an OBE for services to English literature and education.

The Virginia Woolf Society of Great Britain set up an essay prize in her memory, held in 2009, 2011 and 2013.

The book Cultures of Childhood: Literary and Historical Studies in Memory of Julia Briggs (Museum Tusculanum Press, 2008), edited by Charles Lock, is dedicated to her.

== Personal life ==
Alison Light wrote: "Hers was an intense, loving nature and she seemed always to be entangled in a passionate love affair. ... Glamorous in her silk polo necks, high-heeled boots and Cossack hats, she was almost a grande dame, though quite unEnglish in her openly affectionate manner". Jane Marcus wrote that "everyone was in love with Julia Briggs. She was a radiant beauty and a brilliant critic". The journalist Sarah Crompton, a former student, said of her "She was a mother of three, a brilliant academic, and a wonderful teacher. She never pretended having all of that was easy, but she made it look possible and she took the time to help her students, particularly the girls, to feel it might be achievable too".

Her second husband was the historian Robin Briggs; they married in 1969, and divorced in 1989. She had one son with Gold, and two with Briggs. She lived in Oxford, and later in Brighton and at the Brunswick Centre in London.

She had breast cancer in 1999, and died of a brain tumour aged 63 in 2007.

== Books ==
- Night Visitors: The Rise and Fall of the English Ghost Story (Faber, 1977)
- This Stage Play World: English Literature and its Background, 1580–1625 (1983), revised in 1997 as This Stage Play World: Texts and Contexts 1580–1625 (Oxford University Press)
- She edited and completed Donald Crompton's book on William Golding, A View from the Spire: William Golding's Later Novels (Blackwell, 1985)
- A Woman of Passion: the life of E. Nesbit 1858–1924 (Hutchinson, 1987)
- Co-edited with Gillian Avery, Children and Their Books: a Celebration of the Work of Iona and Peter Opie (Oxford University Press, 1989)
- Virginia Woolf: introductions to the major works (Virago Press, 1994)
- Mayflower: The Voyage That Changed the World, as Julia Ballam, with her sister Anthea Ballam (O Books, 2003)
- Virginia Woolf: an Inner Life (Allen Lane, 2005)
- Reading Virginia Woolf (Edinburgh University Press, 2006)
- "Hope Mirrlees and Continental Modernism". In Scott, Bonnie Kime (ed.), Gender in Modernism: New Geographies, Complex Intersections, pp. 261–306. (University of Illinois Press, 2008)
- Popular Children's Literature in Britain, edited with Dennis Butts and M. O. Grenby (Ashgate, 2008)
