= Ishion Hutchinson =

Jamaican poet and essayist (born 1983)

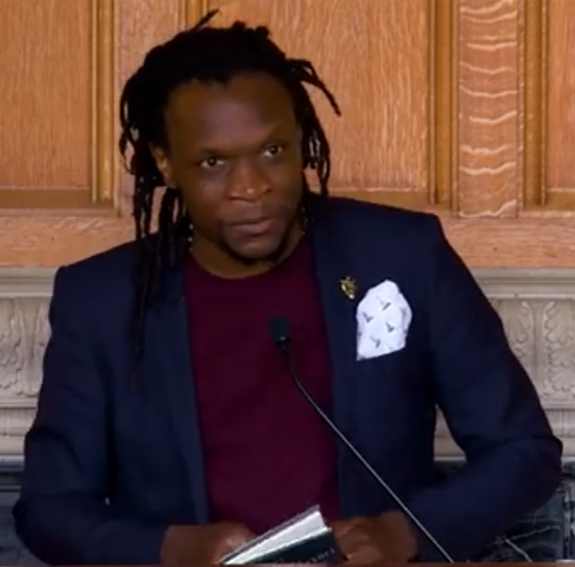
- At UC Berkeley's Lunch Poems in 2023
- Born: August 22, 1983 (age 43); Port Antonio, Jamaica
- Education: University of the West Indies; New York University; University of Utah
- Occupations: Poet; Professor

Ishion Hutchinson (born 22 August 1983) is a Jamaican poet and essayist.

== Biography ==
Hutchinson was born in Port Antonio, Jamaica. After attending Titchfield High School, he received a BA from the University of the West Indies, an MFA from New York University, and completed graduate studies at the University of Utah.

His poetry and essays have appeared in Ploughshares, The Poetry Review (UK), Narrative, New Letters, Granta, Gulf Coast, The New York Review of Books, The Huffington Post, The Wolf (UK), Prairie Schooner, Attica, Caribbean Review of Books, and the Los Angeles Review.

Hutchinson currently teaches courses in poetry and creative writing at Cornell University and serves as contributing editor to the literary journal Tongue: A Journal of Writing & Art.

== Awards and honors ==
His first collection, Far District, published by Peepal Tree Press (UK), won the 2011 PEN/Joyce Osterweil Award for Poetry. Hutchinson is also the recipient of the 2013 Whiting Award and the 2011 Academy of American Poets' Larry Levis Prize. His 2016 collection, House of Lords and Commons, won the National Book Critics Circle Award for poetry. He won a 2019 Windham–Campbell Literature Prize in Poetry. His 2023 collection, School of Instructions, was a finalist for the Griffin Poetry Prize.

== Bibliography ==
=== Poetry ===
Collections

- Far District. Peepal Tree Press. 2010. ISBN 9781845231576.
- House of Lords and Commons. Macmillan. 2016. ISBN 9780374173029.
- School of Instructions: A Poem. Farrar, Straus and Giroux. 2023. ISBN 9780374610265.

List of poems

Title	Year	First published	Reprinted/collected
The old professor's book	2018	"The old professor's book". The New Yorker. Vol. 94, no. 28. 17 September 2018. p. 37.	
