= Barbara Wootton, Baroness Wootton of Abinger =

British sociologist and criminologist (1897–1988)

The Right Honourable The Baroness Wootton of Abinger CH

Member of the House of Lords Lord Temporal
- In office 8 August 1958 – 11 July 1988; Life peerage

Personal details
- Born: Barbara Adam; 14 April 1897 Cambridge, England
- Died: 11 July 1988 (aged 91) Surrey, England
- Occupation: Sociologist and criminologist

Barbara Frances Wootton, Baroness Wootton of Abinger (14 April 1897 – 11 July 1988), was a British sociologist and criminologist. She was the first of four women to be appointed a life peer, entitled to sit in the House of Lords under the Life Peerages Act 1958, after the names of the holders of the first 14 life peerages to be created had been announced on 24 July. She was governor of the BBC from 1950 to 1956 and president of the British Sociological Association from 1959 to 1964.

== Early life ==
Wootton was born Barbara Adam on 14 April 1897 in Cambridge, England. She had two older brothers. Her father, James Adam (1860–1907), was a classicist and tutor at Emmanuel College, Cambridge; her mother, Adele Marion, was a fellow of Girton College, Cambridge.

Wootton was educated at the Perse School for Girls. She studied classics and economics at Girton College, Cambridge, from 1915 to 1919, winning the Agnata Butler Prize in 1917. Wootton gained a first class in her final exams, but as a woman she was prevented from appending BA to her name.

== Professional life ==
=== Inter-war period ===
On leaving Cambridge Wootton moved to the London School of Economics to take up a research studentship. In 1920 she took up a fellowship at Girton College. She was appointed Director of Studies and Lecturer in Economics at the college. During this time the board of economics invited her to lecture on economics and the state. She left Girton to take up a post as a research officer at the Trades Union Congress jointly with the Labour Party Research Department. In 1924 she was appointed to the Treasury committee by the first Labour Chancellor of the Exchequer, Phillip Snowden. She worked for the next four years on workers educational issues, such as adult literacy. From 1926 she was principal of Morley College for Working Men and Women in the Yorkshire clothier districts. The following year she returned to London to a promotion as Director of Studies for Tutorials at the University of London. In the 1930s Wootton was a member of the Federal Union and represented the Union in a historic debate against Edgar Hardcastle of the Socialist Party of Great Britain, which was later published as a pamphlet. She served on the Royal Commission investigating workmen's compensation schemes (1938–44).

=== Second World War ===
During the Second World War Wootton considered herself to be a conscientious objector, although she was never liable for military service. She was, however, required, under the Registration for Employment Order 1941, to be interviewed in 1943 by a National Service Officer of the Ministry of Labour and National Service, who deemed her service as an unpaid magistrate to be of sufficient value as not to require direction to any employment. With her agreement, her husband, George Wright, registered as a conscientious objector in 1941, and did farm work and later civil defence work.

=== Post-war ===
Wootton served as a chairman of juvenile court magistrates in London for nearly 20 years (1946–1962), and as a lay magistrate (1926–1970).

In 1948 she became Professor of Social Studies at the University of London. In 1952 she transferred within the university to take up a Nuffield Research Fellowship at Bedford College. She did extensive research into the pathological effects of social research and their economic benefits; the findings were published in Wootton's Social Science and Social Pathology in 1959.

Wootton was governor of the British Broadcasting Corporation (BBC) from 1950 to 1956. She also served on two major post-war Royal Commissions on the press and civil service. In 1968 she was awarded an honorary degree (Doctor of Science) by the University of Bath. In 1969 she was made an honorary fellow of Girton College. In 1977 she was made a member of the Order of the Companions of Honour (CH). In 1985 she was awarded an honorary doctorate by the University of Cambridge. In 1984 she was chosen as one of six women for the BBC 2 series Women of Our Century.

She was created a life peer on 8 August 1958 with the title Baroness Wootton of Abinger, of Abinger Common in the County of Surrey, on the advice of Harold Macmillan and was thereby one of the first women to sit in the House of Lords; she also became the first woman to sit on the Woolsack as a Deputy Speaker. She was the chairperson of the Wootton Report concerning cannabis. She also supported the Sexual Offences Act 1967, which decriminalised sex between men over 21. She was the first chairman of the Countryside Commission.

In 1960 she wrote an article for the New Statesman on women's social position in Britain, reviewing and commenting on Joan Barnes's pamphlet "A Woman's Place: Wider Horizons". Wootton observed that "[much] indeed has been accomplished. In nearly every sphere of public activity the sex which constitutes the majority of the population is now at least a visible minority. But almost always a minority ... Contemporary discriminations are of a subtler order – and for that reason more difficult to deal with." She conceded that "[mathematical] equality of the sexes in public and professional life cannot, of course, be expected", but proposed that men and women share more domestic responsibilities: "Here then is where the next revolution is needed ... [in] all social classes the role of fathers ... no longer ends with wiping up. In more and more homes father at least occasionally baths the children or takes them out on Saturdays or Sundays ... I can see no reason why we should not travel much further along this road – almost, if not quite, as far as the point at which everything that can be shared is shared." Although such a change would necessitate "great reorganisations ... in working hours and arrangements in the industrial and professional worlds ... greater social changes than this have happened before." This hope for (nearly) equal sharing of domestic labour is still unrealised in Britain nearly 60 years later.

Ethically, she was a supporter of utilitarianism. She supported the Incurable Patients Bill in the 1970s which would have allowed doctor-assisted suicide. Her anti-abortion views had no religious basis but led her to be removed from her position as vice-president of the British Humanist Association.

Brian Harrison recorded an oral history interview with Wootton as part of the Suffrage Interviews project, titled Oral evidence on the suffragette and suffragist movements: the Brian Harrison interviews.. In it she recalls the influence of her mother, discusses Eva Hubback, who succeeded her at Morley College, and talks about her political career.

== Publications ==
Wootton wrote several books on economic and sociological subjects, including Lament for Economics (1938), End Social Inequality (1941), Freedom Under Planning (1945), Social Science and Social Pathology (1959), Crime and the Criminal Law (1964) and Incomes Policy (1974).

In Crime and the Criminal Law she controversially advocated that all crimes ought to be crimes of strict liability (see Elliott, C. & Quinn, F. 2010. Criminal Law. 8th ed. Essex: Pearson Education Ltd). In other words, it was her contention that mens rea – the 'guilty mind' – should not be taken into account. This would remove the burden from the prosecution of proving intent or recklessness.

She also wrote a book of autobiographical reflections, In a World I Never Made (1967).

== Personal life ==
One of her brothers, Captain Arthur Innes Adam, was killed in France on 16 September 1916. Another brother, Neil Kensington Adam, became a noted chemist.

In 1917 she married John "Jack" Wootton. They had thirty-six hours together before she saw him off to France. He was wounded during the First World War and died weeks after their wedding.

In 1935 Wootton married George Wright, a colleague in adult education and London government. Despite Wright's infidelity, they remained married until his death from cancer in 1964. They had no children.

Wootton died in a care home in Surrey on 11 July 1988, aged 91.

== Notes ==
Academic offices
Preceded by Morris Ginsberg	President of the British Sociological Association; 1959–1964	Succeeded by T. H. Marshall
Honorary titles
Preceded by The Lord Taylor	Senior life peer February–July 1988	Succeeded by The Lord Shackleton
