= Alpha and Omega (Harrison book) =

1915 collection of essays

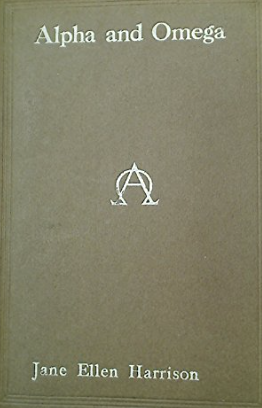
- Title page for Alpha and Omega (1915)
- Author: Jane Ellen Harrison
- Publisher: Harrison
- Publication date: 1915

Alpha and Omega (1915) is a collection of essays, lectures, and letters written by Jane Ellen Harrison and published for Harrison during the outbreak of World War I.

== Contents ==
- Crabbed Age and Youth — read to Trinity College
- Heresy and Humanity (1912) — published by the Cambridge Society of Heretics
- Unanimism and Conversion — published by the Cambridge Society of Heretics
- "Homo Sum" — letter to an anti-suffragist
- Scientiae Sacra Fames — read before the London Sociological Society
- The Influence of Darwinism on the Study of Religions — or "The Creation of Darwinism of the Scientific Study of Religions." (143)
- Alpha and Omega — read to Trinity College; "if we are to keep our hold on Religion, theology must go." (179)
- Art and Mr. Clive Bell — response to Art by Clive Bell (1914)
- Epilogue on the War: Peace and Patriotism

== Purpose ==
In Alpha and Omega's preface, Harrison explains why she published such various topics, ranging from magic to post-Impressionism, in one work. She says, "Seen in the fierce glare of war, these theories -- academic in origin and interest -- ... seemed like faded photographs." (v-vi) World War I had brought a melancholy to Harrison's life because pacifist leanings, as admitted in the Epilogue, isolated her.
