= James Adam (classicist) =

Scottish classicist (1860–1907)

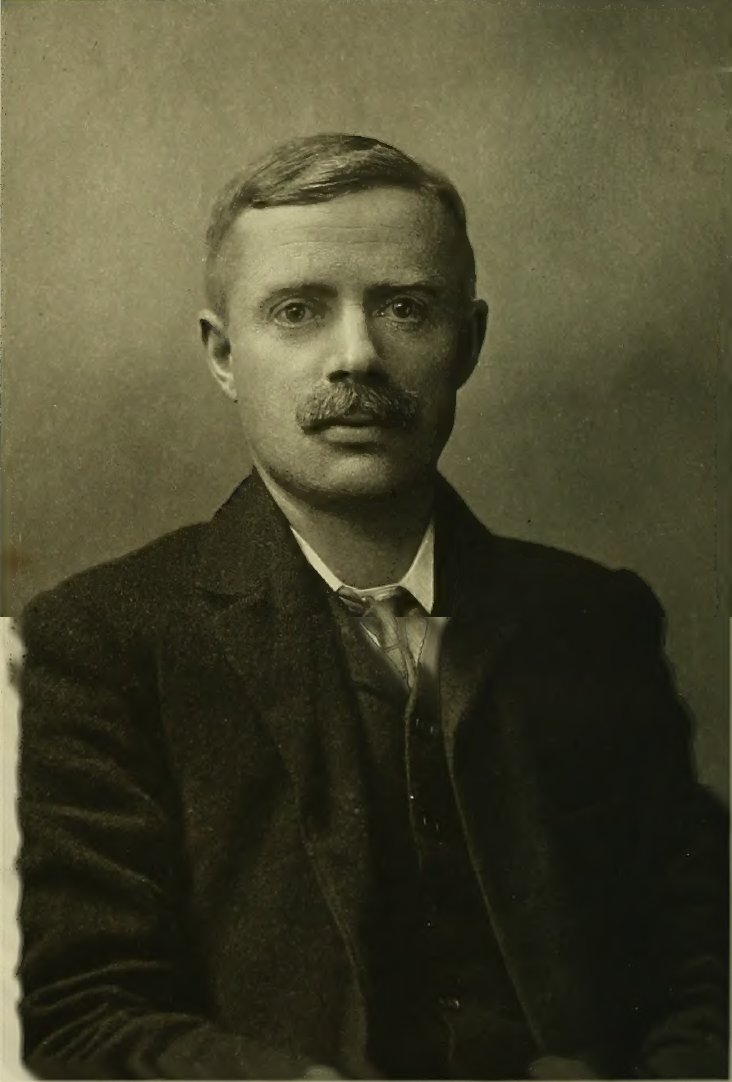
- James Adam
- Born: 7 April 1860; Kinmuck, Keithhall, Aberdeen, Scotland
- Died: 30 August 1907 (aged 47); Aberdeen, Scotland
- Education: University of Aberdeen; Gonville and Caius College, Cambridge; Emmanuel College, Cambridge
- Occupation: Academic
- Spouse: Adela Marion Adam (née Kensington)
- Children: 3, Barbara, Arthur, Neil
- Writing career
- Notable work: Platonis Crito; The Republic of Plato; The Religious Teachers of Greece

James Adam (7 April 1860 – 30 August 1907) was a Scottish classicist who taught classics at Emmanuel College, Cambridge.

== Life ==
James Adam was born on 7 April 1860 in Kinmuck in the parish of Keithhall near Inverurie, Aberdeenshire. He was the second son of James Adam, a shopkeeper and former farm servant, and of Adam's wife Barbara (née Anderson), a farmer's daughter. The younger James was educated at the Old Grammar School in Old Aberdeen, at the University of Aberdeen where he studied under William Geddes and gained his B.A. as Senior Classic in 1880. He subsequently moved to Gonville and Caius College, Cambridge in the same year, receiving his Cambridge B.A. in 1884.

In 1884 Adam was appointed Junior Fellow and soon thereafter Senior Lecturer in the Classics at Emmanuel College. He began lecturing on Greek poetry and philosophy in December 1884. He was awarded his M.A. by Emmanuel in 1888, and his Litt. D. in 1903. He later became Senior Tutor at the college; he moved into the Senior Tutor's house in 1900.

One of Adam's duties at Cambridge was to teach the students of Girton College, which was then open only to women. In 1890, a former Girton student of his, Adela Marion (née Kensington) (1866–1944), became his wife and lifelong collaborator. Their daughter, Barbara Frances (1897–1988), was the British sociologist and criminologist Lady Barbara Wootton; one of their sons, Captain Arthur Innes Adam, was killed in France on 16 September 1916; and another son, Neil Kensington Adam, became a noted chemist.

Adam was "one of the greatest Platonists of his generation". His editions and commentaries on Plato's Apology, Crito, Euthyphro, Protagoras, and the Republic are widely respected:

[His] two-volume critical edition of the Republic was another major contribution to the field. Though his preface claims 'an editor cannot pretend to have exhausted its significance by means of a commentary,' Adam's depth of knowledge and erudite analysis of the Greek text ensured that his edition remained the standard reference for decades to follow, and it remains a thought-provoking evaluation of one of the great works of Western thought.

He was "a resolute opponent of all attempts to make Greek an optional study". He was also a "keen supporter of the claims of women to degrees, when the question came before the senate of the university in 1897"

In 1904 and 1905 Adam delivered the Gifford Lectures at Aberdeen, choosing for his subject "The Religious Teachers of Greece".

He died in Aberdeen on 30 August 1907.

== Editions and commentaries on Plato ==
- Platonis Apologia Socratis. Cambridge University Press, 1887. New edition, 1891.
- Platonis Crito. Cambridge University Press, 1888. 2nd edition, 1893.
- Platonis Euthyphro. Cambridge University Press, 1890.
- Platonis Protagoras. Cambridge University Press, 1893 with Adela Marion Adam.
- The Republic of Plato. Cambridge University Press, 1897. Republic of Plato, Books I–V. 1902. Republic of Plato, Books VI–X and indices. 1902. 2nd edition edited by D. A. Rees, 1965.

== Other writings ==
- The Nuptial Number of Plato: its Solution and Significance. 1891.
- The Intellectual and Ethical Value of Classical Education. Cambridge, 1895.
- The Religious Teachers of Greece: Being Gifford Lectures on Natural Religion Delivered at Aberdeen. Edinburgh: T. and T. Clark, 1908. Edited, with a memoir, by Adela Marion Adam from the Gifford Lectures delivered in 1904–06.
- The Vitality of Platonism, and Other Essays. Edited and published by A.M. Adam in 1911.
