= Cambridge Ritualists =

Recognised group of classical scholars

The Cambridge Ritualists were a recognised group of classical scholars, mostly in Cambridge, England, including Jane Ellen Harrison, F. M. Cornford, Gilbert Murray (actually from the University of Oxford), A. B. Cook, George Thomson, and others. They earned this title because of their shared interest in ritual, specifically their attempts to explain myth and early forms of classical drama as originating in ritual. They are also sometimes referred to as the myth and ritual school or the Classical Anthropologists.

They were heavily inspired by James George Frazer's The Golden Bough; in 1913, Murray proclaimed Frazer's conception of the ritual killing of the sacred king as the "orthodox view of the origins of tragedy. The year Daimon waxes proud and is slain by his enemy, who becomes thereby a murderer, and must in turn perish". A decade later, however, the excessively rigid application of Frazer's thesis to Greek tragedy had already begun to be challenged, and by the sixties Robert Fagles could state that "The ritual origins of tragedy are totally in doubt, often hotly debated".

== Influences ==
Through their work in classical philology, they exerted profound influence not only on the Classics, but on literary critics such as Stanley Edgar Hyman and Northrop Frye.

They were also influenced by other scholars besides Frazer. Particularly affected by Émile Durkheim was Cornford, who used the French sociologist's notion of collective representations to analyze social forms of religious, artistic, philosophical, and scientific expression in classical Greece. Other significant influences on the group, particularly on Harrison, were Charles Darwin, Karl Marx, Friedrich Nietzsche and Sigmund Freud.

== See also ==
- Jessie Weston
- Life-death-rebirth deity
- Myth and ritual
- Sir Michael Tippett
- Sparagmos
- The White Goddess
