= James Byrne (poet) =

British poet and translator

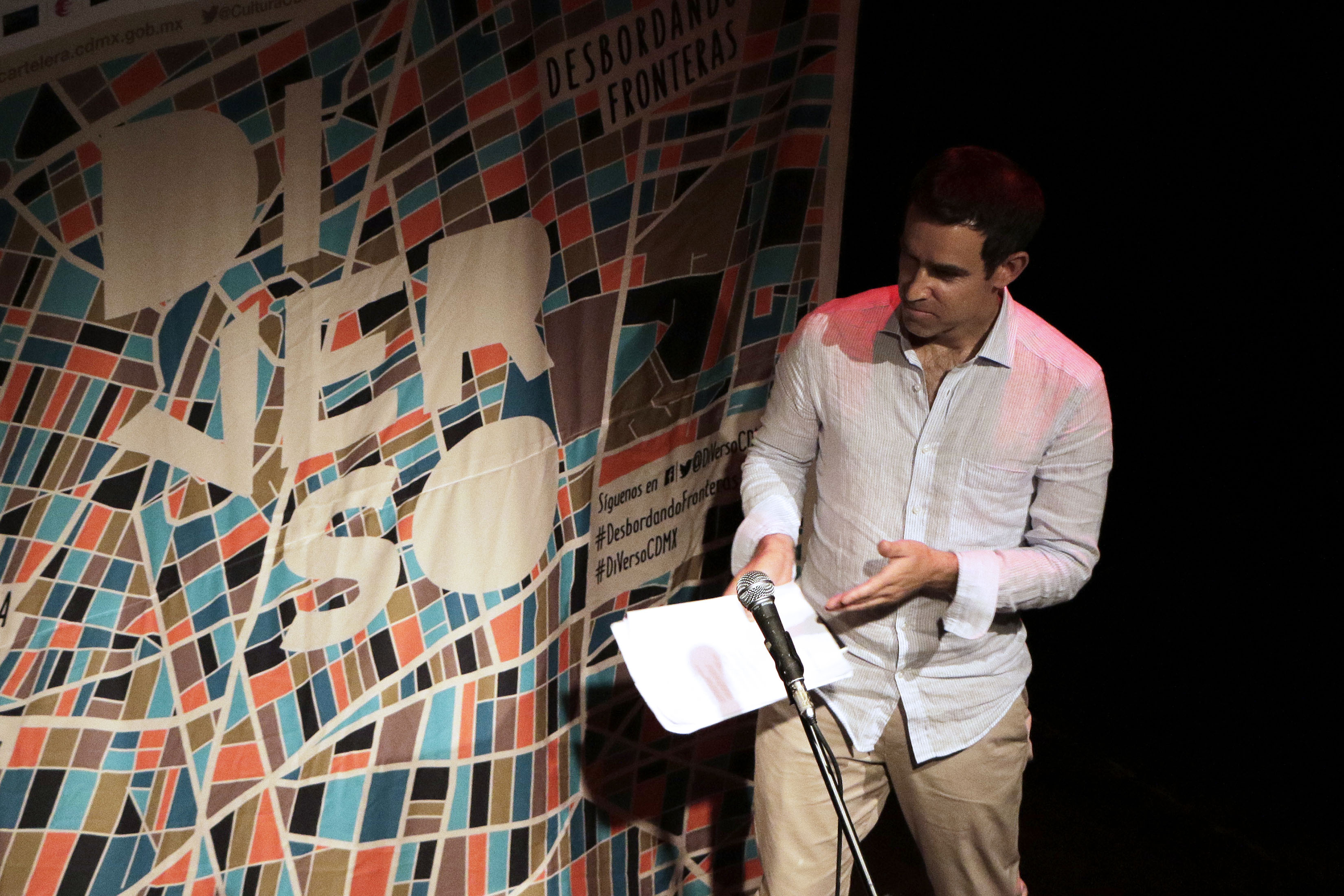
James Byrne on a poetry reading in Mexico City.

James Byrne is a British poet and translator who edited The Wolf magazine from 2002 to 2017. He was born in Buckinghamshire in 1977. His most recent poetry collections include Everything Broken Up Dances, published by Tupelo Press in the United States and White Coins, both in 2015. Other published collections include Blood/Sugar by Arc Publications in 2009, and he has also published pamphlets, including SOAPBOXES and Myth of the Savage Tribes, Myth of Civilised Nations, a collaborative work with the poet Sandeep Parmar. For many years James has been consistently talked of as 'one of the leading poets of his generation', endorsed by The Times as one of the 'ten rising stars of British poetry' in April 2009. He lives in England after two years in New York City, where he received a Stein scholarship and an MFA from New York University. He was the poet in residence at Clare Hall, University of Cambridge, from 2011 to 2012 and is a senior lecturer at Edge Hill University, where he teaches poetry and poetics.

In 2008, Byrne won the Treci Trg poetry festival prize in Serbia. In 2009 his New and Selected Poems: The Vanishing House was published by Treci Trg (in a bilingual edition) in Belgrade. He is the editor of The Wolf: A Decade (Poems 2002-2012) and is the co-editor of Voice Recognition: 21 Poets for the 21st Century, an anthology of British poets, under 35, published by Bloodaxe in 2009. As sole editor of The Wolf from April 2006, James broadened the international reach of the magazine and this has affected some of his editorial work. In June 2012, Bones Will Crow: 15 Contemporary Burmese Poets was co-edited and co-translated by James Byrne and Ko Ko Thett and is widely recognised as the first anthology of contemporary Burmese poetry available in the West. Atlantic Drift: An Anthology of Poetry and Poetics was co-edited by Byrne and Robert Sheppard in 2017, publishing leading innovative poets from the UK and North America.

Byrne's own poems have been translated into several languages, including Arabic, Burmese, Chinese, Slovenian, Spanish, Serbian and French. In 2009 he was invited by the British Council in Damascus to participate in the Al-Sendian arts festival in Syria. In 2012 he read his work at the inaugural Tripoli Poetry Festival in Libya and in 2013 he opened the Irrawaddy Literature Festival in Yangon, Burma. His work has been recommended by the Poetry Book Society (SOAPBOXES) and he won Tupelo's July Open Reading Competition in 2013 in the U.S. making him one of the first poets of his generation with a developed transatlantic profile.

Of Everything Broken Up Dances the American poet and translator Forrest Gander said: "Reading James Byrne is like gulping firewater shots of the world. The variety of poetic forms and lineations— in couplets, prose poems, anaphoric lists, singular lyrics, and sequences— acts out the author’s insistent concern for diversity, for internationality. The extraordinary and deftly employed lexicon derives from everywhere."

The poet John Kinsella wrote on the jacket for Blood/Sugar: ‘James Byrne is a phenomenon and Blood/Sugar is astonishing. Byrne has a razor-sharp wit, an acute intellect and a superb facility with language. The poetry he writes is both culturally and intellectually ‘learned’, but also rhetorically and lyrically confident. He is a complete original.’
