= Alfred Kensington =

English judge

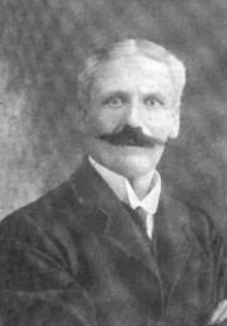
- Born: 26 May 1855; Jersey
- Died: 2 November 1918 (aged 1855); London, England
- Education: Marlborough College; University College, Oxford
- Occupation: Judge

Sir Alfred Kensington (26 May 1855 - 2 November 1918) was a civil servant and judge in British India. He served as the Chief Justice of the Chief Court of the Punjab.

== Biography ==
He was born in Jersey and educated at Marlborough College and University College, Oxford. He joined the Indian Civil Service as an Assistant Commissioner in the Punjab in 1878.

He served as Assistant Settlement officer until 1883, and was on special duty in Ambala in 1880. He was Under Secretary to the Government of India in 1890 before returning to the Punjab as Deputy Commissioner in 1894. He was made a Divisional Judge in 1896, and was transferred to the North West Provinces as Accountant General for a brief period that same year. In 1905, he was made a full time Judge in the Chief Court of the Punjab based at Lahore and between 1914 and 1915 served as the Chief Justice, after he was knighted.

Sir Alfred died at his home in London in 1918. His nephew was the chemist Neil Kensington Adam.
