= Robin Briggs =

English historian

Robin Briggs FRSL FRHistS FBA
- Born: 26 May 1942 (age 84); Braintree, Essex, England
- Occupations: Historian and academic
- Spouse(s): Julia Briggs (m. 1969; div. 1989); Daphne Nash
- Children: 3

Academic background
- Education: Balliol College, Oxford

Academic work
- Discipline: History
- Sub-discipline: Early modern France; Witchcraft
- Institutions: All Souls College, Oxford
- Doctoral students: Suzannah Lipscomb

Robin Briggs (born 26 May 1942) is an English historian who has spent his entire academic career at All Souls College, Oxford.

== Early life and education ==
Born in Braintree to Donald Frederick and Kathleen Ann Briggs, he went up to Balliol College, Oxford, in 1961 and graduated with a first-class modern history Bachelor of Arts degree in 1964.

== Academic career ==
He was appointed a fellow of All Souls College, Oxford, that year, after passing its examination; he was then appointed a junior research fellow there in 1971 and then senior research fellow seven years later. Briggs remained in that post until retiring and being appointed an emeritus fellow at All Souls in 2009. From 1976 to 2009, he also lectured for the University of Oxford, and was junior proctor in the 1972–73 year.

His research interests include the history of witchcraft in Europe and other aspects of early modern European history (especially politics, society and religion, and the history of early modern France and the French Catholic Church).

== Honours ==
Briggs was elected a Fellow of the Royal Historical Society in 1969, a Fellow of the Royal Society of Literature in 1999 and a Fellow of the British Academy in 2009 (the last being the United Kingdom's national academy for the humanities and social sciences).

== Personal life ==
Briggs had two sons and a step-son with his first wife, Julia Briggs. He later married the archaeologist Daphne Nash.

== Selected publications ==
- The Witches of Lorraine (Oxford University Press, 2007).
- Witches and Neighbours: The Social and Cultural Context of European Witchcraft (Harper Collins, 1996).
- "The Académie Royale des Sciences and the pursuit of utility", Past and Present, vol. 131 (1991), pp. 38–88.
- Communities of Belief: Social and Cultural Tensions in Early Modern France (Oxford University Press, 1989).
- Early Modern France, 1560–1715 (Oxford University Press, 1977).
