= Hope Mirrlees =

British poet, novelist, and translator (1887–1978)

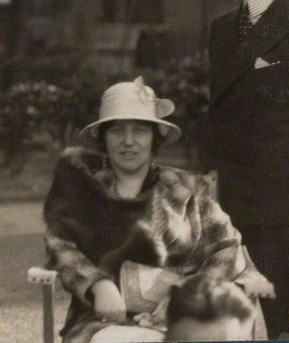
- Hope Mirrlees in 1931
- Born: Helen Hope Mirrlees; 8 April 1887; Chislehurst, Kent
- Died: 1 August 1978 (aged 91); Thames Bank, Goring, Oxfordshire
- Education: Royal Academy of Dramatic Art; Newnham College, Cambridge
- Writing career
- Notable works: Paris: A Poem (1920); Lud-in-the-Mist (1926)
- Literary movement: Literary modernism

(Helen) Hope Mirrlees (8 April 1887 – 1 August 1978) was a British poet, novelist and translator. She is best known for the 1926 Lud-in-the-Mist, an influential fantasy novel, and for Paris: A Poem (1920), an experimental poem published by Virginia and Leonard Woolf's Hogarth Press, which critic Julia Briggs deemed "modernism's lost masterpiece, a work of extraordinary energy and intensity, scope and ambition."

== Biography ==
Helen Hope Mirrlees was born in Chislehurst, Kent, and raised in Scotland and South Africa. She attended the Royal Academy of Dramatic Art before going up to Newnham College, Cambridge to study Greek. While at Cambridge, Mirrlees developed a close relationship with the classicist Jane Ellen Harrison, Mirrlees' tutor and later her friend and collaborator.

Mirrlees and Harrison lived together from 1913 until the latter's death in 1928. Although they divided their time mainly between the United Kingdom and France, often returning to Paris to continue Harrison's medical treatments, their travels also took them to other European countries. Both of them studied Russian; Mirrlees earned a Diploma in Russian from the École des Langues Orientales of Paris, and went on to collaborate on translations from the Russian. Mirrlees and Harrison visited Spain in 1920, and there took Spanish lessons.

After Harrison's death, Mirrlees converted to Catholicism. In 1948, Mirrlees moved to South Africa and remained there until 1963, when the first volume of her "extravagant biography" of Sir Robert Bruce Cotton was published (the second volume is unpublished). Two volumes of poetry, Poems and Moods and Tensions, were also privately published.

Mirrlees was a friend of Virginia Woolf, who described her in a letter as "her own heroine – capricious, exacting, exquisite, very learned, and beautifully dressed." Her circle of celebrity friends also included T. S. Eliot, Bertrand Russell, Ottoline Morrell, and Gertrude Stein, who mentions Mirrlees in Everybody's Autobiography and in The Autobiography of Alice B. Toklas, in which she refers to Jane Ellen Harrison as Mirrlees' "pet project," and comments, "Miss Harrison and Gertrude Sten did not particularly interest each other."

Mirrlees died in Thames Bank, Goring, England, in 1978, aged 91.

== Writing ==
Mirrlees' 600-line modernist poem, Paris: A Poem, published in 1920 by Leonard and Virginia Woolf's Hogarth Press, is the subject of increasing attention by scholars of modernism, inspired by Julia Briggs's considerable study, and is considered by some to have had an influence on the work of her friend, T. S. Eliot, and on that of Virginia Woolf.

Mirrlees set her first novel, Madeleine: One of Love's Jansenists (1919), in and around the literary circles of the 17th Century Précieuses, and particularly those salons frequented by Madeleine de Scudéry. Virginia Woolf remarked both in public and private that she could not get 'an ounce of joy' from the novel and gave it an ambivalent review in The Times Literary Supplement, but helped Mirrlees find a publisher for it and later wrote that she regretted judging it so harshly. Mirrlees later used medieval Spanish culture as part of the background of her second novel, The Counterplot (1924).

Without the author's knowledge, Lud-in-the-Mist was reprinted in 1970 in mass-market paperback format as part of the Ballantine Adult Fantasy series edited by Lin Carter, and then again by Del Rey in 1977. The book had fallen into the public domain in the United States as the copyright had not been renewed in 1954 or 1955, which was the statute at the time. In his introduction, Carter wrote that he and the publishing company could not even ascertain whether the author was alive or dead, "since our efforts to trace this lady [Mirrlees] have so far been unsuccessful."

Since 2000, Mirrlees' work has undergone another resurgence in popularity, marked by new editions of her poetry, an entry in the Dictionary of National Biography and several scholarly essays by critic Julia Briggs, new introductions to Lud-in-the-Mist by writer Neil Gaiman and scholar Douglas A. Anderson, essays and a brief biography by writer Michael Swanwick, an artist-book facsimile reprint of Paris, a poem by printer and publisher Hurst Street Press, and translations of Lud-in-the-Mist into German and Spanish.

Joanna Russ wrote a short story, The Zanzibar Cat (1971), in homage to Hope Mirrlees and as a critique of Lud-in-the-Mist and as a commentary on fantasy writing more generally, describing Fairyland "half in affectionate parody, but the other half very seriously indeed".

Hope-in-the-Mist, a book-length study of Mirrlees and her work by Michael Swanwick, was published by Temporary Culture in 2009.

The Collected Poems of Hope Mirrlees was published by Fyfield Books (Carcanet Press) in 2011 (edited by Sandeep Parmar). It includes previously unpublished poems, the full text of Paris, her later poems and prose essays from the 1920s. Sandeep Parmar is currently writing a biography of Mirrlees as well. She also features in the group biography Square Haunting by Francesca Wade (2020), in the biographical section on Jane Ellen Harrison.

== Bibliography ==
=== Fiction ===
- Madeleine: One of Love's Jansenists, W. Collins Sons & Co. Ltd (1919)
- The Counterplot, W. Collins Sons & Co. Ltd (1924)
- Lud-in-the-Mist, W. Collins Sons & Co. Ltd (1926)

=== Poetry ===
- Paris: A Poem, Hogarth Press (1919)
- Poems, Cape Town, Gothic (1963)
- Moods and Tensions: Poems (1976)
- "Collected Poems of Hope Mirrlees" (2011), edited by Sandeep Parmar
- Paris: A Poem, Hurst Street Press (2017)

=== Non-fiction ===
- "Quelques aspects de l’art d'Alexis Mikhailovich Remizov", in Le Journal de Psychologie Normale et Pathologique, 15 January – 15 March (1926)
- "Listening in to the Past", in The Nation & Athenaeum, 11 September (1926)
- "The Religion of Women", in The Nation & Athenaeum, 28 May (1927)
- "Gothic Dreams", in The Nation & Athenaeum, 3 March (1928)
- "Bedside Books", in Life and Letters, December (1928)
- A Fly in Amber: Being an Extravagant Biography of the Romantic Antiquary Sir Robert Bruce Cotton (1962)

== Translations by Hope Mirrlees ==
- The life of the Archpriest Avvakum by Himself (1924) with Jane Ellen Harrison
- The Book of the Bear: Being Twenty-one Tales newly translated from the Russian (1926) with Jane Harrison, the pictures by Ray Garnett

== Translations ==
- Le choc en retour (1929), translation by Simone Martin-Chauffier ("The Counterplot")
- Flucht ins Feenland (2003), transl. by Hannes Riffel ("Lud-in-the-Mist")
- Entrebrumas (2005) ("Lud-in-the-Mist")
- Lud-en-Brume (2015), transl. by Julie Pettonnet-Vincent ("Lud-in-the-Mist")
- פריז - Paris: A Poem (2016) Hebrew transl. by Yehuda Vizan

== Distinctions ==
For its first publication in french in 2015, the translation of Lud-in-the-Mist received the 2016 Elbakin Prize for Best Foreign Novel (meilleur roman étranger).
