= Adela Marion Adam =

English classicist (1866–1944)

- Born: Adela Marion Kensington; 10 June 1866; London, England
- Died: 12 August 1944 (aged 78); Cambridge, England
- Education: Girton College
- Occupation: Academic
- Spouse: James Adam

Adela Marion Adam (10 June 1866 – 12 August 1944) was an English classicist, editor and Fellow of Girton College.

== Career ==
Adela Marion Adam taught Classics intermittently at Girton College and at Newnham College from c.1890 to at least 1920. She also returned to her former school, Bedford College in London, to teach twice a week after the death of her husband in 1907. During the First World War she delivered Classics lectures on behalf of the University of Cambridge. She was a Research Fellow at Girton from 1920–3. In 1912 she became Treasurer at Girton of the Frances Buss Fund, designed to help poorer students.

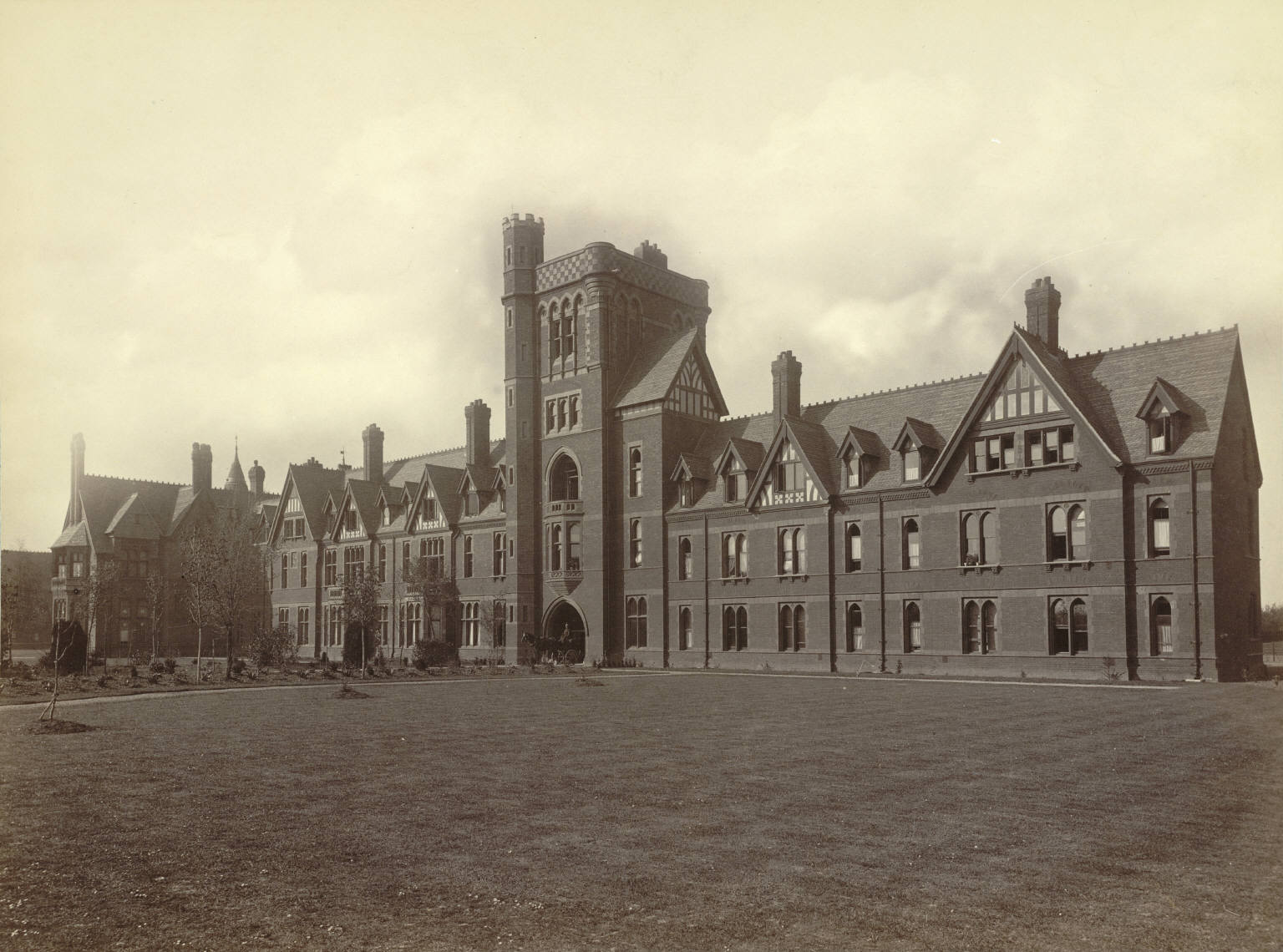
Girton College, 1910s

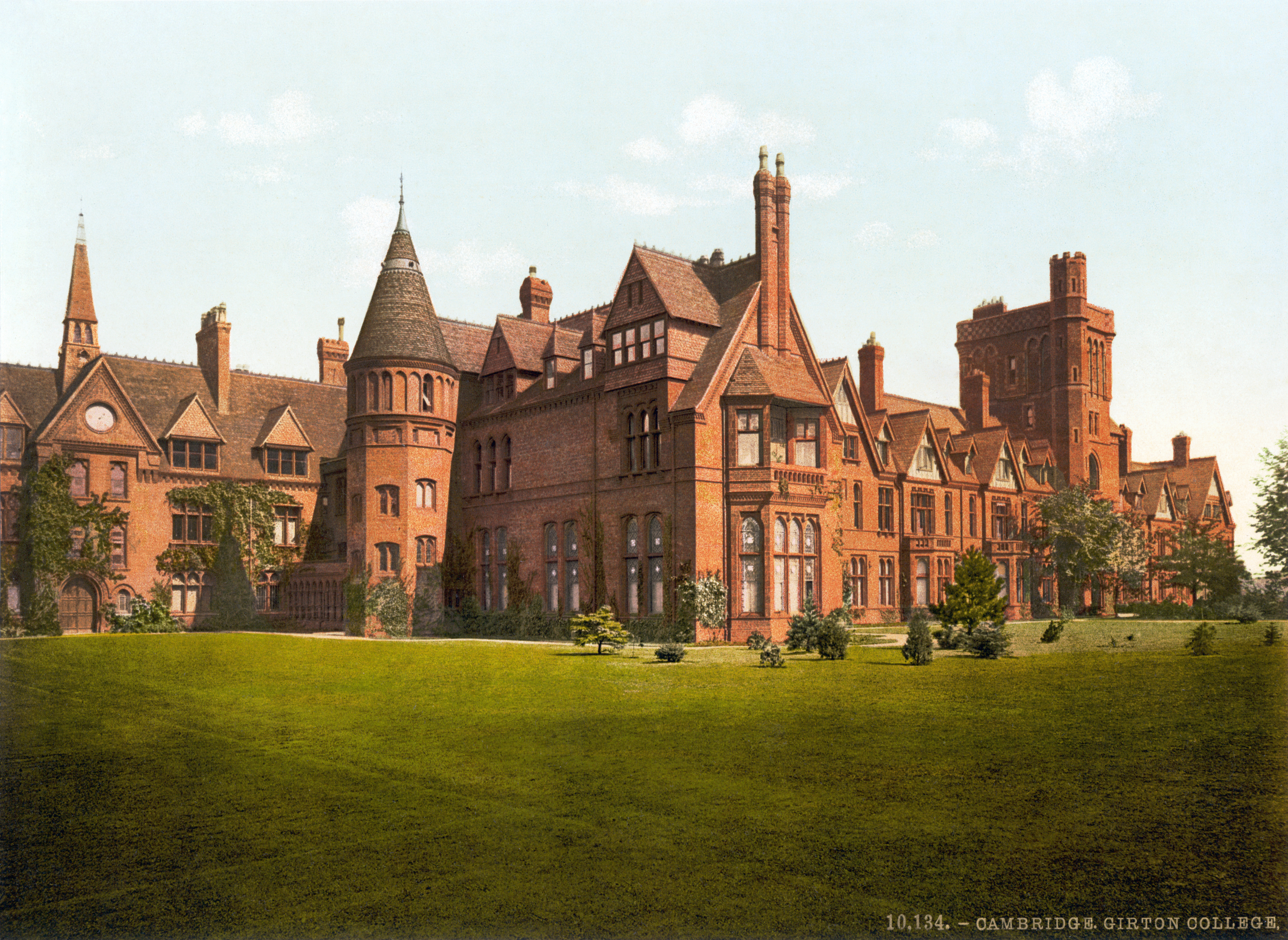
Girton College, 1910s

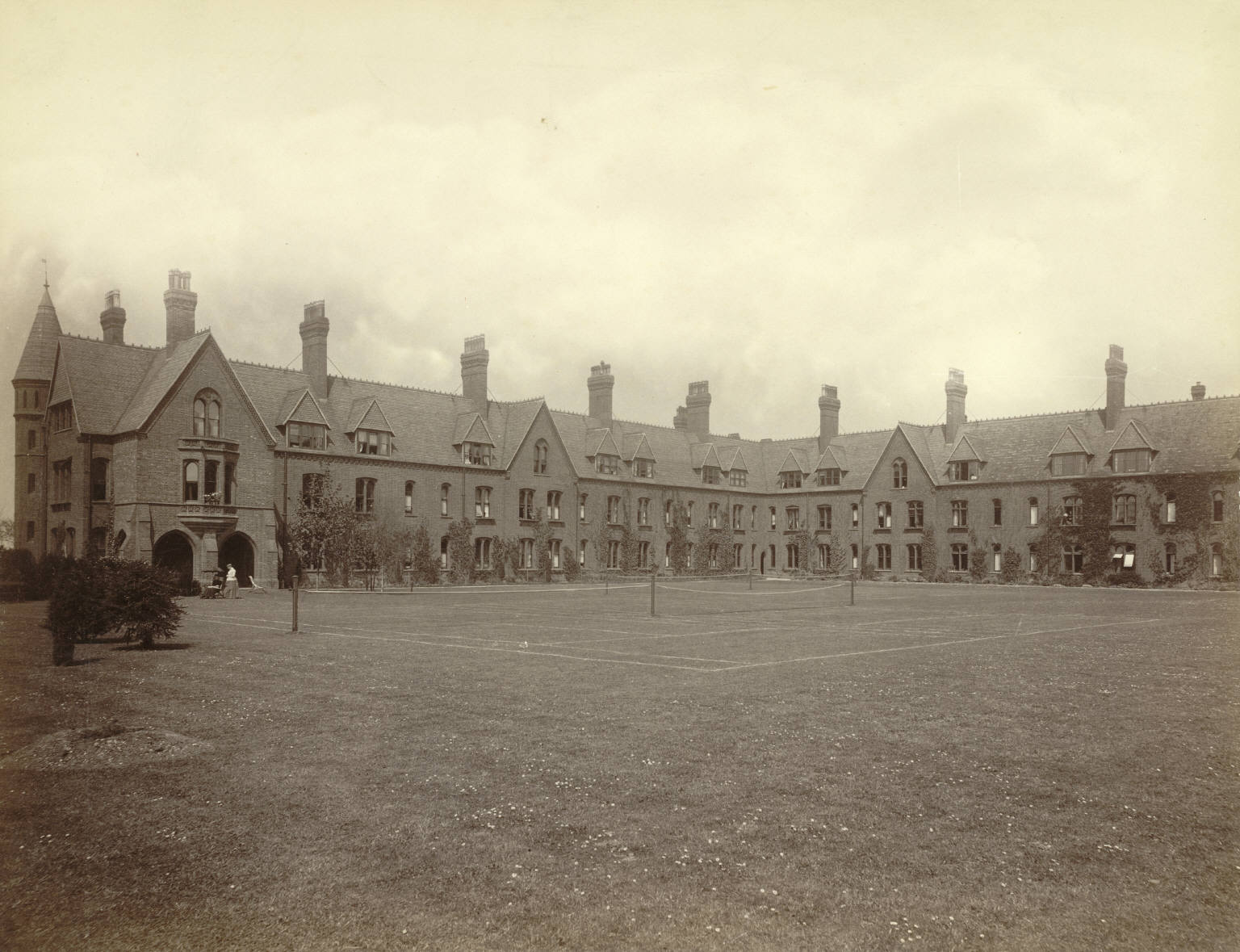
Girton College, 1910s

Adam was a committed Platonist and published a study of Plato's morals, as well as several articles; some regard her most important work to be her 1918 article attacking A E Taylor and J Burnet's idea of Platonic Socrates. Adam believed that Plato embodied Socrates in the metaphysics of the theory of forms, as well as through the doctrine of immortality, not just in moralistic thought. As well as her excellence in Latin and Greek, Adam was proficient in French, German and Italian.

=== Collaborator and editor ===
Adam's husband James was also a Platonist and their collaborations supported his research. In 1893 they co-authored an edition of Protagoras. This is seen particularly clearly in the editions of his work that Adam produced after her husband's early death.

In editing and ensuring publication of her husband's work, Adam made an additional significant contribution to classical scholarship. Adam edited her husband's Gifford Lectures into a volume entitled Religious Teachers Of Greece, which she prefaced with a memoir of her husband. She also edited an additional volume of her husband's lectures after his death, entitled The Vitality of Platonism. These lectures illustrated his thoughts on Plato during what were to be the final years of his life.

=== Publications ===
- Platonis Protagoras (1893) [co-authored with J Adam]
- The Religious Teachers of Greece (1908) [co-authored with J Adam]
- Early Ideals of Righteousness (1910) [co-authored with R H Kennett & Henry Gwatkin]
- The Vitality of Platonism, and Other Essays (1911) [co-authored with J Adam]
- Plato: Moral & Political Ideals (1913)
- The Apology of Socrates (1914) [editor]
- 'The Mysticism of Greece' The Expository Times (1916)
- 'The Mysticism of Rome' The Expository Times (1916)
- 'Socrates, ‘Qvantvm Mvtatvs Ab Illo’' The Classical Quarterly (1918)
- Arthur Innes Adam, 1894-1916: A record founded on his letters (1920)
- 'The Value of Plato's Laws Today' Philosophical Review (1922)

== Family life ==
Adela Marion Kensington was born on 10 June 1866 in London. Her father was Arthur Kensington, who was a Fellow of Trinity College, Oxford, and Rebecca le Geyt Kensington; Adela was the youngest of ten children; as such she was almost named 'Decima'. She was educated at Bedford College, London from 1882–5. She then studied the Classical Tripos at Girton College from 1885–9, gaining first class honours.; she was also the first Girtonian to be awarded a special distinction in the tripos. Adam's contemporaries at Girton included Ella Edghill, Marie Williams and Dorothy Tarrant. Whilst at Girton she met her future husband James Adam, who was teaching the female students. Their courtship partly took place on a tour of Greece and they were married at St Mary's, Paddington, in London in July 1890. They settled in Cambridge and had three children: Neil Kensington Adam (born 1891, chemist), Arthur Innes Adam (born 1894, classicist and soldier) and Barbara Adam (born 1897, sociologist and criminologist, later Baroness Wootton).

In 1900 the family moved into a house that was part of Emmanuel College. Both Neil and Barbara recalled a happy, if highly educational childhood, where all three were taught Latin and Greek by their mother from a very young age. Even the family's cat was called Plato. After the death of her husband in 1907, Adam continued to bring up her family. Both her sons were on active service during the First World War: Neil in the Royal Naval Air Service; Arthur, who was killed in France in 1917. After Arthur's death, Adam used his family letters to write and publish a record of his life, which was published in 1920.

Adam was a committed suffragist and her daughter recalled suffrage meetings often being held in their home; although her mother would have nothing to do with the militant faction. Adam was on the committee of the Cambridge branch of the National Union of Women's Suffrage Societies. In 1917 she was the lead signature on a letter to the local Cambridge press expressing disappointment that the local electoral reform committee continued to resist the enfranchisement of women.

=== Later life ===
Adam retired as a Governor of Girton in 1932. In later life she travelled widely, including a trip to Russia, to the Near-East and up the Amazon River. She died of a heart attack on 12 August 1944.

=== Legacy ===
Adam's edition of The Apology of Socrates was republished by Cambridge University Press in 1964.
