= Edward Byles Cowell =

English professor of Sanskrit

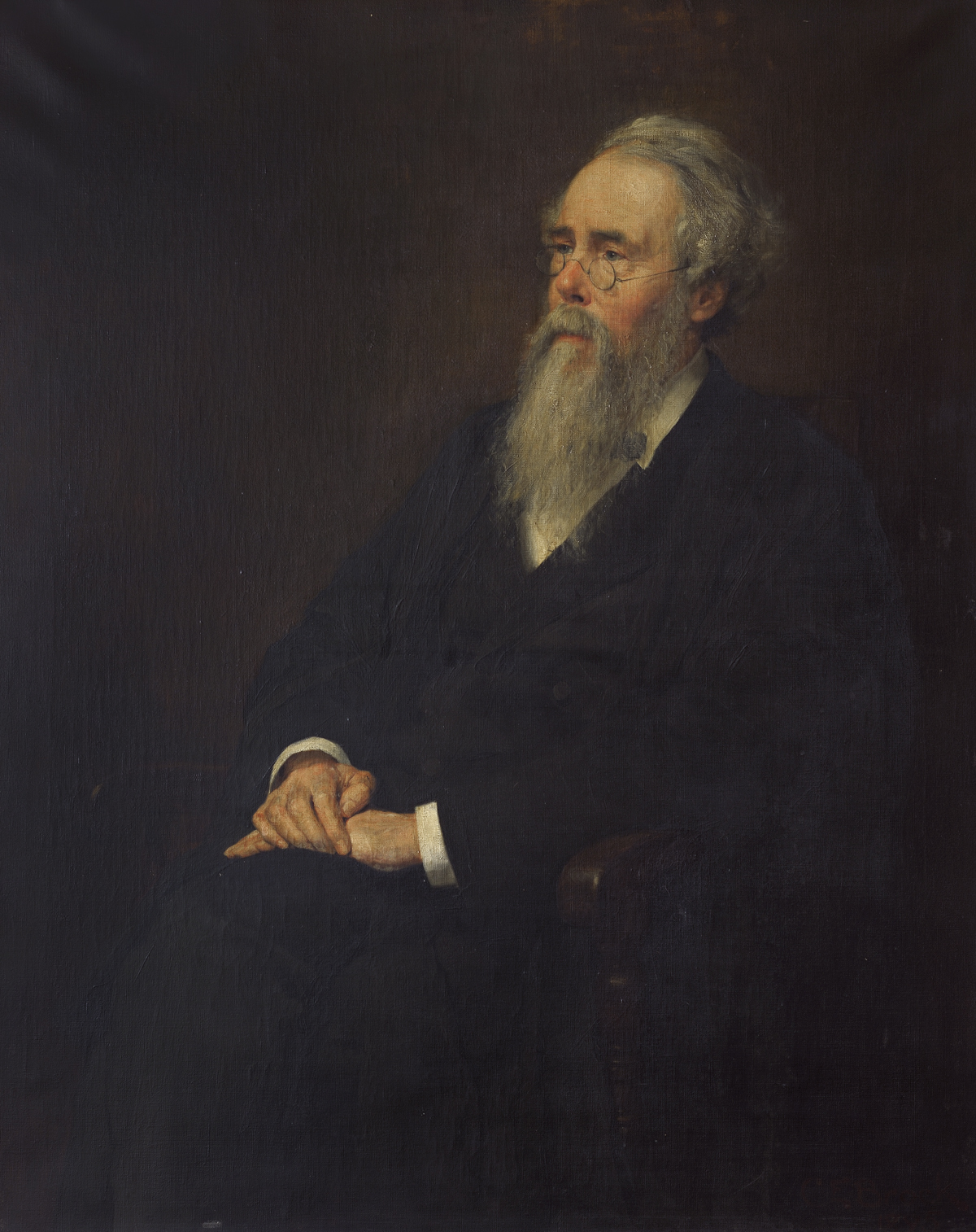
Portrait of Edward Byles Cowell by Charles Edmund Brock, 1895.

Edward Byles Cowell, FBA (23 January 1826 – 9 February 1903) was a noted translator of Persian poetry and the first professor of Sanskrit at Cambridge University.

== Early life ==
Cowell was born in Ipswich, the son of Charles Cowell and Marianne Byles. Samuel Cowell, the printer, was his uncle and Elizabeth "Beth" Cowell, the painter, was his sister.

He became interested in Oriental languages at the age of fifteen, when he found a copy of Sir William Jones's works (including his Persian Grammar) in the public library. Self-taught, he began translating and publishing Hafez within the year.

On the death of his father in 1842 he took over the family business. He married in 1845, and in 1850 entered Magdalen College, Oxford, where he studied and catalogued Persian manuscripts for the Bodleian Library. From 1856 to 1867 he lived in Calcutta as professor of English history at Presidency College. He was also as principal of Sanskrit College from 1858 to 1864. In this year he discovered a manuscript of Omar Khayyám's quatrains in the Asiatic Society's library and sent a copy to London for his friend and student, Edward Fitzgerald, who then produced the famous English translations (the Rubaiyat of Omar Khayyam, 1859). He also published, unsigned, an introduction to Khayyám with translations of thirty quatrains in the Calcutta Review (1858).

Having studied Hindustani, Bengali, and Sanskrit with Indian scholars, he returned to England to take up an appointment as the first professor of Sanskrit at Cambridge. He was professor from 1867 until his death in 1903. He was made an honorary member of the German Oriental Society (DMG) in 1895, was awarded the Royal Asiatic Society's first gold medal in 1898, and in 1902 became a founding member of the British Academy.

In 1904 Macmillan published Life and Letters of Edward Byles Cowell: Professor of Sanskrit at Cambridge, 1867–1903 by his cousin George Cowell, F.R.C.S.

== Selected works ==
- "The Mesnavi of Jelaleddin Rumi," The Gentleman's Magazine, N.S. 30, 1848, pp. 39–46, 148–52.
- "Persian Cuneiform Inscriptions and Persian Ballads," Westminster and Foreign Quarterly Review 53, 1850, pp. 38–56.
- "Omar Khayyam, the Astronomer Poet of Persia", Calcutta Review 30, 1858, pp. 149–62.
- "Gyges' Ring in Plato and Nizami," J(R)ASB 3, no. 2, 1861, pp. 151–57.
- "An Inaugural Lecture, delivered October 23, 1867" [on the foundation of the Sanskrit Professorship at the University of Cambridge]. London; Cambridge : Macmillan & Co., 1867.
- "Two Kasídahs of the Persian Poet Anwarí," with E. H. Palmer, The Journal of Philology 4, no. 7, 1872, pp. 1–47.
- Buddhist Mahâyâna Texts. Part 1. The Buddha-karita of Asvaghosha, translated from the Sanskrit, in the Sacred Books of the East, vol. 49, Oxford University Press, 1894.
- The Jataka or Stories of the Buddha's Former Births, Vol.1-6, Cambridge at the University Press (1895).
