= Neil Kensington Adam =

British chemist (1891–1973)

- Adam in June 1935.
- Born: 5 November 1891; Cambridge, England
- Died: 19 July 1973 (aged 81); Southampton, England
- Education: Trinity College, Cambridge
- Awards: Fellow of the Royal Society
- Scientific career
- Institutions: University of Sheffield; University College London; University of Southampton; University of Cambridge

Neil Kensington Adam FRS, FRIC (5 November 1891 – 19 July 1973) was a British chemist.

== Education ==
Adam was born in Cambridge, the first of three children of James Adam (1860–1907), a Classics don, and his classicist wife Adela Marion (née Kensington) (1866–1944). His sister Barbara was a noted sociologist and criminologist, while his brother Captain Arthur Innes Adam was killed in France on 16 September 1916. His maternal uncle was Sir Alfred Kensington, a judge in the Chief Court of the Punjab.

Adam was educated at Winchester College, and then studied chemistry at Trinity College, Cambridge, where he later became a fellow (1915–1923). He graduated BA in 1913, received his MA in 1919, and Sc.D in 1928.

== Career ==
During the First World War, he served at the Royal Naval Air Service airship station at Kingsnorth, Kent, working on problems associated with rubber-proofing fabric for airships, and other chemical problems.

Adam was Sorby Research Fellow at the University of Sheffield from 1921 to 1929, then a Research Associate (1930–1936) and Lecturer (1936–1937) at University College London. He was Professor of Chemistry at the University of Southampton from 1937 until 1957.

== Personal life ==
Adam was married to Winifred Wright; they were active Christian Scientists. Adam died, aged 81, in Southampton.

== Publications ==
- Adam, N. K. (1930). The Physics and Chemistry of Surfaces. London: Oxford University Press.
- Adam, N. K. (1956). Physical Chemistry. Oxford: Clarendon Press.
