= Kinmuck =

Village in Scotland

Coordinates: 57.269°N 2.303°W

Kinmuck: Scottish Gaelic: Ceann nam Muc
- Location within Aberdeenshire
- OS grid reference: NJ 818198
- Council area: Aberdeenshire
- Lieutenancy area: Aberdeenshire
- Country: Scotland
- Sovereign state: United Kingdom
- Post town: Inverurie
- Postcode district: AB51
- Police: Scotland
- Fire: Scottish
- Ambulance: Scottish
- UK Parliament: Gordon and Buchan
- Scottish Parliament: Aberdeenshire East

Kinmuck is a small village in the parish of Keithhall and Kinkell in Aberdeenshire, Scotland, about 3 miles (4.8 km) south-east of Inverurie.
