= Jane Ellen Harrison =

British classical scholar, linguist and feminist (1850–1928)

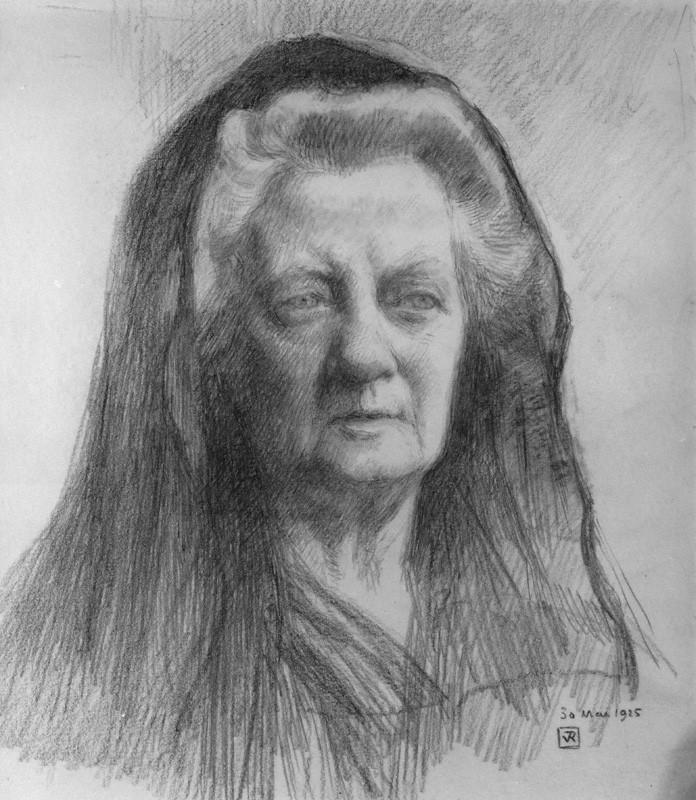
- 1925 portrait of Harrison by Théo van Rysselberghe
- Born: 9 September 1850; Cottingham, Yorkshire, England
- Died: 15 April 1928 (aged 77); Bloomsbury, England
- Resting place: St Marylebone cemetery, East Finchley
- Education: Cheltenham Ladies' College; Newnham College, Cambridge
- Occupations: Classicist and linguist
- Organization(s): Lecturer, Newnham College, 1898–1922
- Known for: One of the founders of modern studies in Greek mythology
- Awards: Two honorary doctorates, an LLD from University of Aberdeen in 1895 and DLitt from the University of Durham in 1897.

Jane Ellen Harrison (9 September 1850 – 15 April 1928) was a British classical scholar and linguist. With Karl Kerenyi and Walter Burkert, Harrison is one of the founders of modern studies in Ancient Greek religion and mythology. She applied 19th-century archaeological discoveries to the interpretation of ancient Greek religion in ways that have become standard. She has also been credited with being the first woman to obtain a post in England as a 'career academic'. Harrison argued for women's suffrage but thought she would never want to vote herself. Ellen Wordsworth Crofts, later second wife of Sir Francis Darwin, was Jane Harrison's best friend from her student days at Newnham, and during the period from 1898 to Ellen's death in 1903. The depth and influence of Harrison's friendship with Eugénie Sellers Strong—ended by a dramatic breach in the 1890s—is explored in a monograph by Mary Beard: after their break-up Sellers became an influential authority on the material culture of Imperial Rome, while Harrison's work dug deeper and deeper into the primitive ritual origins of Greek drama. Though moving in different directions chronologically, in terms of their focus, the women appear otherwise as doppelgängers of one another in their concerns, style and characteristic forms of argument deriving from an approach that became known as classical anthropology. Harrison's Prolegomena to Greek Religion had a compelling and inspirational impact on the later work of T. S. Eliot, Virginia Woolf, and Hilda Doolittle and her scholarly legerdemain was formative to the group of classicists known as the Cambridge ritualists.

== Life and career ==
Harrison was born in Cottingham, Yorkshire on 9 September 1850 to Charles and Elizabeth Harrison. Her father was a timber merchant. Her mother died of puerperal fever shortly after she was born and she was educated by a series of governesses. Her governesses taught her German, Latin, Ancient Greek and Hebrew, but she later expanded her knowledge to about sixteen languages, including Russian.

Harrison spent most of her professional life at Newnham College, the progressive, recently established college for women at Cambridge. Mary Beard described Harrison as "the first woman in England to become an academic, in the fully professional sense – an ambitious, full-time, salaried, university researcher and lecturer".

Between 1880 and 1897, Harrison studied Greek art and archaeology at the British Museum under Sir Charles Newton. Harrison then supported herself lecturing at the museum and at schools (mostly private boy's schools).

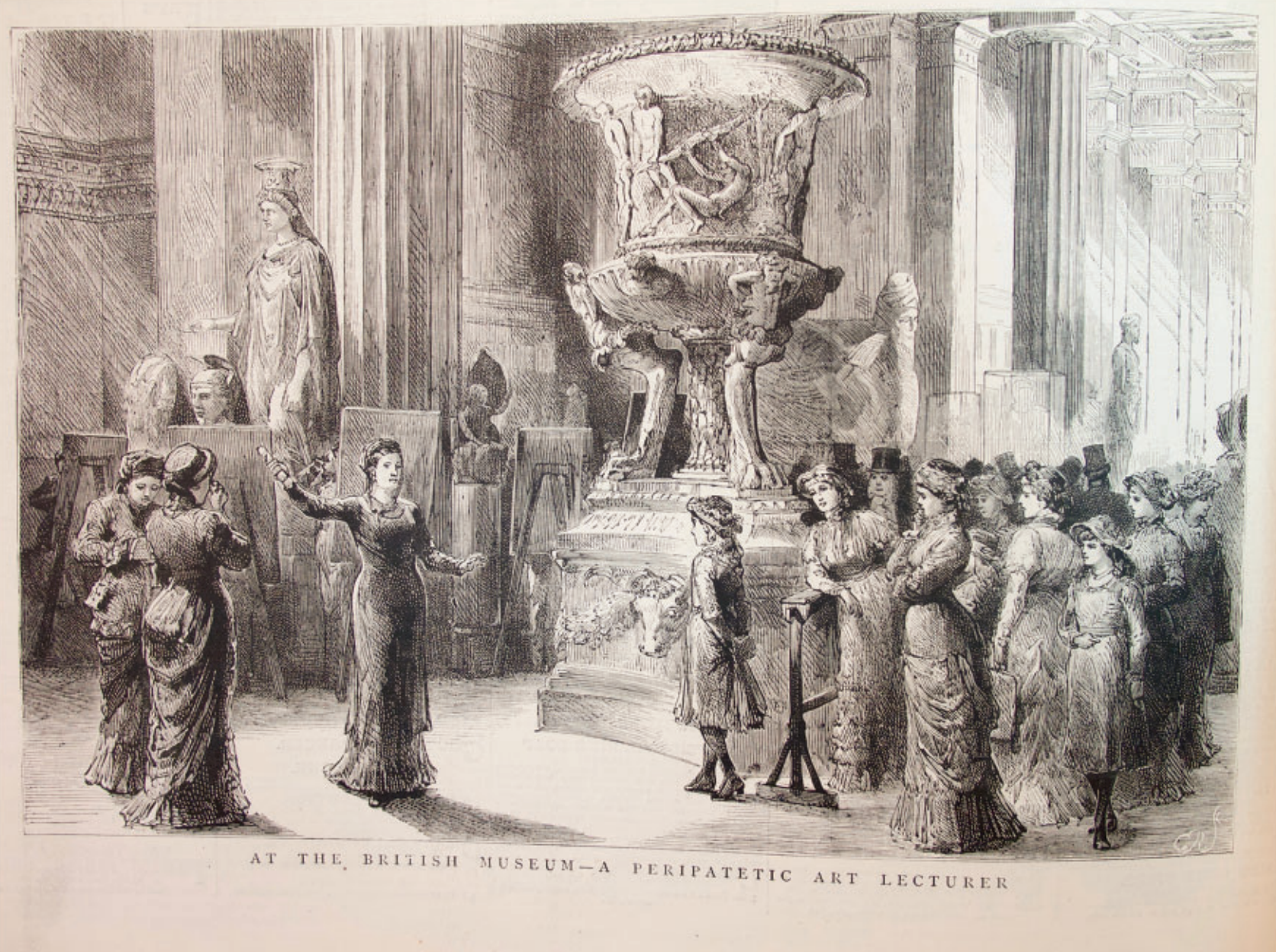
Jane Harrison lecturing to a group of women and girls at the British Museum in 1881.

Her lectures became widely popular and 1,600 people ended up attending her Glasgow lecture on Athenian gravestones. She travelled to Italy and Germany, where she met the scholar from Prague, Wilhelm Klein. Klein introduced her to Wilhelm Dörpfeld who invited her to participate in his archaeological tours in Greece. Her early book The Odyssey in Art and Literature then appeared in 1882. In 1888, she began to publish in the periodical that Oscar Wilde was editing called The Woman's World on "The Pictures of Sappho". She ended up translating Mythologie figurée de la Grèce (1883) by Maxime Collignon as well as providing personal commentary to selections of Pausanias, Mythology & Monuments of Ancient Athens by Margaret Verrall in the same year. These two major works caused Harrison to be awarded honorary degrees from the universities of Durham (1897) and Aberdeen (1895).

Harrison was engaged to marry the scholar R. A. Neil, but he died suddenly of appendicitis in 1901 before they could marry.

Harrison became the central figure of the group known as the Cambridge Ritualists. In 1903, her book Prolegomena on the Study of Greek Religion appeared. Harrison became close to Francis MacDonald Cornford (1874–1943), and when he married in 1909 she became extremely upset. She then made a new friendship with Hope Mirrlees, whom she referred to as her "spiritual daughter".

Harrison retired from Newnham in 1922 and then moved to Paris to live with Mirrlees. She and Mirrlees returned to London in 1925 where she was able to publish her memoirs through Leonard and Virginia Woolf's press, The Hogarth Press. She died at age 77 at her home in Bloomsbury. She was buried in St Marylebone Cemetery, East Finchley.

Harrison was an atheist.

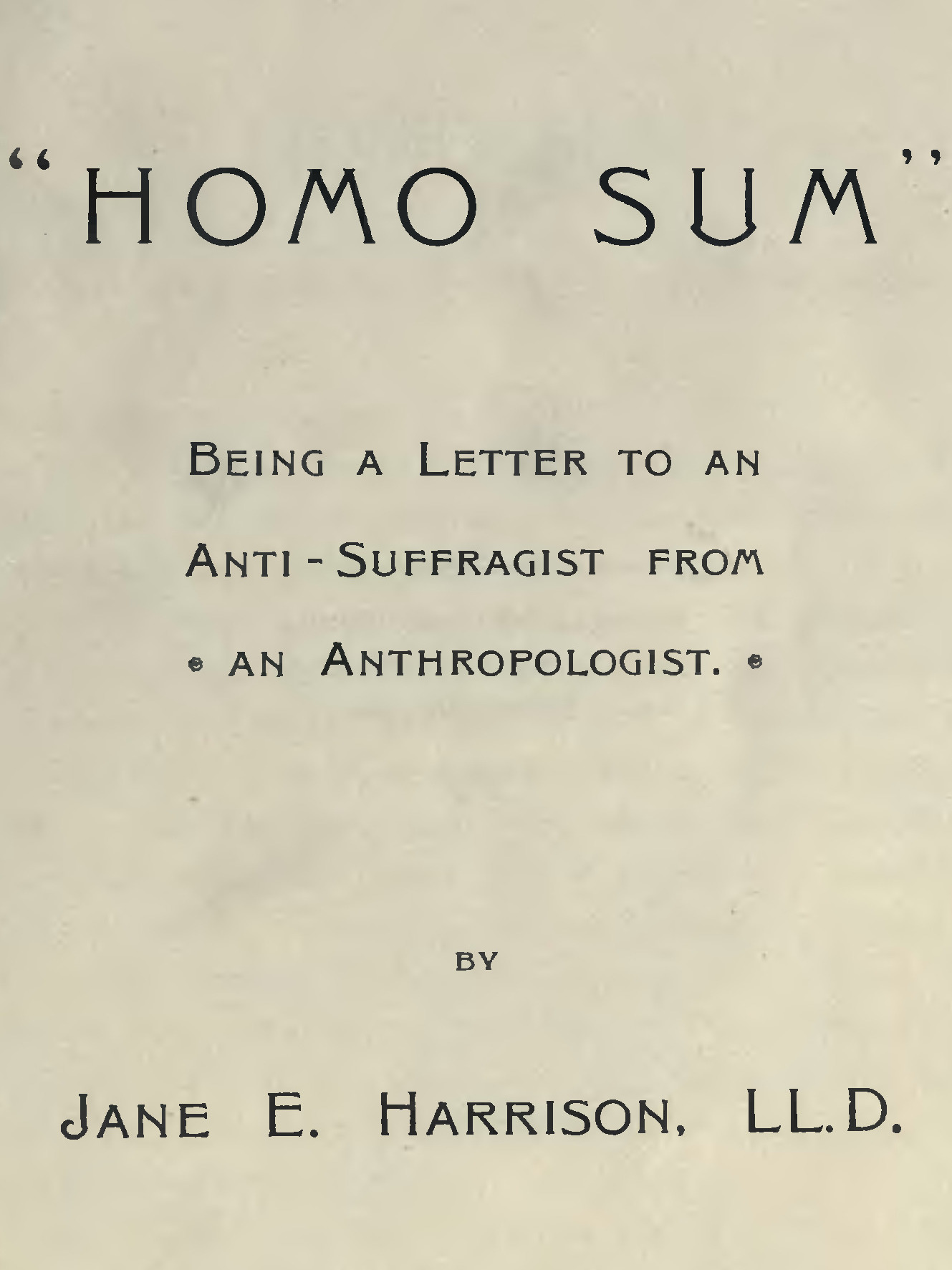
Pamphlet title page from "Homo Sum" Being a Letter to an Anti-Suffragist from an Anthropologist by Jane E. Harrison LL. D.

Harrison was, at least ideologically, a moderate suffragist. Rather than support women's suffrage by protesting, Harrison applied her scholarship in anthropology to defend women's right to vote. In responding to an anti-suffragist critic, Harrison demonstrates this moderate ideology:

[The Women's Movement] is not an attempt to arrogate man's prerogative of manhood; it is not even an attempt to assert and emphasize women's privilege of womanhood; it is simply the demand that in the life of woman, as in the life of man, space and liberty shall be found for a thing bigger than either manhood or womanhood – for humanity. (84–85, Alpha and Omega)

To this end, Harrison's motto was Terence's homo sum; humani nihil mihi alienum est ("I am a human being; nothing that is human do I account alien.")

== Career ==
=== Scholarship ===
Harrison began formal study at Cheltenham Ladies' College, where she gained a Certificate, and, in 1874, continued her studies in the classics at Cambridge University's Newnham College. Her early work earned Harrison two honorary doctorates, an LLD from University of Aberdeen in 1895, and DLitt from the University of Durham in 1897. This recognition afforded Harrison the opportunity to return to Newnham College as a lecturer in 1898, and her position was renewed continuously until Harrison retired in 1922. She had been a candidate for the Yates Professor of Classical Art and Archaeology at University College London after Reginald Stuart Poole had died in 1895. The hiring committee had recommended Harrison to the position, but that decision was blocked by Flinders Petrie in favour of Ernest Gardner. Petrie argued that while Harrison was an expert on religion, she did not have the knowledge base Gardner did, so he got the job and worked closely with Petrie for 30 years.

=== Early work ===
Harrison's first monograph, in 1882, drew on the thesis that both Homer's Odyssey and motifs of the Greek vase-painters were drawing upon similar deep sources for mythology, the opinion that had not been common in earlier classical archaeology, that the repertory of vase-painters offered some unusual commentaries on myth and ritual. Her approach in her great work, Prolegomena to the Study of Greek Religion (1903), was to proceed from the ritual to the myth it inspired: "In theology facts are harder to seek, truth more difficult to formulate than in ritual." Thus she began her book with analyses of the best-known of the Athenian festivals: Anthesteria, harvest festivals Thargelia, Kallynteria, Plynteria, and the women's festivals, in which she detected many primitive survivals, Skirophoria, Stenia and Haloa.

=== Cultural evolution (or social Darwinism) ===
Harrison alluded to and commented on the cultural applications of Charles Darwin's work. Harrison and her generation depended upon anthropologist Edward Burnett Tylor (who was himself influenced by Darwin and evolutionary ideas) for some new themes of cultural evolution, especially his 1871 work, Primitive Culture: researches into the development of mythology, philosophy, religion, language, art, and custom. After a socially Darwinian analysis of the origins of religion, Harrison argues that religiosity is anti-intellectual and dogmatic, yet she defended the cultural necessity of religion and mysticism. In her essay The Influence of Darwinism on the Study of Religion (1909), Harrison concluded:

Every dogma religion has hitherto produced is probably false, but for all that the religious or mystical spirit may be the only way of apprehending some things, and these of enormous importance. It may also be that the contents of this mystical apprehension cannot be put into language without being falsified and misstated, that they have rather to be felt and lived than uttered and intellectually analyzed; yet they are somehow true and necessary to life. (176, Alpha and Omega)

== Later life ==
World War I marked a deep break in Harrison's life. Harrison never visited Italy or Greece after the war: she mostly wrote revisions or synopses of previous publications, and pacifist leanings isolated her. Upon retiring (in 1922), Harrison briefly lived in Paris, but she returned to London when her health began to fail. During the last two years of her life Harrison was living at 11 Mecklenburgh Square on the fringes of Bloomsbury.

== In literature ==
In A Room of One's Own (1929), in addition to female authors, Virginia Woolf also discusses and draws inspiration from Harrison. Harrison is presented in the essay only by her initials separated by long dashes, and Woolf first introduces Harrison as "the famous scholar, could it be J---- H---- herself?"

The critic Camille Paglia (see Paglia's 1990 book Sexual Personae (passim), and the long essay "Junk Bonds and Corporate Raiders: Academe in the Hour of the Wolf" in Paglia's Sex, Art and American Culture: New Essays, 1993) has written of Harrison's influence on her own work. Paglia argues that Harrison's career has been ignored by second-wave feminists, who Paglia thinks object to Harrison's findings and efface the careers of prominent pre–World War II female scholars to bolster their claims of male domination in academia.

Tina Passman, in 1993 in her article "Out of the Closet and into the Field: Matriculture, the Lesbian Perspective, and Feminist Classics", discussed the neglect of Harrison by the academy, and tied that neglect to an unpopularity of lesbian perspectives in the field.

Mary Beard's numerous essays and her book on Harrison's life, (The Invention of Jane Harrison, Harvard University Press, 2000), as well as several other biographies of Harrison, have moved the needle toward greater appreciation of Harrison's achievements, as well as further understanding of the context in which she worked.

== Works ==
=== Greek topics ===
Books on the anthropological search for the origins of Greek religion and mythology, include:

- Harrison, Jane Ellen (1903). Prolegomena to the Study of Greek Religion. Cambridge University Press – via Internet Archive. (revised 1908 and 1922)
- — (1906). Primitive Athens as Described by Thucydides. Cambridge University Press.
- — (1911). Heresy and Humanity.
- — (1912). Themis: A Study of the Social Origins of Greek Religion. Cambridge University Press – via Internet Archive. (revised 1927)
- — (1913). Ancient Art and Ritual. Oxford University Press – via Internet Archive.
- — (1921). Epilegomena to the Study of Greek Religion. Cambridge University Press – via Internet Archive.

=== Essays and reflections ===
- Alpha and Omega (1915)
- Reminiscences of a Student's Life (1925)

== See also ==
- History of feminism
- Life-death-rebirth deity
- List of Bloomsbury Group people
