= Sandeep Parmar =

Contemporary poet, born in Nottingham, England

Sandeep Parmar is a contemporary poet. Born in Nottingham, England, and raised in Southern California, she divides her time between London and Ithaca, NY. Parmar was a professor of English Literature at the University of Liverpool and is now a Professor of Literatures in English at Cornell University. She is a Fellow of the Royal Society of Literature and the Royal Society of Arts.

She earned an MA from the University of East Anglia and a PhD from University College London.

Her poetry collections include The Marble Orchard (Shearsman 2012), Eidolon (Shearsman 2015) and Faust (Shearsman 2022). She is also the author of Reading Mina Loy's Autobiographies: Myth of the Modern Woman (Bloomsbury 2013), and the editor of The Collected Poems of Hope Mirrlees (Carcanet 2011) and Nancy Cunard's Selected Poems (Carcanet 2016).

== See also ==
- British Poetry Revival
- Nancy Cunard
- Hope Mirrlees
- Mina Loy
