= Montagu Butler =

Montagu Butler may refer to:

- Henry Montagu Butler (1833–1918), British academic and clergyman, Master of Trinity College, Cambridge
  - Edward Montagu Butler (1866–1948, English first-class cricketer and schoolmaster (son of Henry Montagu Butler)
  - Arthur Hugh Montagu Butler (1873–1943), House of Lords Librarian (son of Henry Montagu Butler)
  - Sir James Ramsay Montagu Butler (1889–1975), British politician and academic (son of Henry Montagu Butler)
  - Sir Nevile Montagu Butler (1893–1973), British diplomat (son of Henry Montagu Butler)
- Montagu Sherard Dawes Butler (1873–1952), British academic and colonial administrator, Master of Pembroke College, Cambridge
- Montagu C. Butler (1884–1970), British academic, lexicographer, musician, and Esperantist
  - Montagu C. Butler Library, Esperanto library at Wedgwood Memorial College
