= John Leary =

John Leary may refer to:

- John Leary (politician) (1837–1905), businessman, mayor of Seattle (1884–1885)
- John Leary (baseball) (1891–1961), 1910s baseball player
- John Leary (cricketer) (1867-1940), Australian cricketer
- Jack Leary (1857–1905), 1880s baseball player
- John J. Leary Jr. (1874–1944), American journalist
- Scott Leary (John Scott Leary, 1881–1958), American swimmer
- John P. Leary (died 1993), Jesuit priest, president of Gonzaga University (1961–1969)
- John Leary (actor), Australian theatre and television actor (active from 1990s through present), Kangaroo Creek Gang and others
- John S. Leary (1845–1904), American lawyer and politician
- John Frederic Leary (1798–1861), British librarian and antiquarian

== See also ==
- John O'Leary (disambiguation)
