= David Lewis Jones =

Welsh historian and Librarian of the House of Lords

David Lewis Jones CBE (4 January 1945 – 15 October 2010) was a Welsh librarian and historian who was the librarian of the House of Lords Library from 1991 to 2006.

== Early life and education ==
Jones was born in Riversdale, Aberaeron, Cardiganshire, to Gwilym and Joyce Jones. He was educated at Aberaeron Grammar School and read history at Jesus College, Oxford.

== Career ==
=== Librarian ===
Jones began his career as an assistant librarian at the Institute of Historical Research in London, 1970–72, before returning to Wales for five years as the law librarian at the University College of Wales, Aberystwyth, 1972–77.

In 1977, Lord Elwyn-Jones, Lord Chancellor in the Labour Government, recruited Jones to fill the post of deputy librarian of the House of Lords Library. This followed a report by a working group, led by David Eccles, 1st Viscount Eccles, that recommended creating a research service, hiring qualified librarians for the first time, acquiring updated books, and "dipping a toe in information technology". From 1977 to 1991, Jones, the first qualified librarian to serve in the post of deputy librarian, assisted Roger Morgan in transforming the librarian to modern standards.

Working directly with Eccles, Jones oversaw the installation of the Geac ADVANCE multiuser integrated online library system "incorporating acquisitions, cataloguing and serials control features and online access to that catalogue." Jones also created a significant programme for the conservation and cataloguing of the library's historic collections.

Jones succeeded Morgan as librarian in 1991 and continued to work to modernize the library, cooperating with the House of Commons Library in developing shared online systems. Over his 15 years as librarian, he oversaw expansion of the library's holdings and tripled its staff from 10 to 30 by bringing highly qualified research clerks, librarians and secretarial staff to meet the increased demand from the Lords for quick access to research and information.

In 1999, Jones contributed to add upgrades to the working law library for the Law Lords at the Palace of Westminster's West Front.

Morgan was appointed a Commander of the Order of the British Empire (CBE) in the 2005 Birthday Honours, in anticipation of his retirement.

He retired in 2006 and was succeeded by Elizabeth Hallam-Smith.

=== Historian ===
David Lewis Jones was a prolific historian, biographer and bibliographer. He contributed several entries for the biographical dictionaries Oxford Dictionary of National Biography and the Dictionary of Welsh Biography, and authored a book on Eirene White, Baroness White.

From 1994 to 1996, he served as secretary to the Honourable Society of Cymmrodorion. In 1996, he was admitted to the Gorsedd at the National Eisteddfod of Wales in Llandeilo for his services for Welsh culture.

== Death ==
He died in Chiswick, London, following surgery, at age 65.

== Bibliography ==
- Jones, David Lewis (1975). Books in English on the Soviet Union, 1917–73: a bibliography.
- Jones, David Lewis (1986). Peers, Politics, and Power: the House of Lords, 1603–1911.
- Jones, David Lewis (1988). A Parliamentary History of the Glorious Revolution.
- Jones, David Lewis (1979). Paraguay, a Bibliography.
- Jones, David Lewis (1986). Debates and Proceedings of the British Parliaments: a guide to printed sources.
- Jones, David Lewis (1986). British and Irish Biographies, 1840–1940.
- Jones, David Lewis (2001). Eirene: a tribute.
- Jones, David Lewis (1970). Theses on Welsh History Presented before 1970.
- Jones, David Lewis (2009). The Judicial Role of the House of Lords before 1870.

Government offices
Preceded by Roger Morgan	House of Lords Librarian; 1991–2006	Succeeded by Elizabeth Hallam-Smith
