= Roger Morgan (librarian) =

English librarian

Roger Hugh Vaughan Charles Morgan CBE (8 July 1926 – 10 June 2018) was an English librarian who spent four decades in the Houses of Parliament. He is credited with modernising the House of Lords Library as head librarian from 1977 to 1991.

== Early life and education ==
Morgan was born in Chelsea, London, the son of novelists Charles Langbridge Morgan and Hilda Vaughan. His paternal grandfather was engineer Sir Charles Langbridge Morgan. He was the younger brother of Shirley Paget, Marchioness of Anglesey (1924–2017).

He and his sister grew up in Notting Hill until the Second World War, when, fearing a Nazi invasion after the Battle of Dunkirk, they moved with their mother to America. He spent two years at Phillips Academy in Andover, before returning home in 1942 to finish his schooling at Eton.

From 1944 to 1947, Morgan was a member of the Grenadier Guards, rising to the rank of captain and serving in postwar Germany.

He read history at Brasenose College, Oxford, earning an MA.

== Career ==
After leaving Oxford, Morgan worked as a photographer for society magazine Tatler while studying for the bar exam.

In 1951, he began what he thought was a temporary job working in the House of Commons Library, Palace of Westminster. He spent 12 years there before moving to the House of Lords Library, which was badly in need of updating. He took over as head librarian following a report by a working group, led by David Eccles, 1st Viscount Eccles, that recommended creating a research service, hiring qualified librarians for the first time, acquiring updated books, and "dipping a toe in information technology."

Between 1977 and his retirement, Morgan transformed the Lords library at a time when the composition of the House of Lords was evolving. He oversaw its modernisation "from a parliamentary backwater" and "gentleman's reading library" into a "hi-tech source of information for the increasing number of expert, working life peers."

Morgan recruited a research staff and began the massive project of transferring the library's index of some 120,000 books from cards to microfiche. He continued to improve the library as technology advanced. In 1978, the library was equipped with its first two computer terminals and a Prestel machine. When he retired in 1991, the library's entire catalogue was online and had started subscribing to online databases.

Morgan was appointed a Commander of the Order of the British Empire (CBE) in the 1991 New Year Honours.

== Personal life ==
From 1951 to 1965, Morgan was married to Catherine Harriet Waterfield, with whom he had a son and daughter, James and Lucie, and two sons, Luke and Piers, who predeceased him. He married secondly American Susan Vogel Marrian in 1965, and had another son, Tobias.

He suffered three strokes before dying in 2018, aged 91.

== See also ==
- David Menhennet, moderniser of the House of Commons Library

Government offices
Preceded by Christopher Dobson	House of Lords Librarian; 1977–1991	Succeeded by David Lewis Jones
