= Arthur Hugh Montagu Butler =

Librarian at the UK House of Lords Library from 1914 to 1922

Arthur Hugh Montagu Butler (23 November 1873 – 28 May 1943) was an English librarian who was librarian at the House of Lords Library from 1914 to 1922.

== Early life and education ==
Butler was born in Harrow, Middlesex, the second son of academic Henry Montagu Butler and his first wife, Georgina Elliot, granddaughter of diplomat Hugh Elliot. His father was headmaster of Harrow School (1860–85), Dean of Gloucester (1885–86) and Master of Trinity College, Cambridge (1886–1918). His elder brother was Edward Montagu Butler, who played first-class cricket. After their mother's death, his father remarried Agnata Frances Ramsay. Sir James Ramsay Montagu Butler and Sir Nevile Butler were his younger half-brothers. Headmaster George Butler was his grandfather, Rev. Canon George Butler his uncle, and Josephine Butler his aunt.

Butler was educated at Harrow, where he played for the Cricket XI. He and William Francis George Wyndham won the public school rackets championship in 1890.

== Career ==
Butler served as a clerk in the House of Lords from 1895–97, and was assistant librarian under Sandford Arthur Strong (1897–1904) and Sir Edmund Gosse (1904–1914). He succeeded Gosse as librarian in 1914.

In addition to his work at the library, Butler also acted as Secretary of Commissions to Lords Chancellors Robert Reid, 1st Earl Loreburn and Richard Haldane, 1st Viscount Haldane, as well as Secretary to the Statute Law Revision Committee, 1902–22.

Butler oversaw the library alone during the First World War, when his assistant librarian, Charles Travis Clay, was serving overseas. After the war, Butler and Clay started the process of creating a new card catalogue for the library's law books as a replacement for Sandford Arthur Strong's Victorian era catalogue.

On 18 January 1922, Butler booked a room for himself under a false name at the Midland Grand Hotel, St. Pancras. He was found in the bathroom shortly afterwards suffering from a severe wound to the throat in an apparent suicide attempt. He was transferred to University College Hospital, where he underwent surgery and recovered. He resigned his position on health grounds that year and was succeeded by Clay as librarian.

== Personal life ==
In 1900, Butler married Margaret Edith, second daughter of Francis Law Latham, Advocate-General of Bombay, 1884–1893. There had one son and two daughters. He died in 1943 in London.

Government offices
Preceded by Sir Edmund Gosse	House of Lords Librarian; 1914–1922	Succeeded by Sir Charles Travis Clay
