= David Menhennet =

British librarian

David Menhennet CB (4 December 1928 – 5 February 2016) was a British librarian. As librarian at the House of Commons Library from 1976 to 1991, he oversaw a period of modernisation and other improvements to the library, transforming it into a modern research facility.

== Life ==
=== Early life and education ===
Menhennet was born in Redruth, Cornwall, the son of William and Everill Menhennet. He attended Truro School on a scholarship and excelled in languages, going on to graduate with a first in French and German from Oriel College, Oxford. He then moved to Queen's College to study for a D.Phil. in 18th-century French literature.

=== House of Commons career ===
He became a clerk in the Commons Library in 1954. When given responsibility for the research area in 1964 he introduced a system of comprehensive daily briefings for MPs, and he was promoted to Deputy Librarian in 1967. When Speaker George Thomas appointed him 10th Librarian of the Commons Library in 1976, he began a process of modernisation. He set up the Public Information Office (now the House of Commons Information Office) in 1978, and electronic publication began the same year, when the Library contributed to the Prestel viewdata system, which at one time had 90,000 subscribers. Computerisation of the Library's information systems began in 1979 with the creation of the Parliamentary On-Line Information System (POLIS). He also established a service for schools. The new systems introduced by Menhennet enabled MPs to find and check information far more easily, and were used particularly often by Gordon Brown and Tony Blair while in opposition.

Menhennet hosted international conferences at Westminster, and also acted as an adviser to other parliaments. His last reform was to ban smoking in the library.

=== Other activities ===
In 1964 Menhennet was a founder member of the Study of Parliament Group, and also chaired the British Library's Advisory Committee on Bibliographic Services from 1986 to 1992. He also wrote a number of books about Parliament. After his retirement in 1991 he was a visiting research fellow at Goldsmiths College.

Menhennet was a life Fellow of the Royal Society of Arts, a freeman of the City of London and a liveryman of the Stationer's Company. He was appointed Companion of the Order of the Bath (CB) in the Queen's 1991 Birthday Honours.

=== Personal life ===
David Menhennet married Audrey Holmes in 1954. He died on 5 February 2016, survived by Audrey and their two sons.

== Books ==
- 1967: Parliament in Perspective (with John Palmer)
- 1972: Erskine May’s Private Journal 1857-82
- 1991: The House of Commons Library: A History

== See also ==
- Roger Morgan (librarian), moderniser of the House of Lords Library
