= Rachel Maxwell-Hyslop =

Archaeologist and Near Eastern scholar (1914–2011)

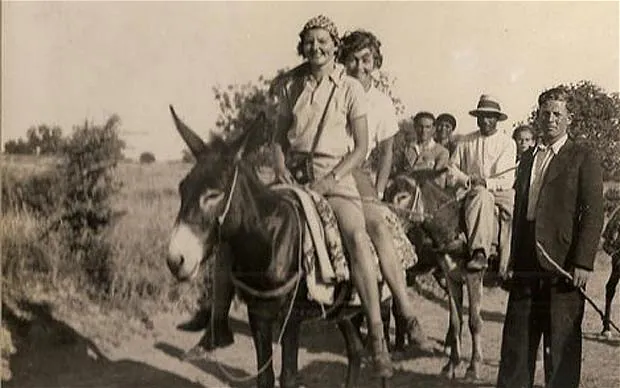
- Rachel Maxwell-Hyslop with Barbara Parker-Mallowan behind her
- Born: 27 March 1914; Chelsea, London, England, United Kingdom
- Died: 9 May 2011 (aged 97); Banbury, England, United Kingdom
- Education: Downe House School
- Alma mater: Sorbonne, UCL Institute of Archaeology
- Known for: Western Asiatic Jewellery: c.3000–612 BC
- Scientific career
- Fields: Archaeologist

Kathleen Rachel Maxwell-Hyslop, FSA, FBA (née Clay, 27 March 1914 – 9 May 2011) was an English archaeologist and scholar of the Ancient Near East.

== Early life ==
Kathleen Rachel Clay was born in London to Sir Charles Travis Clay, an antiquarian and librarian at the House of Lords Library, and Hon. Alice Violet Robson (1892–1972), daughter of William Robson, Baron Robson. She was the eldest of three daughters. She attended Downe House School in Newbury, and graduated from Sorbonne, where she read French.

In 1933, Clay joined Mortimer Wheeler's excavations at Verulamium and Maiden Castle, Dorset. She was inspired by Kathleen Kenyon to join the newly established Institute of Archaeology at the University of London in 1934, one of its first three students. She studied under Sidney Smith and received a postgraduate diploma in Western Asian archaeology.

In 1938, she married Aymer Robert Maxwell-Hyslop, a civil servant. They had three children.

== Career ==
Maxwell-Hyslop was given a role as honorary demonstrator at the Institute of Archaeology's new permanent location near Regent's Park. She was also involved in archaeological digs with Winifred Lamb at Kusura, Turkey.

During the Second World War, she worked at Bletchley Park in the Diplomatic section.

In 1946, Maxwell-Hyslop became a staff member of the department of Western Asiatic archaeology at the Institute. Here she was initially an assistant to Max Mallowan, later becoming a lecturer. Mallowan encouraged her to investigate Near Eastern metalwork. Her archaeological research on metal artefacts from the ancient Near East resulted in two articles on western Asian swords and daggers, establishing a new typology for these matériel.

Maxwell-Hyslop also looked after the administration of Mallowan's excavations at Nimrud, where she was sent as part of her researches into the analysis of materials.

From 1962 to the late 1970s, she continued to teach, concentrating on the ancient metallurgy of the Near East. Her work encompassed a large geography – Egypt to Afghanistan, and long time periods – Bronze Age to Late Assyrian, and she published papers on their jewellery, metal working and technology. She also was interested in horticulture, writing a piece on the distribution of the sissoo tree across the Middle East.

In 1971, she published her authoritative survey of Western Asian jewellery and ornaments, again establishing a typology and demonstrating the links between articles found across the ancient Near East. As an attempt to synthesise the disparate material, it has not been superseded despite later discoveries at sites such as Nimrud, but only refined in its view of dating and distribution.

In 1972, Maxwell-Hyslop gave a lecture at the Fifth International Congress of Iranian Art and Archaeology, discussing how beads or granules of gold could be attached to rings and bracelets, noting that the art evidently originated from Queen Pu-Abi's tomb, dating to 3500 years b.p. in Ur.

== Honours ==
Maxwell-Hyslop was elected a fellow of the Society of Antiquaries of London in 1943, and of the British Academy in 1991.

== Later life ==
Between 1958 and 1996, Maxwell-Hyslop was on the council of the British School of Archaeology in Iraq, presiding it between 2004 and 2007. She died at the Horton Hospital in Banbury on 9 May 2011 and was buried at the church of St Michael and All Angels in Great Tew.

== Sources ==
=== Publications ===
- Maxwell-Hyslop, Rachel (1946). "Daggers and Swords in Western Asia: A Study from Prehistoric Times to 600 B.C.". Iraq. VIII. London: British School of Archaeology in Iraq: 1–65. doi:10.2307/4199525. JSTOR 4199525. S2CID 128603280.
- Maxwell-Hyslop, Rachel (Spring 1949). "Western Asiatic Shaft-Hole Axes". Iraq. XI (1). London: British School of Archaeology in Iraq: 90–129. doi:10.2307/4241690. JSTOR 4241690. S2CID 131580550.
- Maxwell-Hyslop, Rachel (1971). Western Asiatic Jewellery, c.3000-612 B.C. Handbooks of Archaeology. Methuen. ISBN 978-0416158304.
- Maxwell-Hyslop, Rachel (1972). "The Metals amutu and asi'u in the Kültepe Texts". Anatolian Studies. 22: 159–162. doi:10.2307/3642560. JSTOR 3642560. S2CID 163948732.
- Maxwell-Hyslop, Rachel (1980). "A Note on the Jewellery Listed in the Inventory of Manninni". Anatolian Studies. 30: 85. doi:10.2307/3642780. JSTOR 3642780. S2CID 130152381.
- Stech-Wheeler, T.; Muhly, J.D.; Maxwell-Hyslop, R. (1981). "Iron at Taanach and Early Iron Metallurgy in the Eastern Mediterranean". American Journal of Archaeology. 85 (3): 245–268. doi:10.2307/504169. JSTOR 504169. S2CID 193028691.
- Maxwell-Hyslop, Rachel (1983). "Dalbergia sissoo Roxburgh". Anatolian Studies. 33: 67–72. doi:10.2307/3642692. JSTOR 3642692. S2CID 192972044.
- Maxwell-Hyslop, Rachel (1993). "Early Bronze Age Tin and the Taurus". American Journal of Archaeology.

=== Biographical ===
- Maxwell-Hyslop, Rachel (1999). "Some personal reminiscences of the Institute of Archaeology, 1933–62". Archaeology International. 3: 6. doi:10.5334/ai.0304. Archived from the original on 19 July 2018.
- "Rachel Maxwell-Hyslop". The Daily Telegraph. 3 August 2011.
- Falkiner, Richard (28 June 2011). "Rachel Maxwell-Hyslop obituary". The Guardian.
- Curtis, John (2015). "Hyslop, (Kathleen) Rachel Maxwell-: archaeologist and Near Eastern scholar". Oxford Dictionary of National Biography. doi:10.1093/ref:odnb/103800.
