= Christopher Dobson =

Christopher Dobson may refer to:

- Chris Dobson (1949–2019), British chemist
- Christopher Dobson (librarian) (1916–2005), English librarian
