= John O'Leary =

John O'Leary may refer to:

== Arts and entertainment ==
- John O'Leary (journalist), editor of the Times Higher Education Supplement

== Government and politics ==
- John O'Leary (ambassador) (1947–2005), U.S. ambassador to Chile
- John O'Leary (Fenian) (1830–1907), Irish nationalist who was imprisoned in England
- John O'Leary (Kerry politician) (1933–2015), Irish Fianna Fáil party politician and TD for Kerry South
- John O'Leary (Wexford politician) (1894–1959), Irish Labour party politician and TD for Wexford
- John F. O'Leary (1926–1987), U.S. head of Federal Energy Administration

== Sports ==
- John O'Leary (Canadian football) (1954–2026), Canadian football running back
- John O'Leary (Gaelic footballer) (born 1961), Irish Gaelic footballer
- John O'Leary (golfer) (1949–2020), Irish golfer
- John O'Leary (sport shooter) (1880–1967), British Olympic sport shooter
- Jack O'Leary (1929–1983), American football and basketball coach, college athletics administrator
- Jack O'Leary (runner) (born 1997), Irish long-distance runner

== See also ==
- John Leary (disambiguation)
