= John Frederic Leary =

British librarian and antiquarian

John Frederic Leary FSA (1798 – 1 August 1861) was a British librarian and antiquarian who was the first librarian at the House of Lords Library.

Leary was born in London. In 1826, he was working as a clerk when he was appointed the first librarian at the new library established at the House of Lords. He remained in place until his death in 1861.

Leary was at work on 16 October 1834 during the 1834 Parliament fire. He and the Lords clerks "afforded very prompt aid" to prevent damage to the library, which emerged unscathed, unlike the majority of the building, including the House of Commons Library.

He was elected a Fellow of the Society of Antiquaries of London (FSA) in 1842.

He died on the job at the House of Lords in Westminster, unmarried. He left all his belongings to his sister, Elizabeth Leary, also an employee of the House of Lords.

Government offices
Preceded by Office established	House of Lords Librarian; 1826–1861	Succeeded by James Heard Pulman
