= Pezé Pilleau =

18th-century English silversmith

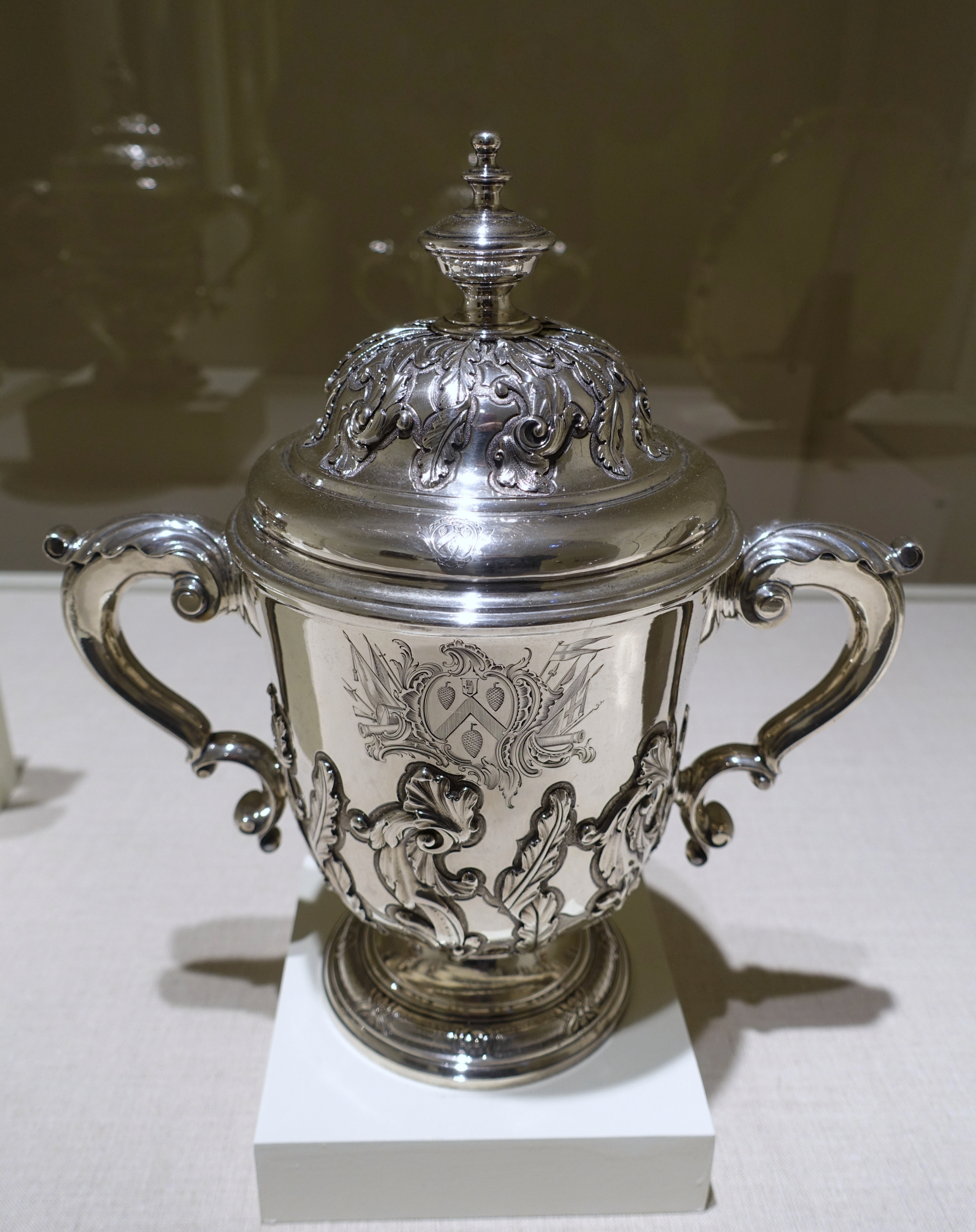
Grace Cup commemorating William Pepperrell's leadership in the Siege of Louisbourg (1745), by Pezé Pilleau, England, c. 1740–5.

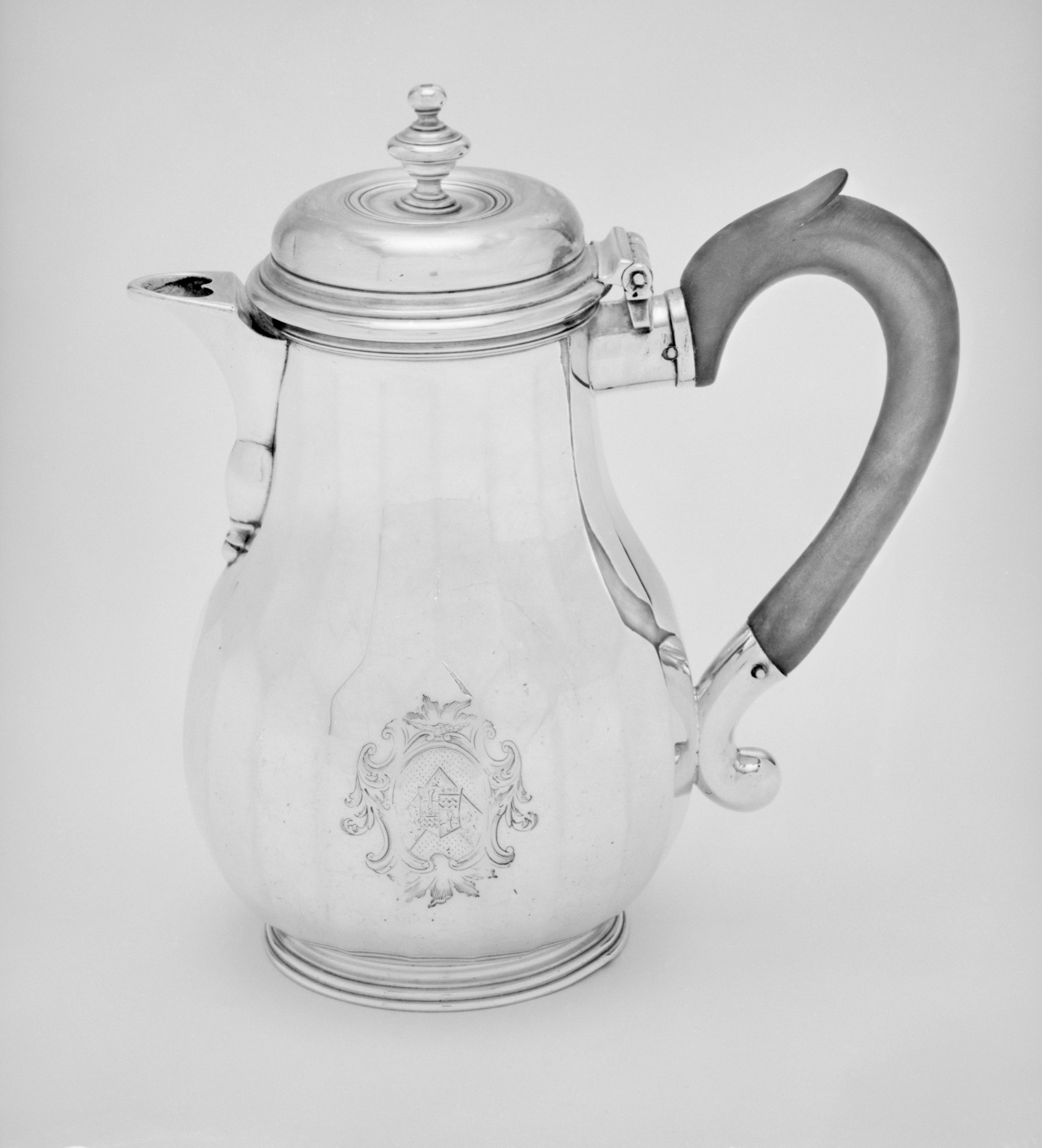
Wood and silver jug with cover, 1730

Alexis Pezé Pilleau (13 January 1696 – buried 16 March 1770) was an 18th-century English silversmith of Huguenot descent.

Pilleau was the fourth son of French Huguenot refugees Alexis Pilleau and Madeleine Pezé. His father's family were established goldsmiths in Le Mans and in London he specialised in gold teeth. Pilleau's great-great-grandfather, also named Alexis, was responsible for the silver and gold reliquary for the Le Mans Cathedral in 1612. He was presumably born in London, where he was baptised at 10 days old at the Church of le Carré and Berwick Street.

In 1720, Pilleau was apprenticed to John (Jean) Chartier, another Huguenot.

By 1732, Pilleau had workshops above the "Golden Cup" on Chandos Street, London. Antique silver historian Arthur Girling Grimwade wrote that, "Pilleau's work, though comparatively rare, is characterised by fine proportion and finish."

Pilleau married Chartier's daughter, Henriette Chartier. They had six sons and two daughters. Pilleau died in 1770 and left an estate at Wigborough, Essex, to his daughter Susanne, who founded the Lying-in-Charity for expecting mothers at Colchester.

He had one surviving son, Isaac, who was an art connoisseur and helped the Earl of Liverpool curate his collection of pictures and engravings. Isaac's descendants included several distinguished military and medical individuals of the nineteenth century. Sir Charles Travis Clay, librarian and antiquarian, was among his prominent descendants, born the grandson of Colonel Henry Pilleau.
