= James Heard Pulman =

English barrister and librarian

James Heard Pulman (1821 – 22 April 1900) was an English barrister and librarian who was the second librarian at the House of Lords Library, serving from 1861–97.

Pulman was born in Westminster, the eldest son of officer-at-arms James Pulman. He was educated at Eton College and Lincoln's Inn. He was called to the bar in 1849.

He was assistant librarian to John Frederic Leary, 1852–61, and succeeded Leary after his death in August 1861.

A barrister by training, Pulman's tenure as Lords librarian was marked by his lack of interest in historical collections. He was notably "reluctant" to acquire any works that were not legal volumes or Parliamentary papers." His assistant librarian, writer William Thoms, the founder of founded Notes and Queries, was much more eager to acquire valuable historical manuscripts, but was discouraged by Pulman. Pulman's reluctance to expand the collection beyond the law and Parliamentary books was so great that in 1875 "he had to be ordered to resume the purchasing of important historical works."

Pulman retired in 1897 and was succeeded by Sandford Arthur Strong. He died in Wandsworth, aged 79.

Government offices
Preceded by John Frederic Leary	House of Lords Librarian; 1861–1897	Succeeded by Sandford Arthur Strong
