= Charles Travis Clay =

English librarian

Sir Charles Travis Clay CB FSA FBA
- Clay in 1950 by Walter Stoneman
- Born: Charles Travis Clay; January 30 July 1885; Rastrick, Yorkshire, England
- Died: 31 January 1978 (aged 92); Little Tew, Oxfordshire, England
- Education: Balliol College, Oxford
- Occupation: Librarian
- Spouse: Hon. Alice Violet Robson (m. 1913; died 1972)
- Children: Rachel Maxwell-Hyslop, Dr Diana Franklin Laurenson and Rosemary Travis Howarth

Sir Charles Travis Clay (30 July 1885 – 31 January 1978) was an English librarian and antiquarian who was the librarian of the House of Lords Library from 1922 to 1956.

== Early life and education ==
Clay was born at Rastrick House in Rastrick, near Halifax, Yorkshire, the younger son of historian and genealogist John William Clay and his wife, Alice Caroline Pilleau. His mother was the daughter of Colonel Henry Pilleau and descended from Pezé Pilleau, the notable Huguenot silversmith. His only brother, Lionel Pilleau Clay, was killed in action in 1918 in the First World War.

Clay was educated at Harrow School, earning a scholarship for mathematics at Balliol College, Oxford in 1904. After gaining only second-class honours in mathematical moderations, he was able to keep his scholarship but read history. Under the tutelage of Henry William Carless Davis and Arthur Lionel Smith, he took first-class honours in modern history in 1908.

== Career ==
Clay became assistant secretary to the Marquess of Crewe, first at the Colonial Office and then at the India Office. After Sir Edmund Gosse retired in 1914, Lord Crewe, at that time Leader of the House of Lords, recommended Clay as an Assistant Librarian at House of Lords Library. Shortly afterward, he was commissioned into the Royal Devon Yeomanry and sent to France. He rose to the rank of major and was twice mentioned in dispatches.

Clay succeeded as House of Lords librarian in 1922, and served approximately three decades in the post while continuing to pursue his passion for genealogy and antiquities, earning a reputation for his expertise in both art and archaeology.

He was studious but very human, had a remarkably accurate memory, and was an historical scholar. His knowledge of art and archaeology was encyclopaedic, and he always paid scrupulous attention to the unexciting but demanding work of classification and administration. Peers placed great reliance on his recommendation of sources of information, and knowledge of parliamentary history, and he was even consulted on the rules of precedence. It was a tribute to his knowledge and judgment when, towards the end of his career... Mr R. A. Butler (now Lord Butler of Saffron Walden) appointed him a member of the reviewing committee on the export of works of art.

— The Times, 1978

From the early 1920s Clay meticulously pursued his interest in the history of Yorkshire and published numerous volumes for the Yorkshire Archaeological and History Society.

Clay was a Fellow of the Society of Antiquaries (FSA) for 65 years and vice-president of the society from 1934 to 1938. He also served as honorary vice-president of the Royal Historical Society. He was a member of the Huguenot Society and the Harleian Society as well as the Roxburgh Club for bibliophiles.

In 1943, Clay was awarded an honorary DLitt [Doctorate of Letters] from the University of Leeds. He was appointed a Companion of the Order of the Bath, civil division, in the 1944 New Year Honours. He was elected a Fellow of the British Academy elected in 1950. He edited multiple volumes of Early Yorkshire Charters during his career.

Following his retirement, Clay was knighted in the 1957 Birthday Honours. There are five portraits of Clay in the National Portrait Gallery, by Walter Stoneman and Walter Bird.

== Personal life ==
In 1913, Clay married Alice Violet Robson (1892–1972), daughter of Liberal MP and Attorney General William Robson, Baron Robson. She was a lifelong Liberal. They had three daughters: Rachel Maxwell-Hyslop (1914–2011), a prominent archaeologist; Dr Diana Franklin Laurenson (1920–1977), who defended her doctoral thesis at the London School of Economics in 1960 and taught at the London Polytechnic; and Rosemary Travis Howarth (1924–2009) who studied and subsequently worked at the Courtauld Institute of Art. All three daughters married and there were eight grandchildren and 14 great-grandchildren.

Clay died in Little Tew, Oxfordshire, in 1978.

Government offices
Preceded by Arthur Butler	House of Lords Librarian; 1922–1956	Succeeded by Sir Christopher Dobson
