= Patrick M. Vollmer =

German-British librarian (born 1969)

Patrick Matthias Vollmer (born 18 August 1969) is a German-British librarian and information professional who has been the librarian of the House of Lords Library since 2016 and director of its Library Services since 2015.

== Biography ==
Vollmer was born 18 August 1969 in Bonn, Germany. He is the son of Dr Rudolf Vollmer and Irene Vollmer née Kirby. He attended Peter Joerres Gymnasium in Ahrweiler, Germany and received his LLB and LLM from the University of Warwick.

He was a subeditor for Halsbury’s Laws of England from 2000 to 2002, when he became a library clerk for the House of Lords. He was promoted to senior library clerk in 2005 and was head of research from 2013 to 2015.

He married Sarah Gaffey in 2003 and they have one daughter.

Government offices
Preceded by Elizabeth Hallam-Smith	House of Lords Librarian; 2016–present	Incumbent
