= Edward Montagu Butler =

English cricketer and schoolmaster

Edward Montagu Butler (3 December 1866 – 11 February 1948) was an English first-class cricketer and schoolmaster.

== Life ==
Butler was born in Harrow-on-the-Hill, Middlesex.

He was educated at Harrow School (of which his father was then headmaster) and at Trinity College, Cambridge (of which his father became Master in 1886), matriculating in 1885, gaining an exhibition, graduating B.A. 1891 (M.A. 1900).

He played two matches for Middlesex in 1885, and earned Cambridge cricket blues in 1888 and 1889. He also represented Cambridge in singles and doubles racquets, and singles tennis, and in the Amateur Championships in racquets he was singles champion in 1889, and doubles champion with Manley Kemp in 1892.

Butler was an assistant master at Harrow from 1891 to 1919.

He died in Rogate, Sussex, aged 81.

== Family ==
Butler was born to a prominent family of academics and athletes, the son of Henry Montagu Butler who, along with his own father, George Butler, was headmaster of Harrow School. His mother, Georgina Isabella Elliot, was the granddaughter of diplomat Hugh Elliot. His younger brother Arthur Hugh Montagu Butler (1873–1943) was House of Lords Librarian. His father remarried Agnata Frances Ramsay (1867–1931) in 1888, who was mother to his younger half-brothers, Sir James Ramsay Montagu Butler (1889–1975) and Sir Nevile Butler.

He was the father of Olympic champion sprinter Guy Montagu Butler.
