= Constance Phillott =

British painter (1842–1931)

- Born: 1842
- Died: 1931 (aged 88–89)

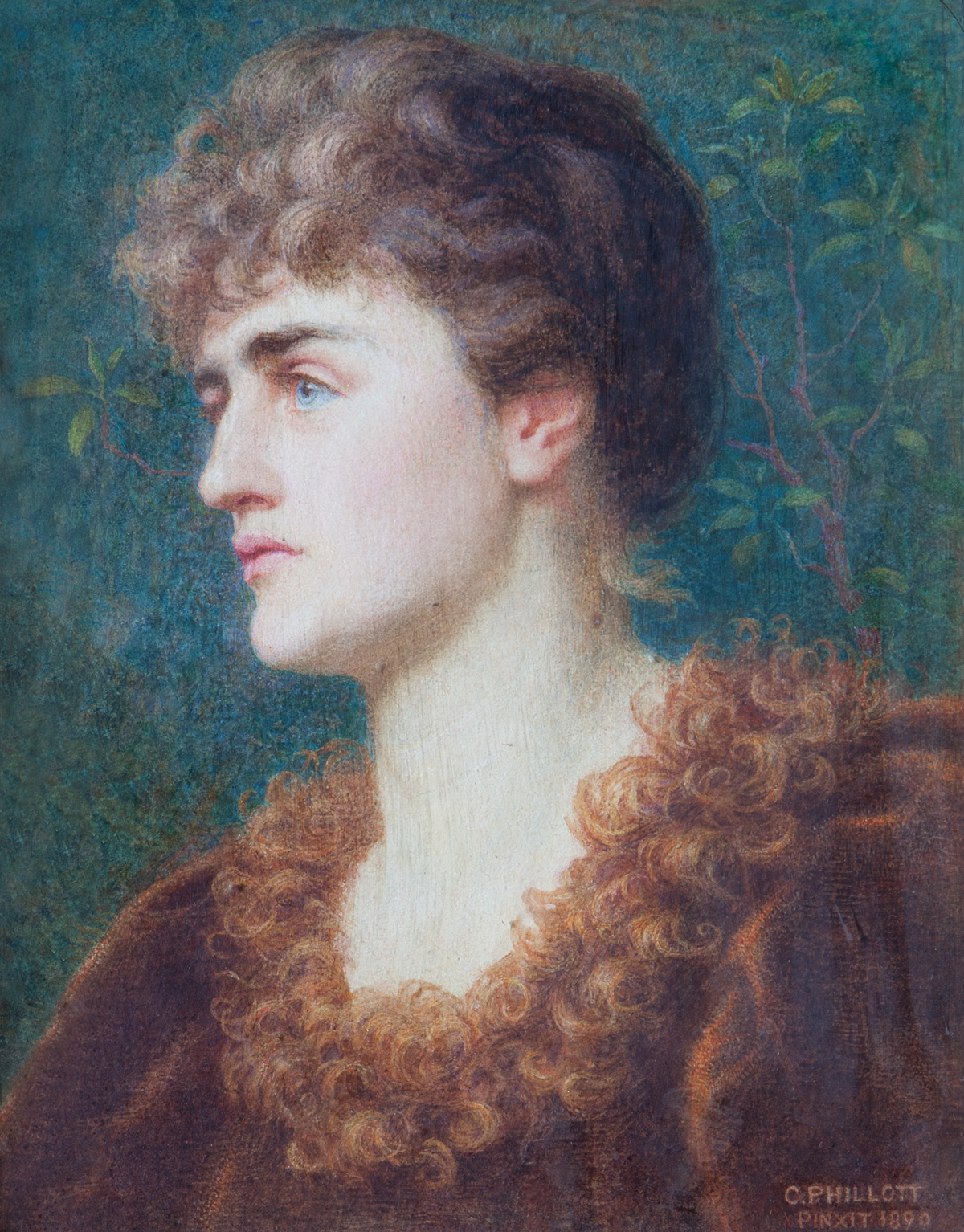
Portrait of Eugénie Sellers Strong, 1890

Constance Phillott (1842 – 30 March 1931) was a British painter.

Phillott was born in Bloomsbury, London. She was the second daughter of Arthur Phillott (1813–1853), a physician, and Frances Caroline Frend (1810–1912). Her mother, who died aged 102, was the daughter of reformer William Frend. She had an older sister, Mary Agnes (1840–1921), who married John Robert Seeley in 1869, and a younger sister, Edith Frend Phillott (1852–1927). She received her education at the Royal Academy schools, along with her cousin William Frend De Morgan and his later wife, Mary Evelyn Pickering. Phillott exhibited with a number of societies, including the Royal Academy and the Society of British Artists, and multiple galleries, such as the Grosvenor Gallery, and she was elected an associate of the Royal Society of Painters in Water Colours. Constance declared her support for female suffrage and joined the London suffrage society in 1889. There is no trace of her exhibiting after the 1880s, and it is unclear what happened to her at that time. However, in 1891, she is listed in the census as a watercolour artist still, visiting a girls' school in Hampstead.

She sometimes inscribed her work with poetry and at one point lived at 259 Stanhope Street, near Regent's Park, in London N.W. Her work The Herdsmen of Admetus was included in the book Women Painters of the World. She is known for landscape, portraits and other subjects.

Phillott never married, but remained living with her mother, who was widowed early, and her unmarried sister Edith, primarily in Hampstead. She died at her home, 6 Downshire Hill, Hampstead, on 30 March 1931, and was buried at St John-at-Hampstead on 2 April that year.

In 1997, her watercolor "Demetriki called Tito", from 1872, was included in the exhibition English Realist Watercolors, 1830–1915 at the Shepherd Gallery.
