= Howard 'Grace' Cup =

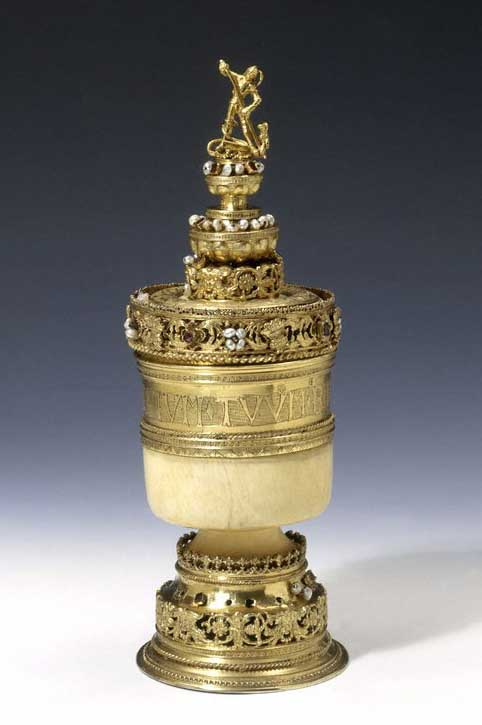
The Howard 'Grace' Cup, 1525-1526 V&A Museum no. M.2680:1, 2-1931

The Howard 'Grace' Cup is an English example of a Grace Cup. It would have been passed around the dinner table after prayers had been said. It is a survivor from the English Tudor Court. The ivory bowl is said to have belonged to Thomas Becket, Archbishop of Canterbury, who was murdered in his cathedral in 1170. Such relics of England's favourite saint were treasured until the English Reformation.

The gilded silver mounts are hallmarked for 1525-1526, and the engraver incorporated the initials of TB as well as a bishop's mitre on them. However, later research has been unable to link the initials with any known bishop in the 1520s so it is believed they may refer to Thomas Becket.

The pomegranate badge of Catherine of Aragon is also featured. The cup was said to have been bequeathed to the Queen by Sir Edward Howard (d. 1513), Lord High Admiral to Henry VIII. The vital role played by prints in the dissemination of Renaissance styles to Northern Europe is revealed in some of the ornamentation on the cup which, like Henry VIII's writing desk, derives from the work of Hans Burgkmair. The cast marks and sheaves taken from an engraving by the artist are the earliest example of Renaissance influence in English goldsmiths' work. After Catherine of Aragon's death in 1536 the cup was returned to the Howard family, who were renowned both as devout Roman Catholics and as art collectors. It descended through successive generations of the family until it was bought by the Victoria and Albert Museum in 1931.

== Bibliography ==
- Jackson, Anna, ed. (2001). V&A: A Hundred Highlights. V&A Publications.
