= Henry Montagu Butler =

English academic and clergyman (1833–1918)

Montagu Butler
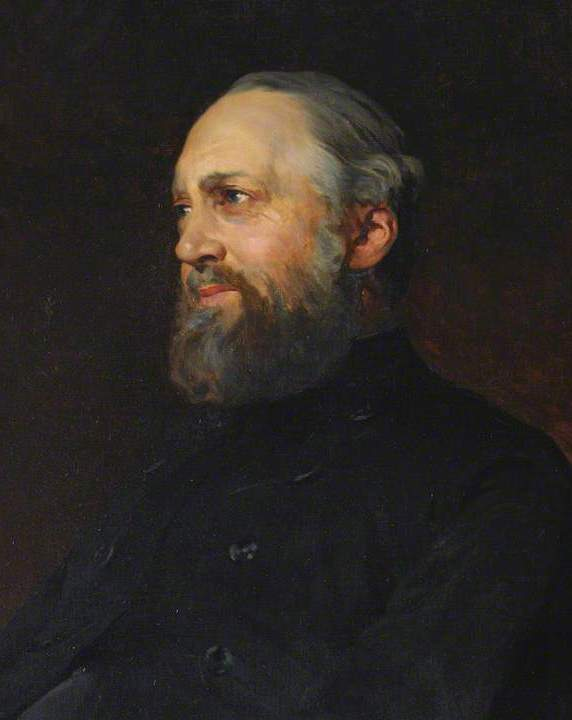
- Born: 2 July 1833; Gayton, Northamptonshire, England
- Died: 14 January 1918 (aged 84); Cambridge, Cambridgeshire, England
- Education: Harrow School; Trinity College, Cambridge
- Occupations: Headmaster, academic
- Spouse(s): Georgina Elliot; Agnata Frances Ramsay
- Children: Edward Montagu Butler; A. H. M. Butler; Sir J. R. M. Butler; Sir Nevile Butler
- Parent: Very Rev. George Butler
- Relatives: George Butler (brother); Josephine Butler (sister-in-law); Montagu C. Butler (cousin); Guy Butler (grandson)

Henry Montagu Butler (2 July 1833 – 14 January 1918) was an English academic and clergyman, who served as headmaster of Harrow School (1860–85), Dean of Gloucester (1885–86) and Master of Trinity College, Cambridge (1886–1918).

== Early life ==
Butler was the fourth son of George Butler, Headmaster of Harrow School and later Dean of Peterborough, and his wife Sarah Maria née Gray.

He was educated at Harrow and Trinity College, Cambridge, matriculating in 1851. At Cambridge he won the Browne Medal in 1853 and 1854, the Camden Medal, and the Porson Prize in 1854, and was President of the Cambridge Union for Michaelmas term 1855. He graduated B.A. as senior classic in 1855, M.A. 1858, D.D. 1865.

Made a Fellow of Trinity in 1855, Butler was a tutor there 1855–1859. He was ordained deacon and priest in 1859.

== Career ==
Butler succeeded Charles Vaughan (priest) as headmaster of Harrow School from 1860 to 1885, following in his father's footsteps. In this capacity he influenced many young people, including Stanley Baldwin (Prime Minister), Lord Davidson (Archbishop of Canterbury), John Galsworthy of the Forsyte Saga, ten bishops including Bishop Gore, and many others who went on to become establishment figures. He is credited with changing Harrow from a traditional seventeenth century institution to a rebuilt and well-equipped contemporary school.

He was appointed Dean of Gloucester in 1885, Master of Trinity College, Cambridge, from 1886 to 1918, and vice chancellor of the university from 1889 to 1890.

A talented and versatile Latinist, Butler achieved fame as one of the most adept British composers of Latin and Greek verse in the 19th and 20th centuries. He wrote one hymn, Lift up your hearts! We lift them, Lord, to thee in 1881. He died in Cambridge on 14 January 1918.

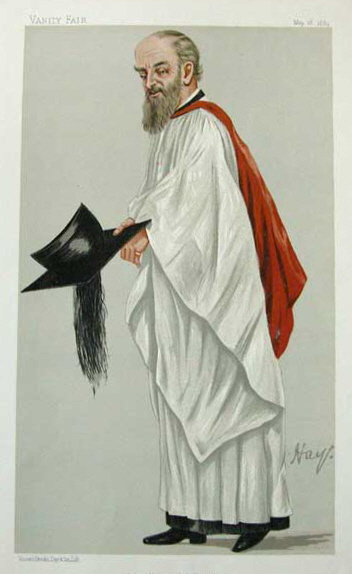
Caricature by Hay in Vanity Fair

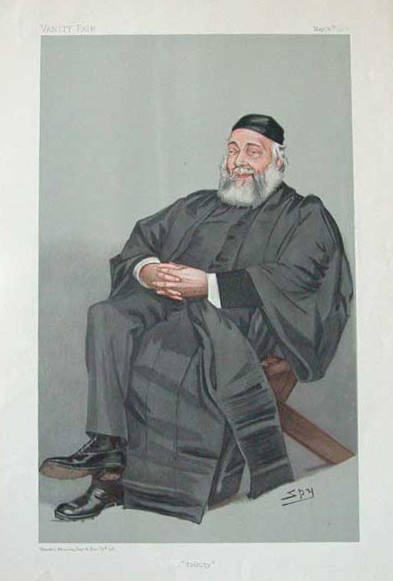
"Trinity". Caricature by Spy published in Vanity Fair in 1903.

== Trivia ==
Shane Leslie described him as "the Master of Trinity, a bland Olympian in a black skull-cap with a white Jovine beard and an untiring flow of the lengthy anecdotes that are told in Heaven after the nectar has gone round twice.”

Butler's desk was donated to Duke Hospital by Dr. William John Dann in March 1938. After it had been moved to storage, circumstances led the school to refinish it and hence to discover the plaque telling of its historical significance.

Henry Montagu Butler was the first cousin once removed to Montagu Christie Butler, with whom he may easily be confused if either is referred to simply as "Montagu Butler". He was also the brother of schoolmaster George Butler, whose wife was the social reformer Josephine Butler, and the great-uncle of Richard Austen 'Rab' Butler, who also became Master of Trinity.

A. C. Benson recounted how Butler fell asleep during a College meeting and awoke with the emphatic observation, "A strong case, tellingly put".

== Family ==
Butler married twice. Firstly, on 19 December 1861, to Georgina Isabella Elliot (1839–1883), with issue:

- Agnes Isabel Butler (1865–1949), married Edmund Whytehead Howson
- Edward Montagu Butler (1866–1948), first-class cricketer and father of Olympic gold medallist Guy Montagu Butler
- Edith Violet Butler (1869–1887)
- Arthur Hugh Montagu Butler (1873–1943), House of Lords Librarian
- Gertrude Maud Butler (1880–1933), married Bernard Morley-Fletcher

Secondly, in August 1888 at St George's, Hanover Square, aged 55, Butler married Agnata Frances Ramsay (1867–1931), a 21-year-old classicist who in 1887 attained the highest marks in the Classical Tripos at Cambridge. They had issue:

- Sir James Ramsay Montagu Butler (1889–1975), politician
- Gordon Kerr Montagu Butler (1891–1916), killed in action in the First World War
- Sir Nevile Montagu Butler (1893–1973), diplomat

== Notes ==
Church of England titles
Preceded by Edward Bickersteth	Dean of Gloucester; 1885–1886	Succeeded by Donald Spence Jones
Academic offices
Preceded by Charles Vaughan	Head Master of Harrow School; 1860–1885	Succeeded by James Welldon
Preceded by William Hepworth Thompson	Master of Trinity College, Cambridge; 1886–1918	Succeeded by J. J. Thomson
Preceded by Charles Edward Searle	Vice-Chancellor of the University of Cambridge; 1889–1890	Succeeded by John Peile
