= Caroline Amy Hutton =

British classical archaeologist

Caroline Amy Hutton (1861 – 6 October 1931) was a British archaeologist known for her work on Greek terracotta figurines. She was a pioneer in the field of Classical archaeology. Having studied Classics at Girton College, she went on to give lectures at the British Museum where she also wrote a book on terracotta statuettes based on the institution’s collections. Hutton held administrative positions both at the British School at Athens and the Society for the Promotion of Hellenic Studies, where she collaborated in the running of the library while editing the Annual of the British School at Athens, becoming the Honorary Secretary of the Society in 1919.

== Biography ==
Hutton was born in New Zealand to Howard Hutton and Emma Kenrick. Her mother's family were well-to-do proprietors of an iron foundry in Denbighshire. This allowed her financial independence that made possible a career path not then ordinarily open to women, though she often had to work unpaid or poorly paid. From 1879 to 1883 she studied Classics at Girton College, Cambridge University, where archaeologist Eugénie Sellers and classical scholar Katharine Jex-Blake were among fellow students who became her friends. For a time after leaving Girton she taught at Allenswood Boarding School, a school for young women.

In 1892 she began to lecture about Greek sculpture and history at the British Museum, where she went on to carry out her own research for many years. With the encouragement of archaeologist Alexander Stuart Murray, who headed the museum's department of Greek and Roman antiquities, Hutton undertook research and restoration work on ceramics from the ancient Egyptian city of Naukratis. This resulted in Hutton's first academic publication, "Inscriptions on Pottery from Naukratis." As with subsequent publications, she used her initials for her author name, publishing as C.A. Hutton.

In the late 1890s, Hutton traveled to Paris and Berlin to study Greek terracotta figurines in local collections. In 1896–97 she had a scholarship to undertake similar research at the British School at Athens, only the second woman (after Sellers) to be allowed to work at the School. This research led to her 1899 book Greek Terracotta Statuettes, which focused on the British Museum collections and was the first book in English to survey the subject, covering the centuries from the Archaic to the Hellenistic periods.

Hutton continued to research and write about Greek antiquities for many years thereafter, though at a slower pace, and devoted more of her energies to editorial and administrative work. From 1906 to 1926, she served as co-editor of the Annual of the British School at Athens, working with archaeologist Cecil Harcourt Smith.

In addition, after joining the London-based Society for the Promotion of Hellenic Studies, Hutton served the society in various administrative capacities for more than two decades. Notably, she was acting librarian from 1891 to 1899 and again during World War I, keeping the Hellenic Society open despite the conflict. In 1927, she published the first article about the Hellenic Society's Wood Collection, an important archive of notebooks and other material related to a Syrian expedition undertaken by Robert Wood, James Dawkins and John Bouverie. She later spent a decade as the society's Honorary Secretary before retiring in 1930 due to poor health.

== Selected publications ==
- Greek Terracotta Statuettes. Macmillan, 1899.
- "Inscriptions on Pottery from Naukratis." The Classical Review, 1893.
- "Votive Reliefs in the Acropolis Museum." The Journal of Hellenic Studies, 1897.
- "A Collection of Sketches by C.R. Cockerell, RA." The Journal of Hellenic Studies, 1909.
- "The Greek Inscriptions at Petworth House." Annual of the British School at Athens, 1916.
- "The Travels of 'Palmyra' Wood in 1750–51." The Journal of Hellenic Studies, 1927.
