= Times Higher Education =

Weekly magazine based in London

- No. 2,048 {[(3_9) May 2012)]}
- Editor: Chris Havergal
- Categories: Higher education
- Frequency: Fortnightly
- First issue: October 15, 1971; 54 years ago (as Times Higher Education Supplement)
- Company: Inflexion Pvt. Equity Partners LLP
- Country: United Kingdom
- Based in: Australia & New Zealand
- Language: English & German
- Website: timeshighereducation.com
- ISSN: 0049-3929

Times Higher Education (THE), formerly The Times Higher Education Supplement (The THES), is a British magazine reporting specifically on news and issues related to higher education.

== Ownership ==
TPG Capital acquired TSL Education from Charterhouse in a £400 million deal in July 2013 and rebranded TSL Education, of which Times Higher Education was a part, as TES Global. The acquisition by TPG marked the third change of ownership in less than a decade for Times Higher Education, which was previously owned by News International before being acquired by Exponent Private Equity in 2005.

In March 2019, private equity group Inflexion Pvt. Equity Partners LLP acquired Times Higher Education from TPG Capital, becoming THE's fourth owners in 15 years. Following the acquisition by the private equity group, Times Higher Education was carved out as an independent entity from TES Global. The investment was made by Inflexion's dedicated mid-market buyout funds.

The exclusive advisor for the acquisition by Inflexion was Houlihan Lokey, an investment company which has previously assisted several private equity groups acquire for-profit educational organisations. Post-acquisition, Houlihan Lokey noted that the existing Times Higher Education team will work to meet the demand for data and branding products, and look at cross-selling to existing clients.

== History ==
From its first issue, on 15 October 1971, until 2008, The Times Higher Education Supplement (The Thes) was published weekly in newspaper format and was born out of its sister paper, the Times Educational Supplement (TES), and affiliated with The Times newspaper.

Its founding editor, Brian MacArthur, recruited a team of talented young reporters to chart the expanding higher education sector, including Peter Hennessy (now Lord Hennessy), David Henke, David Walker, Christopher Hitchens, and Peter Scott, who was appointed editor in 1976. Scott remained editor until 1992, leading a team of journalists that included Robin McKie, John O'Leary (who would later return as editor after a period at The Times), and Peter David. Other staff reporters in this period included Ngaio Crequer and Judith Judd. Brian Morton, Lynne Truss and Olga Wojtas have established careers as writers.

In the 1980s, The Thes pioneered comparisons of the reputations of university departments through peer review conducted by consulting academics in the field under scrutiny. Managed by O'Leary, this become the foundation for the league table of United Kingdom universities that was launched under his stewardship as Education Editor of The Times.

The Thes was a supporter of the then "binary divide" between the established universities and the polytechnics and the links between the latter and the local education authorities, which ended with the Further and Higher Education Act 1992.

The magazine featured a fictional satirical column written by Laurie Taylor, the "Poppletonian", which reflects on life at the fictional Poppleton University.

Under Scott's editorship, it stood apart from other titles in Rupert Murdoch's News International in endorsing the Labour Party at successive General Elections.

In 1992 Scott left for academe and was replaced by Auriol Stevens, who was editor until 2002. Under her editorship The Thes strongly supported the case for undergraduate students to contribute to their higher education through tuition fees.

The Thes was the first of Rupert Murdoch's UK titles to put its text, archive and job ads on line, although the text was at that time behind a subscription wall. Stevens described the move as the "Murdoch empire's canary in the coal mine".

With its elder sister publication, the Times Educational Supplement, it was acquired by venture capital group Exponent in October 2005 for £205m.

On 10 January 2008, it was relaunched as a magazine, published by TES Global. The magazine was edited by John Gill until his promotion to Chief Executive Officer in 2025.

In 2011, Times Higher Education was awarded the titles of "Weekly Business Magazine of the Year" and "Media Business Brand of the Year" by the Professional Publishers Association.

In 2019, it was widely rumoured that Elsevier, who already partners with THE in order to compile their university rankings, was planning to take over Times Higher Education completely.

In August 2020, Times Higher Education announced partnerships with recruitment agency SI-UK and accommodation provider Casita, signalling its entry into the overseas student recruitment and student housing markets.

On 11 September 2020, Netherlands-based Studyportals announced that it had inked an agreement with Times Higher Education, which will see the Times Higher Education website's student visitors directed to the Studyportals student recruitment platform whenever students look into courses run by universities that THE ranks in its World University Rankings.

In 2022, Times Higher Education acquired the Inside Higher Education, an online higher-ed publication company from Quad Partners, a private equity firm.

In 2023, it acquired Poets&Quants, an American graduate business education website.

In 2024, they signed an agreement with the country of Hungary's Culture and Innovation Ministry which oversees Hungarian higher education for THE to "give an accent to Hungary's higher education excellence at an international level." State secretary Balázs Hankó, who oversees higher education, said "the goal was to have a Hungarian university among the world's 100 best by 2030, and at least three among Europe's top 100."

In December 2024, Times Higher Education ceased as a print magazine and is currently an online-only publication.

== University rankings ==
Times Higher Education became known for publishing the annual Times Higher Education–QS World University Rankings, which first appeared in November 2004. On 30 October 2009 Times Higher Education broke with Quacquarelli Symonds, then its partner in compiling the Rankings, and signed an agreement with Thomson Reuters to provide the data instead. The magazine developed a new methodology in consultation with its readers and its editorial board and the results were published annually from autumn 2010 to 2013, when THE signed a new deal with Elsevier.

As well as its THE World University Rankings, Times Higher Education also publishes a number of other rankings:

Launch year	Ranking
2019	Impact Rankings
2017	Japan University Rankings
2017	WSJ/THE College Rankings
2016	Latin America University Rankings
2014	Emerging Economies University Rankings
2013	Asia University Rankings
2012	Young University Rankings
2011	World Reputation Rankings
2011	World University Rankings

== Events ==
Times Higher Education runs a series of summits, forums and symposiums throughout the year. Chaired by THE's editorial journalists, these events bring together global leaders and influencers from across academic, government and industry to debate, discuss and drive forward the future of higher education governance, innovation and research.

== Awards ==
The magazine runs two sets of awards annually, the "Times Higher Education Awards", launched in 2007, and the "Times Higher Education Awards Asia", launched in 2019. The "Times Higher Education Leadership and Management Awards" (Thelmas) ran from 2011 to 2018..

THE Awards winner of "University of the Year"
Year	University
2025	Teesside University
2024	Ulster University
2023	Anglia Ruskin University
2022	University of Northumbria
2021	Cardiff Metropolitan University
2020	University of Glasgow
2019	University of Strathclyde
2018	University of Essex
2017	Nottingham Trent University
2016	London School of Hygiene and Tropical Medicine
2015	Coventry University
2014	Edge Hill University
2013	University of Huddersfield
2012	University of Strathclyde
2011	University of Sheffield
2010	University of York
2009	Teesside University
2008	University of Leicester
2007	Exeter University
