= House of Commons Information Office =

The House of Commons Enquiry Service, formerly known as the House of Commons Information Office, is a section within the Department of Information Services of the House of Commons. The chief role of the office is to provide the public with information regarding the work, history and membership of the House of Commons of the United Kingdom.

== History ==
The Office was set up in 1978 by Commons Librarian David Menhennet, following a recommendation by the Services Committee in their report Services for the Public (July 1977). The Committee stated that there was "a need for the House to ensure that the public is well informed about its work," and that a "small information office be created within the library...dealing with enquiries from the public."

The Office was established on 1 June 1978 and was originally known as The Public Information Office. It evolved into a bigger section in order to cope with the volume of calls it received. By 1982 the Office was responding to more than 50,000 enquiries annually. This figure rose to 69,000 in 1985 and was up to 95,000 in 1990. It was also one of the first sections to pioneer the use of computers and electronic publication in the House of Commons with the use of Viewdata.

In 2015, the House of Commons Information Office became the House of Commons Enquiry Service.

== Role of the Commons Enquiry Service ==
The Service's original aims have changed little in its 45-year history and is still charged with "Promoting public knowledge and understanding of the work and role of Parliament." The Enquiry Service answers questions from the public on all aspects of the work, history and membership of the House of Commons. Its means of disseminating information have changed somewhat over time and now puts a greater emphasis on online resources such as the Parliament website and social media.
