= Eugénie Sellers Strong =

British archaeologist and art historian

Eugenie Sellers Strong
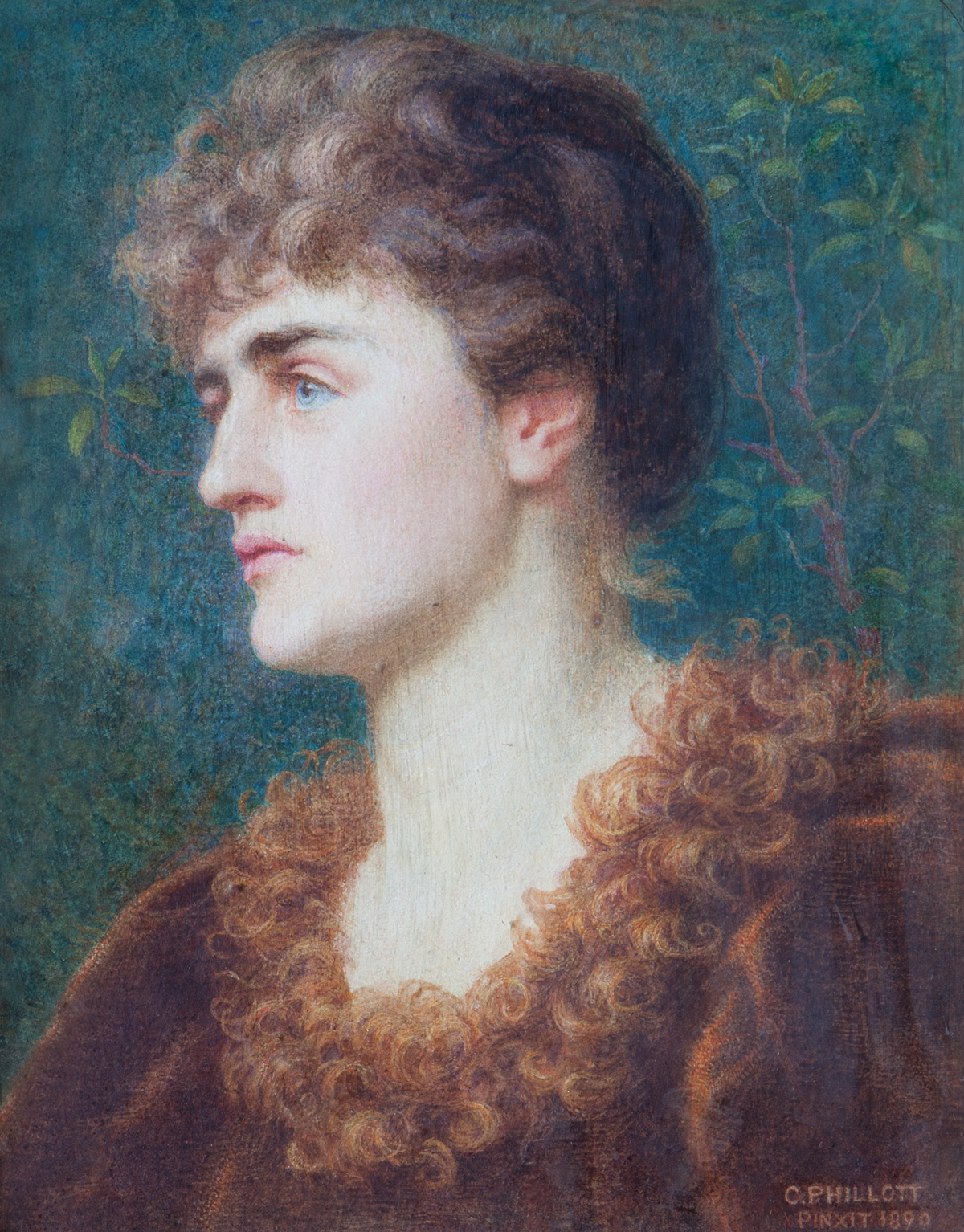
- Portrait 1890 by Constance Phillott, Girton College collection
- Born: Eugenie Sellers; 25 March 1860; London
- Died: 16 September 1943 (aged 83); Rome, Italy
- Resting place: Campo Verano cemetery in Rome
- Education: Girton College, Cambridge
- Occupations: Art Historian, Classical Scholar and Archaeologist
- Employer(s): The Duke of Devonshire at Chatsworth House and the British School at Rome
- Known for: British School at Rome
- Spouse: Sandford Arthur Strong (married 1897 to his death in 1904)

Eugénie Sellers Strong CBE (née Sellers; 25 March 1860 – 16 September 1943) was a British archaeologist and art historian. She was assistant director of the British School at Rome from 1909 to 1925. After studying at Girton College, Cambridge, in 1890 she became the first female student admitted to the British School at Athens; she continued art historical studies in Germany under Adolf Furtwängler. In 1897 she married art historian Sandford Arthur Strong. She contributed to the catalogue of the 1903 Burlington Fine Arts Club "Greek Art" Exhibition, and wrote several books on classical art and sculpture.

== Early life ==
Eugénie Sellers was born in London on 25 March 1860 to Fredrick William Sellers, a wine merchant, and his wife Anna (née Oates). Her French mother was of aristocratic descent (her maternal great-grandfather was the baron du Cluseau) and Eugénie was baptized in the church of St Roch in Paris. She had one sister, Charlotte, eight years younger than herself. Though her family lived primarily in London, they travelled extensively in Europe and she first attended school with Jesuit fathers in Valladolid, Spain. She subsequently attended a convent school at Dourdan in France, leaving in 1877 to travel with her family in Italy and Greece.

Both of her parents had died before Sellers matriculated at Girton College, Cambridge in 1879, where she read for the Classical Tripos. She was permitted to take the Tripos, but at this time, Cambridge degrees were not awarded to women. She became one of the Steamboat ladies awarded her degree through Trinity College Dublin.

== Academic career ==
On leaving Cambridge, Sellers took up a teaching post at St Leonards School in St Andrews, Scotland and a year later moved on to London, where she studied under Sir Charles Newton at the British Museum. The faculty at the University of St Andrews awarded her an honorary degree after publication of her first book. She was the first female student admitted to the British School at Athens, studying there in 1890–91 (the second was her friend Caroline Amy Hutton). Her translation of an account of the excavation of Troy, from the German version of Carl Schuchhardt, was published in English in 1891. She continued art historical studies in Munich under Adolf Furtwängler and Ludwig Traube.

In 1897 Sellers married art historian Sandford Arthur Strong. Her husband was librarian and curator for the Duke of Devonshire at Chatsworth House from 1895. They had no children. After her husband died in 1904, Strong continued in his post at Chatsworth until the death of the 8th Duke of Devonshire in 1908.

In 1906 she was appointed a corresponding member of the Imperial German Archaeological Institute (Kaiserlich-Deutsches Archäologisches Institut).

Strong contributed to the catalogue of the 1903 Burlington Fine Arts Club "Greek Art" Exhibition, and wrote several books on classical art and sculpture. She wrote two chapters for the Cambridge Ancient History, on "The art of the Roman republic" and "The art of the Augustan age".

Strong became a life research fellow at Girton College in 1910. She was assistant director of the British School at Rome from 1909 to 1925. She continued to live at a flat on the via Balbo, near the Basilica of Santa Maria Maggiore in Rome, until her death in 1943, leaving an unpublished manuscript on the history of the Vatican Palace. She died in a nursing home, and was buried in the Campo Verano cemetery in Rome.

In 1920, Strong became the first woman to give the prestigious Rhind Lectures at the Society of Antiquaries of Scotland, on the topic of 'Painting in the Roman Empire (from the last century of the Republic to about 800 AD)'. She subsequently became the first female Honorary Fellow of the Society in 1923.

In England, Strong became a Commander of the Order of the British Empire in 1927, and the British Academy awarded her its Serena medal for Italian studies in 1938.

In Italy, Strong was elected as a member of the Lincean Academy, the Pontifical Academy of Archaeology, and the Society of the Arcadians. She supported the archaeological policies of supporters of Benito Mussolini, and was awarded the gold medal of the city of Rome in 1938.

== Collections ==
University College London Special Collections holds correspondence from Sellers and her husband Sandford Arthur Strong to Dr Williamson, written between 1898 and 1933.

== Selected works ==
All works were authored by Eugénie Sellers Strong unless otherwise noted.

- (1895) Masterpieces of Greek Sculpture: A Series of Essays on the History of Art Adolf Furtwängler, Eugenie Strong (editor and translator) OCLC 862147616 (a translation by Strong of Furtwängler's Meisterwerke der griechischen Plastik)
- (1907) Roman Sculpture from Augustus to Constantine OCLC 162432
- (1915) Apotheosis and after life: three lectures on certain phases of art and religion in the Roman Empire OCLC 3520485
- (1929) Art in Ancient Rome (Ars una: species mille. General history of art) OCLC 5886932

== Bibliography ==
- Dyson, S. L. (2004). Eugénie Sellers Strong: Portrait of an Archaeologist. OCLC 52531896.
- Scott Thomson, G. (1949). Mrs. Arthur Strong: A Memoir. OCLC 491749363.
- "Strong, Eugénie Sellers". Dictionary of Art Historians. 29 March 2024.
