= Grace Cup =

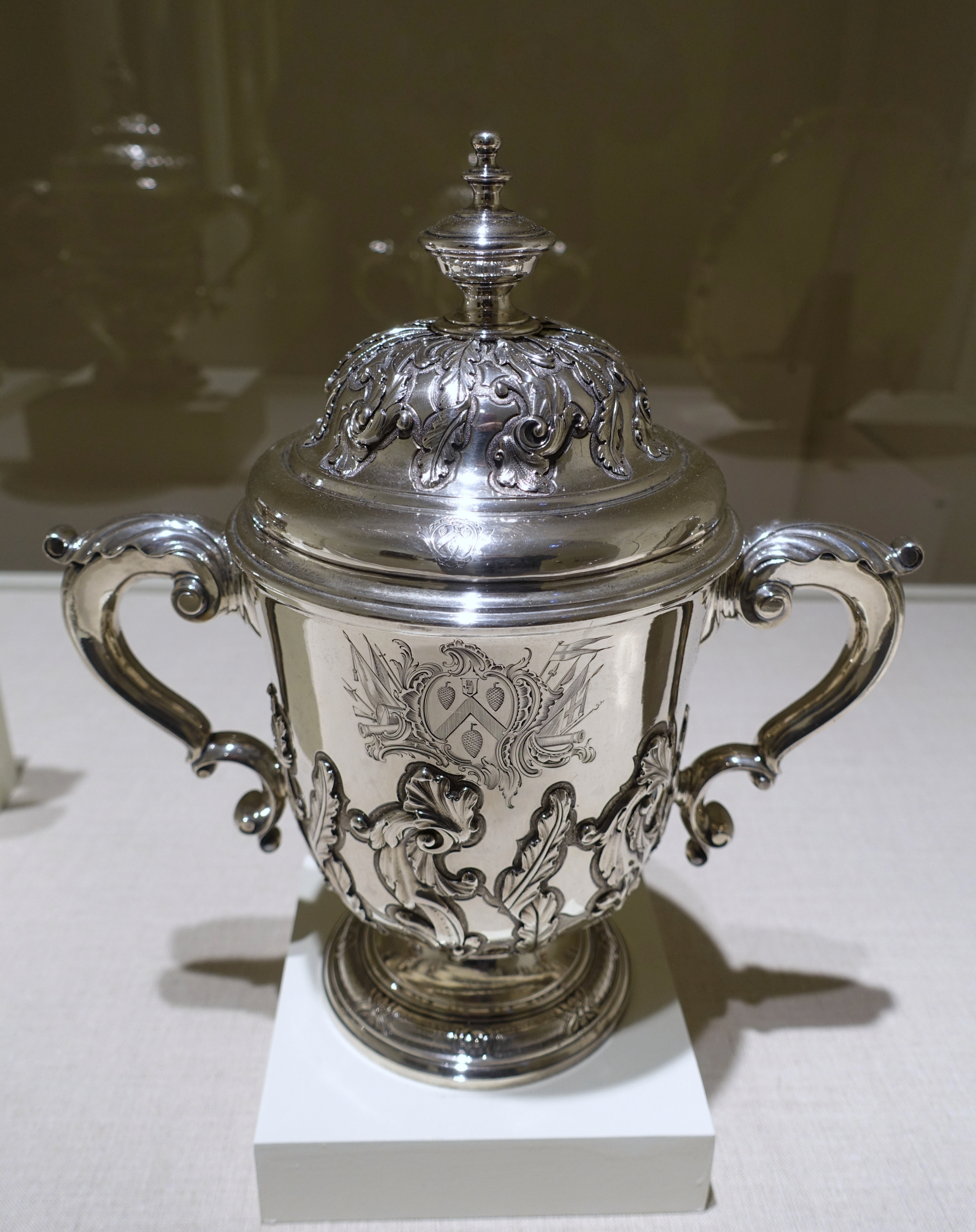
Grace Cup commemorating William Pepperrell's leadership in the Siege of Louisbourg (1745), by Pezé Pilleau, England, c. 1740–5.

A grace cup (or loving cup) is a silver bowl or tankard with two handles that was traditionally passed round the table after grace at banquets.

According to Brewer's Dictionary of Phrase and Fable, the Grace Cup is still seen at the Lord Mayor's feasts, at College, and occasionally in private banquets. Oriel College, Oxford possesses Sanford and Heywood grace cups, dated 1654-55 and 1669–70 in its Buttery Plate collection. Nearby Balliol College also makes reference to the use of a Grace Cup which was discontinued in the early-20th century.

'Grace' cups were passed round when a traditional grace (a prayer of thanksgiving) was said to give thanks for the food eaten. Robert Burton, in his Anatomy of Melancholy (1621) described their use as "a corollary to conclude the feast and continue their mirth, a grace cup came in to cheer their hearts and they drank healths to one another again and again".

A good example is the Howard 'Grace' Cup.

== Usage ==
The proper way of drinking the cup observed at the Lord Mayor's banquet or City companies' is to have a silver bowl with two handles and a napkin. Two persons stand up, one to drink and the other to defend the drinker. Having taken his draught, he wipes the cup with the napkin, and passes it to his "defender," when the next person rises to defend the new drinker. And so on to the end.
