= Elizabeth Hallam Smith =

English historian

Elizabeth Hallam Smith CB FSA FRHistS
- Born: Elizabeth Mary Hallam; 5 November 1950 (age 76); Midsomer Norton, Somerset, England
- Spouse: Terence Smith (m. 1975–2004)
- Children: 2

Academic background
- Education: University of London

Academic work
- Discipline: History
- Sub-discipline: Middle Ages; Political history; Social history; History of Christianity
- Institutions: Public Record Office; The National Archives; House of Lords Library

Elizabeth Mary Hallam Smith (née Hallam; born 5 November 1950) is an English historian and information professional who was the librarian of the House of Lords Library from 2006 to 2016. She was the first woman to hold the post as well as the first to hold the post in conjunction with Director of Information Services.

== Early life and education ==
Hallam Smith was born in Midsomer Norton, Somerset, the daughter of Edwin William Lewis Hallam and Barbara Mary Anthony Hallam.

She earned a BA (Hons) and Ph.D. at the University of London.

== Career ==
Hallam Smith began her career at the Public Record Office (which became The National Archives in 2003), serving as an Assistant Keeper 1976–93, Director of Public Services 1993–2004, and Director of National Advisory and Public Services 2004–2006. In 2006 she joined the Parliamentary Library.

She was appointed a Companion of the Order of the Bath in the civilian division (CB) in the 2017 New Year Honours, for services to parliament and national heritage. She is an Honorary Research Fellow at the University of East Anglia and the University of York. From 2021 to 2024 she served as a Vice President of the Society of Antiquaries of London.

== Personal life ==
Hallam Smith was married to Terence Stephen Smith from 1975 to 2004. They have one son and one daughter.

== Publications ==
- Hallam, Elizabeth M. (1980). Capetian France 987–1328. London: Longman. ISBN 0582489091. (second edition 2001)
- Hallam, Elizabeth M. (1984). The Itinerary of Edward II and his Household, 1307–1328. List & Index Society. Vol. 211. London: List & Index Society.
- Hallam, Elizabeth M. (1986). Domesday Book through Nine Centuries. London: Thames & Hudson. ISBN 0500250979.
- Hallam, Elizabeth M. (1994). Saints: Over 150 patron saints for today. London: Weidenfeld and Nicolson. ISBN 0297833731.
- Hallam, Elizabeth M. (1996). The Chronicles of the Wars of the Roses. Godalming: Bramley. ISBN 1858335884.
- Hallam, Elizabeth M. (2000). Chronicles of the Age of Chivalry: the Plantagenet dynasty from 1216 to 1377: Henry III and the three Edwards, the era of the Black Prince and the Black Death. London: Salamander. ISBN 1840652748.
- Hallam, Elizabeth M.; Bates, David, eds. (2001). Domesday Book. Stroud: Tempus. ISBN 0752419730.
- Takayanagi, Mari; Hallam, Elizabeth M. (2023). Necessary Women: The Untold Story of Parliament's Working Women. ISBN 978-1803990156.

== See also ==
- Carla Hayden, first female Librarian of Congress

Government offices
| Preceded by David Lewis Jones | House of Lords Librarian and Director of Information Services; 2006–2015 | Succeeded by Patrick M. Vollmer |
