= John O'Leary (journalist) =

British journalist

John O'Leary is a British journalist, formerly editor of the Times Higher Education Supplement and previously Education Editor of The Times. He is also the author of the Times Good University Guide since 2005. At Sheffield University he was both President of the students' union and editor of the university newspaper Darts (now known as Forge Today).

Since 2010, John O'Leary has worked as a member of the Executive Advisory Board of QS Quacquarelli Symonds, compilers of the QS World University Rankings.
