= Sandford Arthur Strong =

English orientalist, art historian and librarian

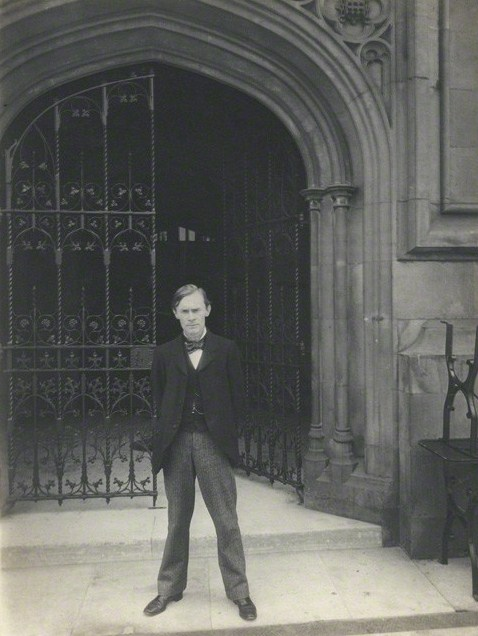
- Sandford Arthur Strong, 1897 photograph
- Born: 10 April 1863; Kensington, London, England
- Died: 18 January 1904 (aged 40); Marylebone, London
- Education: King's College London
- Alma mater: St John's College, Cambridge
- Occupation: Librarian

Sandford Arthur Strong (10 April 1863 – 18 January 1904) was an English orientalist, art historian and librarian.

== Life ==
Born in Kensington in 1863, Strong was the second son of Thomas Banks Strong of the War Office, and his wife, Anna Lawson; his elder brother was Thomas Banks Strong. In 1877 he entered St Paul's School, London as a foundation scholar, but remained there for little more than a year. His next two years were passed as a clerk at Lloyd's, though during this time he also attended classes at King's College London. As a boy he was taught drawing by Albert Varley, who gave him a copy of Matthew Pilkington's Dictionary of Painters, and he frequented the National Gallery. In 1881 Strong matriculated with a Hutchinson studentship at St John's College, Cambridge. He graduated in 1884, with a third class in Part I of the classical tripos, being placed in the second class in Part II the following year. He proceeded M.A. in 1890.

On the recommendation of Edward Byles Cowell, Strong worked on Sanskrit with Cecil Bendall, but discouraged at Cambridge, he moved to Oxford towards the end of 1885. There he was subkeeper and librarian of the Indian Institute, and befriended Max Müller, Archibald Henry Sayce, and Adolf Neubauer. Neubauer advised him to visit the continent, and gave him letters of introduction to Ernest Renan and James Darmesteter at Paris; he also studied with Eberhard Schrader in Berlin. Strong on his return to England found recognition and employment slow in coming, and he failed in his candidature for the chair of Arabic at Cambridge vacant by the death of Robertson Smith in 1894. He was appointed in 1895 professor of Arabic at University College London, an almost nominal post. At this period he taught Persian to Gertrude Bell.

Sidney Colvin introduced Strong to the Duke of Devonshire, who was then in need of a librarian to succeed Sir James Lacaita. At Chatsworth House from 1895, he concentrated on its works of art, and was invited to other collections: the Duke of Portland's at Welbeck Abbey, where he also acted for a time as librarian, the Earl of Pembroke's at Wilton House, and Lord Wantage's at Lockinge.

In 1897, Strong was also appointed librarian at the House of Lords. After a lingering illness, he died in London on 18 January 1904, and was buried in Brompton cemetery. The Arthur Strong Oriental Library at University College London was formed around his books, given by his widow.

== Works ==
Strong's major oriental publications were his editions of the Maha-Bodhi-Vamsa for the Pali Text Society (1891), and of the Futah al-Habashah or "Conquest of Abyssinia" (1894) (see Abyssinian–Adal war) for the Royal Asiatic Society's monographs. At his death he was engaged on the Arabic text of Ibn Arabshah's History of Yakmak, Sultan of Egypt, on Jaqmaq, the first part of which appeared in the Journal of the Royal Asiatic Society for 1904. As well as Sanskrit and Arabic, Strong studied Pali, Persian and Assyrian hieroglyphics and Chinese; on all these he wrote in learned publications, and he also contributed reviews to the Athenæum and The Academy.

Among Strong's art publications the main ones were:

- Reproductions of Drawings by the Old Masters in the Collection of the Earl of Pembroke and Montgomery at Wilton House, 1900.
- Preface to Plates of National Gallery Pictures, 1901, publishers Franz Hanfstaengl.
- Masterpieces of the Duke of Devonshire's Collection of Pictures, 1901.
- Reproductions of Drawings by the Old Masters at Chatsworth, 1902.
- Catalogue of Letters and other Historical Documents in the Library of Welbeck, 1903.

At the House of Lords, Strong compiled two catalogues, one of the general library and one of the law books.

== Personal life ==
In 1897, Strong married archaeologist Eugénie Sellers, who survived him. There were no children of the marriage.

Strong fell ill in the spring of 1903. Thought to be recovering, he died suddenly in January 1904 aged 40.

== Collections ==
University College London Special Collections holds correspondence from Strong and Sellers to Dr Williamson, written between 1898 and 1933.

Government offices
Preceded by James Heard Pulman	House of Lords Librarian; 1897–1904	Succeeded by Sir Edmund Gosse
