= Christopher Dobson (librarian) =

English librarian

Christopher Selby Austin Dobson CBE (25 August 1916 – 22 December 2005) was an English librarian who was the librarian of the House of Lords Library from 1956 to 1977.

== Early life and education ==
Dobson was born in 1916 in Isleworth to Alban Tabor Austin Dobson (1885–1962), a civil servant, and Katharine Jean Selby Dobson. His father managed the literary estate of his own father, the poet and essayist Austin Dobson.

Dobson grew up in Ealing. He was educated at Clifton College in Bristol and Emmanuel College, Cambridge.

During the Second World War, he served in The Middlesex Regiment and was mentioned in dispatches, rising to the rank of lieutenant.

== Career ==
In 1947, Dobson became assistant to House of Lords Library librarian Charles Travis Clay, who had been in the post since 1914.

Under Clay's guidance, Dobson compiled an edition of the Oxfordshire Protestation Returns 1641–1642, published in 1955, and organised the legal collections. However, Dobson lacked passion for statistics and historical research, far preferring the literary world.

Following Clay's retirement in 1956, Dobson succeeded him and maintained the library largely as his predecessors had, with the library acquiring about 250 titles per year. At this time, there was little impetus for modernisation of library standards. Dobson's main interest was in the acquisition of rare and historical volumes, and grew the library's collection of works from the reigns of Henry VIII through William and Mary.

In 1960, he and Earl Spencer edited Letters of David Garrick and Georgiana Countess Spencer, 1759–1779.

He was described in The Times as:

A bespectacled figure, with an air of gentle inquiry, Dobson always maintained the tradition that the Librarian should sit at a desk in the library rather than retreat to the office provided for his use. He was an old-fashioned bibliophile, and a number of books in the library contain his inscriptions explaining why and where he bought the work and for how much. He had a genuine kindness and was much liked by all who knew him — members and colleagues alike.

— The Times, 2006

He retired in 1977 as the need for drastic change became apparent, owing to technology advances and the growing numbers of life peers who had larger research demands than their hereditary counterparts. He was succeeded by Roger Morgan, who saw the library through a period of modern transformation of increasing digitisation, from 1977 to 1991.

In 1964, he became a member of the Roxburghe Club for bibliophiles. He had a considerable private collection of books and was an enthusiast of Victorian bindings.

Dobson was appointed a Commander of the Order of the British Empire (CBE) in the 1976 New Year Honours.

== Personal life ==
In 1941, he married Helen Broughton Turner, and had a son and a daughter. He died in December 2005 in Cambridge, Cambridgeshire.

Government offices
Preceded by Charles Travis Clay	House of Lords Librarian; 1956–1977	Succeeded by Roger Morgan
