= House of Lords Library =

United Kingdom parliamentary library

Coordinates: 51.4986°N 0.1243°W

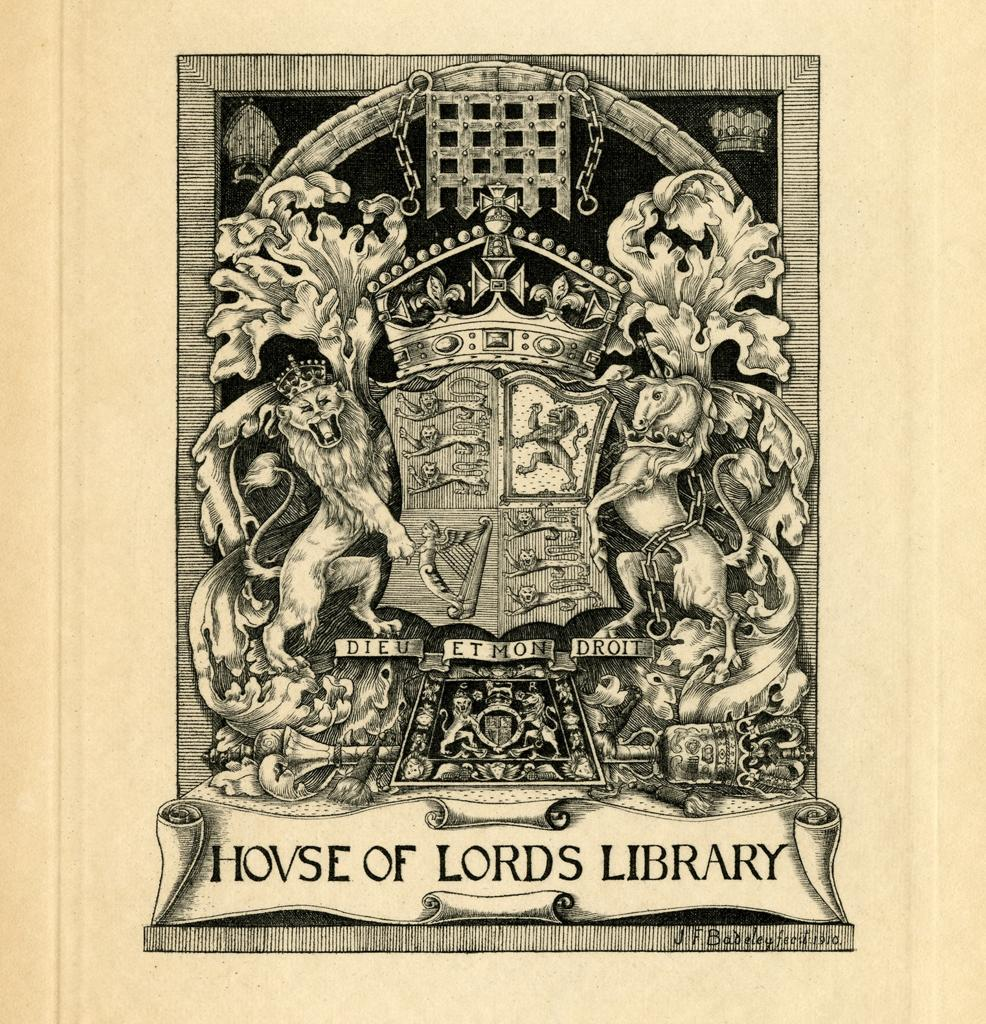
A bookplate from the House of Lords Library

The House of Lords Library is the library and information resource of the House of Lords, the upper house of the Parliament of the United Kingdom. It provides Members of the House and their staff with books, Parliamentary material and reference and research services.

== History ==
=== Birth, 1826–1856 ===
The Library of the House of Lords came into existence in 1826, following a Select Committee's recommendation that the Clerk Assistant of the House should provide "such a collection of English law books as, in his experience, he may consider useful to the House for reference", together with "certain other books according to a list prepared for that purpose by this Committee". One of the clerks of the House, John Frederic Leary, was appointed as the first Librarian, and the architect Sir John Soane prepared a room in the Palace of Westminster to house the new Library, which was ready by the end of 1826. Books owned by the offices of the House were placed in the Library, together with the new books that were bought to meet the Select Committee's recommendation. Once the Library had opened, Leary made a list of the modest amount of stock, the vast majority of which consisted of law books, together with volumes of Hansard and various reference works. Leary was not allowed to buy any more new stock until 1828, although the previous year the third Earl of Rosslyn became the first member of the House to donate books to the Library, a set of House of Lords cases from the early eighteenth century.

Over the next few years the Library grew steadily, although the focus remained firmly on the collection of legal and Parliamentary material. By 1831, the original Library room had become so overcrowded with material that a second room was added to create more space; within another three years this room too was becoming very full. Early in 1834, as space was once again becoming a serious problem, the French Chamber of Peers offered the Library around 1,800 books including parliamentary works, memoirs and histories, in exchange for publications of the British Parliament. The offer of this gift caused consternation, as the Library simply did not have room for it, and Sir Robert Smirke was duly ordered to fit up an additional room as a receptacle for Library stock, while Leary succeeded in delaying the arrival of the French gift. Then, on 16 October 1834, a great fire destroyed most of the old Palace of Westminster. The Library survived the conflagration, but its threatened books were nevertheless evacuated, passed along a file of soldiers, and taken to the safety of nearby St Margaret's Church and the houses of clerks who lived close by. The Library continued to occupy its old premises in the wake of the fire, although they were now a temporary home until the new Palace had been constructed. Space also had to be found for the French gift, which finally arrived in 1836. Seemingly overwhelmed by the arrival of so many new books, Leary managed to get his brother James appointed as Assistant Librarian, in order to give him a helping hand.

More than a decade would pass before the Library moved into its new home, during which time the Robing Room of the Lords Spiritual was turned into an additional Library room. The purchase of books declined, not helped by an 1842 resolution of the House that forbade the Librarian from buying any new material without the written order of three members of the Library Committee. In the meantime, the construction of Charles Barry's new Palace of Westminster had begun, and in 1845 Barry set out his plans for the new Lords Library. They were accepted immediately, and the riverside suite of four rooms that is still in use today was completed by 1848. The books were moved in during the autumn of that year, and shortly afterwards the Library's stock was swollen by the addition of books from the old Irish House of Lords, including books on Irish history. In 1851, it was decided that the original death warrant of King Charles I should be deposited in the Library, in order to give it greater protection; it would remain there until the late 1970s.

=== 1856–1904 ===
A major addition to the collection occurred in 1856, when the widow of a former Lord Chancellor, Lord Truro, bequeathed the Library her husband's huge collection of 2,896 law books, together with a bust of him sculpted by Henry Weekes. The collection was kept together, as Lady Truro had requested, and both the books and the bust were placed in the northernmost room of the Library suite, which is now known as the Truro Room. The bust remains in the room today, but in the late 1970s the collection was moved out and placed in lockable cupboards on the first floor of the Palace, in what is now known as the Truro Corridor. Another former Lord Chancellor, Lord Brougham, also took a great interest around this time in enriching the Library's law collection, and another of the rooms in the main suite, which contains the bulk of the Library's law stock, is now named after him.

Leary died in 1861, and was succeeded as Librarian by barrister James Heard Pulman, who would occupy the office until 1897. Pulman's long tenure was a fairly quiet one for the Library, as he was reluctant to acquire any works that were not law books or Parliamentary papers. One of his Assistant Librarians, William Thoms, did show more initiative and during the 1860s collected a number of valuable historical works. Thoms was a lover of books and founded Notes and Queries, but his attempts to broaden the scope of the Library's collection were discouraged after a few years. Pulman seems to have been so uninterested in expanding the collection beyond the legal and Parliamentary that in 1875 he had to be ordered to resume the purchasing of important historical works.

One notable event in the late nineteenth century was the introduction of electricity to the Library, in about 1893. This replaced gas lighting, which had been installed in the Library at Charles Barry's insistence when it was first constructed; the use of gas had inflicted severe damage to books bound in leather, which was not fully repaired until the 1980s. In 1897, the Library made its first major acquisition for many years with the purchase of about two thousand tracts on Irish affairs, that had once belonged to Sir Robert Peel. These "Peel Tracts" remain in the Library to the present day, and are a valuable source for Irish history in the years leading up to the Union with Great Britain in 1801.

Pulman's retirement in 1897 saw Sandford Arthur Strong take over as Librarian. An art historian and professor of Arabic, Strong was a livelier personality than his predecessor and compiled a new catalogue of the Library's law books. He also oversaw the 1899 bequest to the Library by Sir William Frazer of a large and valuable collection of Gillray political cartoons, which again have remained in the Library ever since. However, Strong's time as Librarian was cut short in 1904, when his poor health brought about his death at the age of forty.

=== 1904–1922 ===
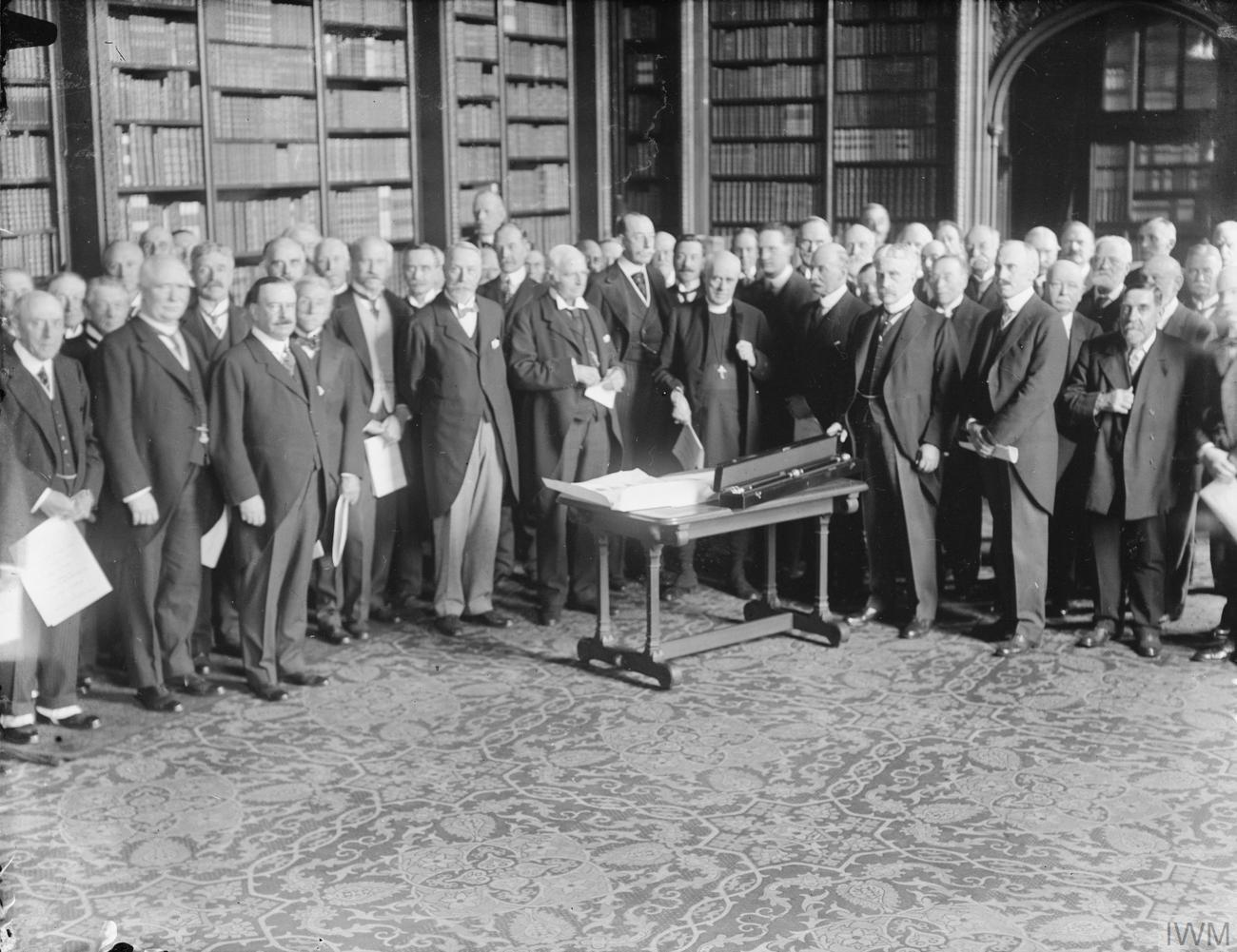
The replacement black rod being presented to Robert Laird Borden in the House of Lords Library, 21 June 1918

Strong's successor was Edmund Gosse, the well-known literary critic and bibliophile, and during his decade in charge the Library stock underwent something of a transformation. Gosse thoroughly enjoyed his time as Librarian, as the post gave him the perfect means to pursue his own interests. He purchased books covering a much wider range of subject matter than any of his predecessors, acquiring many works of English and French literature and history. He also bought Greek and Latin works, and had the Library's collection of English Civil War-era pamphlets lavishly bound together. Most importantly, he compiled the first proper printed catalogue of the Library's non-legal works, which was published in 1908.

Gosse retired in 1914, and it was his successor Arthur Butler who took the Library through the years of the First World War, when he had to manage without his Assistant Librarian Charles Travis Clay, who was away fighting on the Western Front. After the War, Butler and Clay began the process of creating a new card catalogue for the law books, intended to replace Sandford Strong's earlier catalogue. This project had not advanced far when Butler was forced to resign on health grounds in 1922; Clay succeeded him as Librarian, and would remain in the post for more than three decades.

=== 1922–1956 ===
Charles Travis Clay, Librarian from 1922, was a keen historian, well respected for his work in editing medieval charters, and he was eventually elected a Fellow of the British Academy. From the start of his Librarianship, he also showed himself to be an innovator, rapidly establishing a new Library Committee which provided a forum for him to discuss with members the management of the Library, and future improvements that could be made to it. The Committee still exists today, although it is now known as the Information Committee and has a much wider remit than just the Library, overseeing the use of information across the House. Clay also oversaw the completion of the new law book card catalogue, and the Library's Parliamentary works were re-catalogued on cards at the same time. He was also the first Librarian to arrange the books into subject order on the shelves—until then they had been shelved in a haphazard, disorderly fashion.

Despite the bomb damage sustained by the Palace of Westminster during the Second World War, the Library's stock escaped unscathed. Clay ordered that all the books should be pushed back into the recesses of the shelves, and had the shelves covered in curtains to protect the books from the impact of explosions, particularly from flying glass. On one occasion a bomb hit the Law Lords Corridor and blew out all the Library's windows, but thanks to Clay's precautions no books were damaged. Some of the rarer material, such as manuscripts, was sent to the Bodleian Library in Oxford for the duration of the War.

Once the War was over, Clay continued to innovate by helping to set up an internal bindery unit in the House of Lords, which led to a reduction in the amount of material that needed to be sent out to external binders. The bindery, which was established in 1946 under the management of the Stationery Office (HMSO), still exists today and is still used by the Library, although it is now run by staff of the British Library. The same year saw the establishment by the Clerk of the Parliaments of the House of Lords Record Office (now known as the Parliamentary Archives), set up to look after the archives of both Houses of Parliament in the Victoria Tower. In the years since, a sizeable number of historic and special items that used to be kept in the Library have been transferred to the Archives, where the storage conditions are more suitable for them; the death warrant of Charles I is the most notable example. The Library's own archives are now also stored in the Victoria Tower.

During the final years of Clay's tenure, the Library acquired a valuable gift in the shape of the Viscountess D'Abernon's bequest of 140 historic volumes from her own private library, including works dating back to the early 16th century. The D'Abernon gift arrived in 1954; two years later, Clay retired and was replaced by Christopher Dobson.

=== 1956–1977 ===
Dobson, Librarian from 1956, would oversee a major redecoration of the Library between 1969 and 1972. During that time, the main Library suite had its woodwork cleaned and restored, and the panels above the shelves, which featured the arms of the Lord Chief Justices of England, were repainted. In 1975, the Library also expanded its space by taking over the Salisbury Room, just south of the main suite, which had previously been used as a committee room. Dobson also had to deal with a steady increase in demand among members for the services of the Library, particularly research services. Traditionally, the Library's chief focus had been on supporting the judicial work of the House, rather than the legislative work, but things began to change in 1958, when life peers sat in the Lords for the first time. There was more of a demand for the Library's services from the life peers, and as their numbers grew over the next twenty years so did the work of the Library in trying to support them. The judicial focus of the Library was also diluted by the move of the Law Lords from offices very near to the Library to the far side of the Palace at the start of the 1970s, which led to the establishment of a small, separate collection for the exclusive use of the Law Lords.

=== After 1977 ===
By 1976, it was clear that the Library's services were in need of modernisation, and the Leader of the House therefore appointed a Working Group of members to consider how this could be achieved. Lord Eccles, a former minister, was appointed to chair the committee, which included peers from all sides of the House. The report of the Working Group appeared in March 1977, and effectively created the Library service that exists today. The report recommended the creation of a proper research service for members, the acquisition of more books relating to current affairs and the business before the House, the establishment of a separate room, away from the main suite, for the receipt of new material, the establishment of a new centre for enquiries in the Queen's Room, the introduction of IT facilities and, for the first time, the recruitment of librarians with professional qualifications.

Christopher Dobson retired a few months after the report was published, and it therefore fell to his successor, Roger Morgan, to implement the Working Group's recommendations. By the time Morgan himself retired in 1991, great strides forward had been made. Library research clerks were appointed for the first time to provide in-depth research for members, and professional librarians began to be recruited to look after reader and technical services. The old card catalogue was replaced with a microfiche one, produced by sending data to the British Library to turn into a microfiche format, and by 1991 the Library's first online catalogue had been established, together with the automation of book acquisitions and the receipt of periodicals. The 1980s also saw the Library begin to subscribe to online databases such as Lexis/Nexis, which would later move on to the Internet, and the arrival of POLIS, an electronic index of the official deposited papers received by the libraries of both Houses, together with other official publications. This in turn would be superseded by PIMS in 2005.

== The Library today ==
David Lewis Jones took over as Librarian in 1991, and during his time in charge the number of staff in the Library continued to grow, with the recruitment of more research clerks, librarians and secretarial staff. In 1976, the Library had just ten members of staff, whereas by 2009 there were well over thirty. The Lords itself underwent a historic change in these years, with the removal of the majority of the hereditary peers from membership of the House in 1999. In the years since, the Library has served a membership that now largely consists of working life peers, and its services have been very well-used. When David Jones retired in 2006, the Library underwent its own change by becoming part of a wider Department of Information Services, headed by the then new Librarian, Elizabeth Hallam-Smith, and also consisting of the Parliamentary Archives and the House of Lords Information Office.

The Library retains its own identity, however, and in recent years it has embraced the possibilities of the digital age, acquiring its own intranet site and subscribing to a large number of e-journals and other web resources, while continuing in its traditional role of providing a repository for Parliamentary papers. The Library's law collection also remains very large, though the long-standing connection with the Law Lords was finally severed in the autumn of 2009 when the Law Lords moved to the new Supreme Court, taking their own library with them. The Lords Library, however, still maintains its main law collection in the Brougham Room as a resource for all members. The collection today is also very strong on works of history, politics and biography, and many of the Library's more historic works are still on display in the Derby Room (named after the 15th Earl of Derby, twice Foreign Secretary in the nineteenth century) and elsewhere.

The Library now stretches well beyond the core riverside suite of rooms; its expansion was driven in no small part by the increase in the size of the collections, which by 1991 had grown to around 80,000 bound volumes, plus other documents like reports and pamphlets. Staff work in several offices scattered over the Lords end of the Palace of Westminster, and parts of the collection are stored in the basements, the Committee Corridor and in outside storage facilities at the Queen Elizabeth II Conference Centre and Westminster Archives. In 2001, a branch library was opened across the road in Millbank House, to serve the numerous members and their staff who now had offices over there due to overcrowding in the Palace. This branch library closed in the summer of 2009, and will be replaced in 2011 by a new e-library at 1 Millbank which will boast considerably more space, including more office room for Library staff. Work is also ongoing to bolster the Library's online presence with the creation of a new virtual library, a project that first began to bear some fruit when a virtual tour of the main Library suite was launched in 2008.

== Librarians of the House of Lords ==
- 1826 – John Frederic Leary
- 1861 – James Heard Pulman
- 1897 – Sandford Arthur Strong
- 1904 – Sir Edmund Gosse
- 1914 – Arthur Hugh Montagu Butler
- 1922 – Sir Charles Travis Clay
- 1956 – Christopher Dobson
- 1977 – Roger Morgan
- 1991 – David L. Jones
- 2006 – Elizabeth Hallam-Smith
- 2015 – Patrick M. Vollmer

== See also ==
- Parliamentary Archives
- House of Commons Library
- Library of Congress, Congressional Research Service (USA)
- Library of Parliament (Canada)

== Sources ==
- The Library of the House of Lords: A Short History by Christopher Dobson (HMSO, 1972)
- House of Lords Library by David L. Jones (in Palace of Westminster Staff News, Volume 7, No. 1, 7 March 2002)
- The Library of the House of Lords: Report of the Working Group (HMSO, 1977)
