= Montagu C. Butler =

British Esperantist (1884–1970)

- Born: Montagu Christie Butler; 25 January 1884
- Died: 5 May 1970 (aged 86)
- Occupation: Esperantist

Montagu Christie Butler (25 January 1884 – 5 May 1970) was a British academic, librarian, lexicographer, musician, and Esperantist. A winner of several prizes at the Royal Academy of Music in London, he was a harpist and a versatile music teacher skilled in playing various musical instruments, as well as a teacher of voice and of musical composition.

As a Quaker and absolute pacifist, Butler was classed as a conscientious objector during World War 1. He served time in prison, where he met the composer and fellow prisoner Frank Merrick, helping him learn Esperanto.

From 1922, Butler was a member of the Lingva Komitato, the group tasked with preserving the fundamental principles of the Esperanto language and guiding its evolution. From 1916 to 1934, he served as secretary of the Esperanto Association of Britain, and was its honorary president from 1961 until 1970. Butler was later elected a member of the international Academy of Esperanto, where he served from 1948 until 1970.

== Writing and translation ==
Butler served as editor of La Brita Esperantisto ("The British Esperantist") in 1931 and 1932; during his editorship the journal became known as one of the most famous Esperanto periodicals of the era. After this period he became one of 57 principal collaborators on the 1933 Esperanto Encyclopædia.

Amongst other works, he translated Caroline Emelia Stephen's Quaker Strongholds. Butler is the editor of two respected Esperanto-language anthologies, Kantaro Esperanta (a songbook with 358 songs) and Himnaro Esperanta (a hymnal with 212 hymns) and even adapted Pitman Shorthand to Esperanto, a task which he regarded as his "most important contribution to the movement.". He also compiled an English translation of the Zamenhof Proverbaro, a collection of L. L. Zamenhof's translated and original proverbs, published as Proverbs in Esperanto and English (1960).

His book Step by Step in Esperanto has for decades remained the most frequently used textbook for English speakers learning Esperanto; a ninth reprint edition, published by Esperanto-USA, appeared in 1991. Similarly successful was his book Esperanto for Beginners (last edition 1996). His First Lessons to young Children (1930) is based on his experiences teaching Esperanto to his own children, who were among the first native speakers of Esperanto. As early as 1921, Butler had published some observations on English and Esperanto language acquisition among three- to four-year-old bilingually educated English children.

== Library science ==
For many years he was librarian of the BEA Library in London, one of the world's most well-stocked Esperanto libraries, which the magazine Esperanto (1970, p. 118) declared to be "kreaĵo de li" ("his creation.") To organize this library he modified the Universal Decimal Classification to the special needs of Esperanto libraries. Several other Esperanto libraries later adopted the system which he had elaborated.

The collection of Esperanto and Esperanto-related books he assembled during his lifetime now forms the heart of the Butler Library, which the BEA established at Wedgwood Memorial College in Staffordshire, England, and named in his honour.

== Lexicography ==
Butler drew on his diverse musical background to compile Muzika Terminaro, (1960, reprinted 1992), an Esperanto-language music terminology dictionary. His over 60 years of linguistic experience in the Esperanto movement culminated in Butler's 1967 Vortaro Esperanto-angla (Esperanto-English Dictionary), published three years before his death at 84. Reviewing the work, the eminent phonetician John C. Wells called it simply "the best Esperanto dictionary in English," and — for lack of a more modern, comprehensive bilingual dictionary — it is still so 45 years later. Butler's reverse English-Esperanto dictionary, with approximately 32,000 headwords, remains as an unpublished 2,000-page manuscript archived in the Butler library.

== Translations ==
- Dickens, Charles: La Vivo de nia Sinjoro Jesuo: Verkita de Charles Dickens Speciale Por Siaj Infanoj ("The life of our Lord Jesus, Written by Charles Dickens especially for his children" (1934)
- Haggard, Henry Rider: Luno de Izrael: rakonto pri la eliro (1928) (Moon of Israel)
- Himnaro : konsistanta el cent himnoj taŭgaj por konataj melodioj (1910)
- Himnaro Esperanta (five editions, 1910–1966)
- Hyde, H. E.: Internacia parlamento: ĉu Britujo montros la vojon? (1918)
- Kantaro Esperanta (1926)
- Konsiloj kaj demandoj (1984)
- Leakey, James: Leakey's introduction to Esperanto : la lingvo internacia (1925)
- Stephen, Caroline: Fundamentoj de la kvakerismo (1916)
- Stephen, Caroline: William Penn (1930)
- Torpey, H. J.: Londonaj interesaĵoj: gvidlibro por la Esperantista vizitanto (1907)
- Zamenhof, Ludwik Lazar: Proverbs in Esperanto and English: from Zamenhof's "Proverbaro"
