= Nevile Butler =

British diplomat

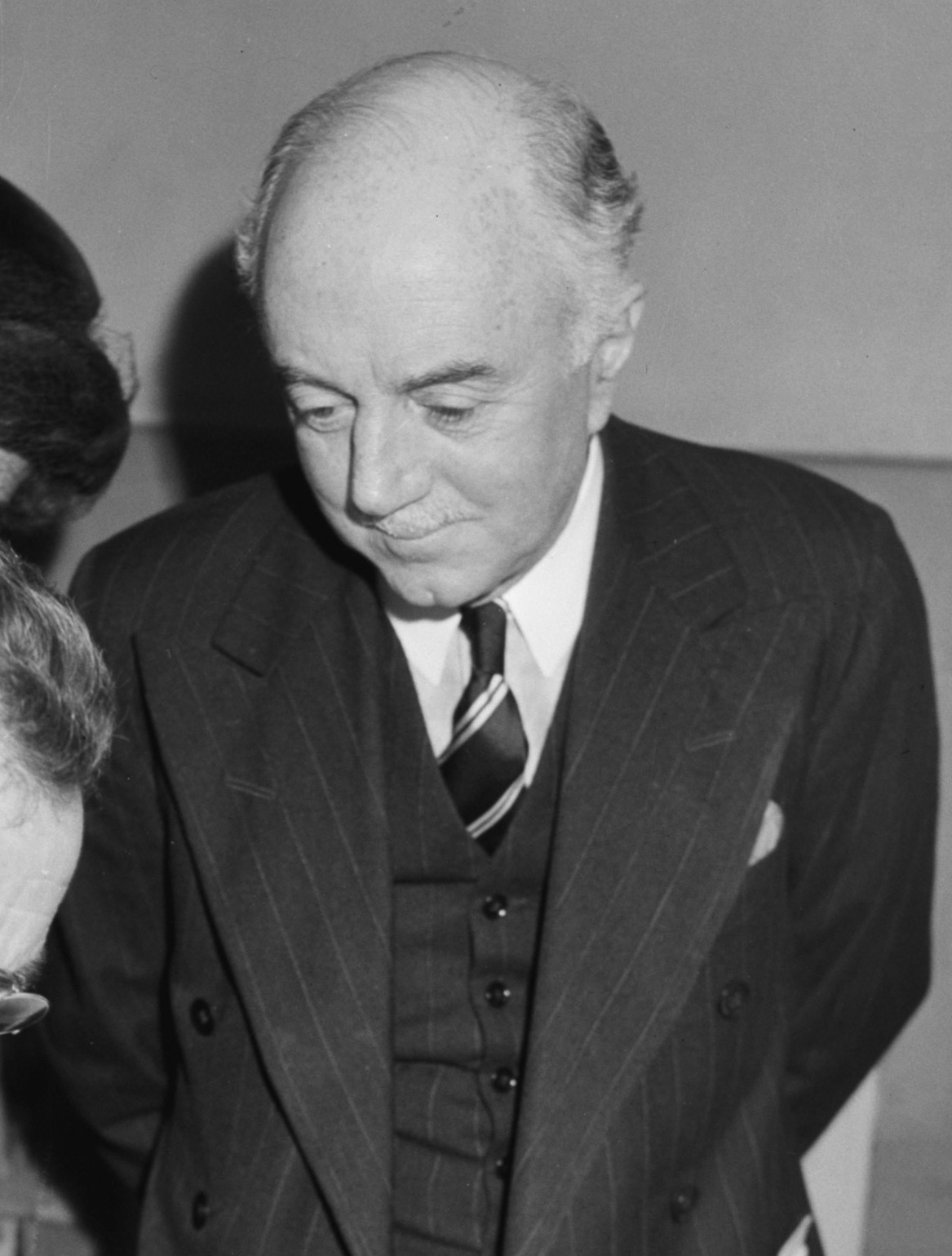
Nevile Butler in the Netherlands in 1953

Sir Nevile Montagu Butler KCMG CVO (20 December 1893 – 11 November 1973) was a British diplomat.

Butler was born in 1893 to Henry Montagu Butler and Agnata Frances Ramsay. He was educated at Harrow School and Trinity College, Cambridge.

After serving as Minister at the British Embassy at Washington in 1940–1941 he headed the North American Department of the Foreign and Commonwealth Office (1941–1944), and between 1944 and 1947 was assistant under-secretary there. He was then appointed as the British ambassador to Brazil (1947–51) and to the Netherlands (1952–54).

For his services he was appointed a Commander of the Royal Victorian Order (CVO) in the 1933 Birthday Honours, a Companion of the Order of St Michael and St George (CMG) in the 1942 New Year Honours and was promoted to Knight Commander in the Order (KCMG) in the 1947 Birthday Honours.

In 1923, he married Oonah Rose McNeile, daughter of Col. John McNeile. They had two daughters.

Diplomatic posts
| Preceded by Donald Gainer | British Ambassador to Brazil; 1947-1952 | Succeeded by Geoffrey Harington Thompson |
| Preceded by Philip Nichols | British Ambassador to the Netherlands; 1952-1954 | Succeeded by Paul Mason |
