= House of Commons Library =

United Kingdom parliamentary library

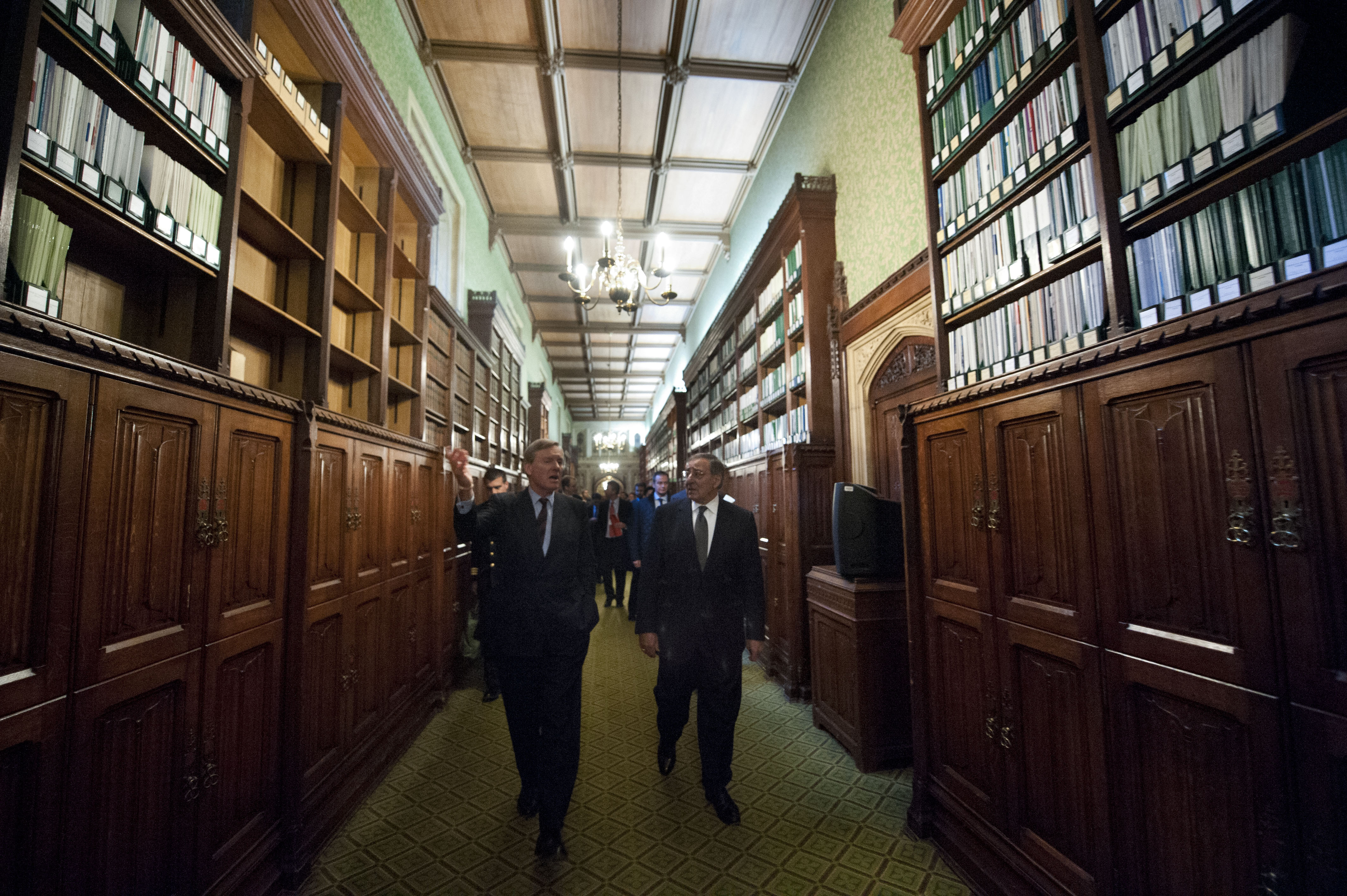
- US Secretary of Defense Leon E. Panetta (right) being given a tour of the House of Commons Library in 2013
- 51.4999°N 0.1241°W
- Location: London, England
- Established: 1818

Collection
- Items collected: Books, journals, official papers
- Size: 350,000 items

Access and use
- Access requirements: Access restricted to Members of Parliament and their staff

Other information
- Website: commonslibrary.parliament.uk

The House of Commons Library is the library and information resource of the lower house of the British Parliament. It was established in 1818, although its original 1828 construction was destroyed during the burning of Parliament in 1834.

The library has adopted the phrase "Contributing to a well-informed democracy" as a summary of its mission statement.

== History ==
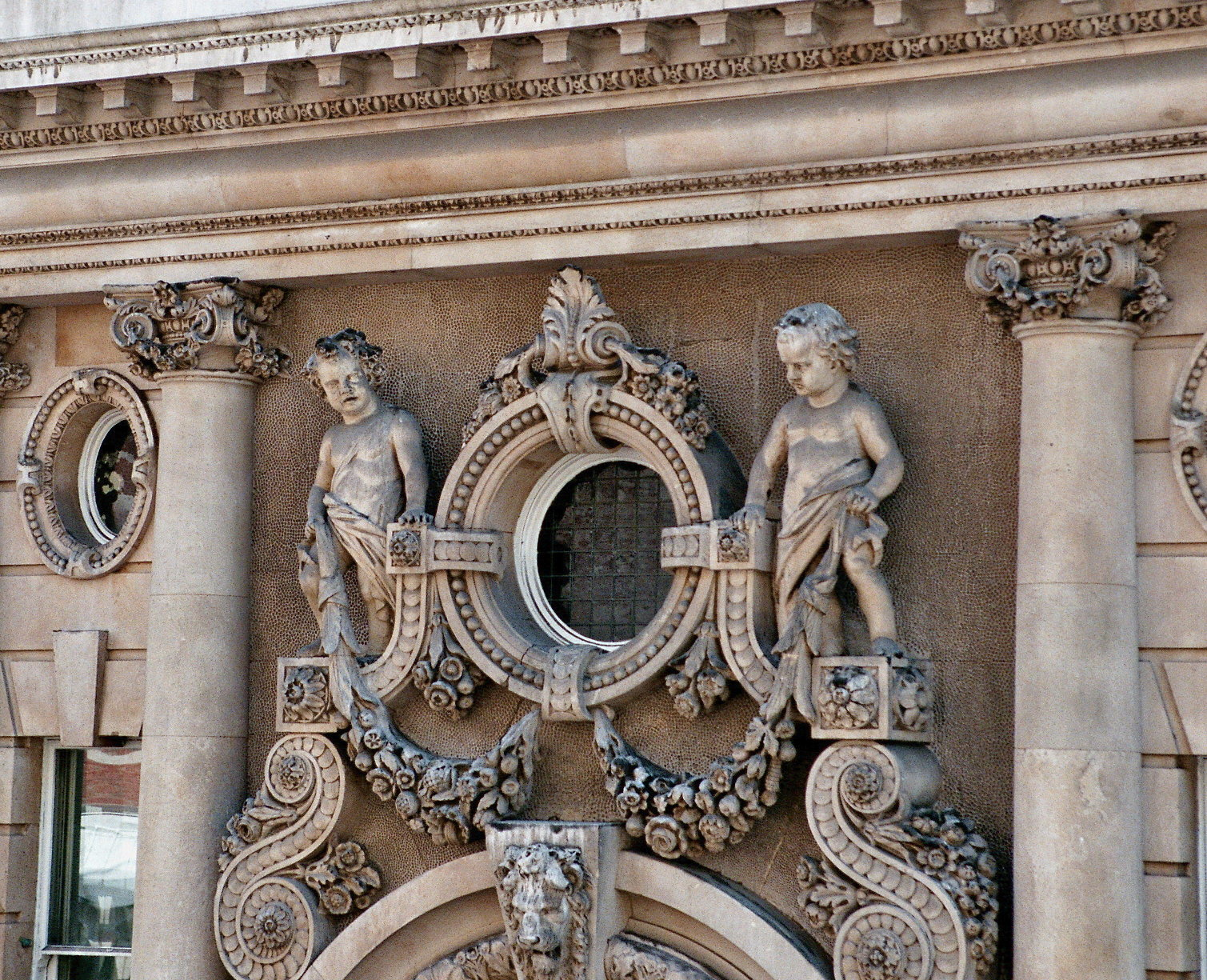
Detail of the facade of the library at No 1 Derby Gate

The Library was established in 1818 and a purpose-designed library was built for it by Sir John Soane and completed in 1828. This building, along with much of the medieval Palace of Westminster, to which it was added, was destroyed by fire in 1834.

In the rebuilding of the Palace of Westminster by Sir Charles Barry and Augustus Welby Northmore Pugin, the Library was given four large rooms on the river front of the principal floor of the new palace, each 40 feet by 25 feet and some 20 ft high. This suite was fully opened by 1852, and two additional rooms added in the mid/late 1850s. One of these was to compensate for the loss of Room D, which was taken over by Speaker Denison and his successors as their private library—it was not restored until the 1960s.

The Library was stocked with some 30,000 books majoring in history, topography, literature, biography and politics, as well as the official papers of the House. Almost alone among contemporary parliamentary libraries, from about 1860 onwards, the staff were given free rein to determine the scope of the collection.

In 1945–46, the House of Commons reorganised its library on modern lines. A Research Division was created, to provide briefings to Members, and to answer their individual detailed enquiries on a confidential and non-partisan basis. A modern reference library was created in the former Map Room, which had been previously equipped with pull-down maps of all parts of the world.

The Public Information Office (now House of Commons Information Office), was set up in 1978, headed by Chris Pond under the oversight of David Menhennet. Menhennet also began electronic publication in the same year, when the Library contributed to the Prestel viewdata system. Computerisation of the Library's information systems began in 1979 with the creation of POLIS, the Parliamentary On-Line Information System.

The total holdings are about 350,000 print items, plus journals and official papers, together with extensive on-line and electronic sources. The Library is not a mandatory or copyright deposit library, unlike the British Library and the Library of Congress. Some of the older book stock was placed on permanent loan in 2004 with the British Museum, to populate the King's Library there (the original King's Library bookstock having been transferred to the British Library at St Pancras). It is the official custodian of the House's printed records.

In 2008 the Library was incorporated into the new Department of Information Services following a Review of Management and Services of the House of Commons conducted by Sir Kevin Tebbit. However, research, information and library services continue to be provided to Members of Parliament and their staff under the House of Commons Library banner. The Department of Information Services is also responsible for information services for the public including Parliament's Education Service, the House of Commons Information Office, Visitor Services and the Web & Intranet Service.

== The Library today ==
The Library provides four core services to the House, Members and their staff:

- A confidential enquiry service for Members and their staff covering all subjects of parliamentary interest. Some 19,200 substantive requests ("logged enquiries") were received in 2010/11.
- Briefings for the House and Members generally covering the business of the House and other issues of parliamentary concern. 83 Research Papers (around half on bills before the House) and 187 Debate Packs were produced in 2010/11. 494 new Standard Notes were published in the year and around 1,200 were updated at least once. Research Papers and most Standard Notes are generally available via the Parliament Website.
- Library services including reading rooms, book loans, on-line resources and reference collections. The Library is one of the main common spaces of the Houses of Parliament; Members use it for conversation, discussion and relaxation as well as consulting information sources. Reading room facilities for Members' Staff are provided in the Derby Gate Library.
- Training and guidance in the use of information, particularly online resources and Library services.

In 2011, the Library had 150 staff, and occupied premises outside the Palace of Westminster (principally the old Whitehall Club at no.1 Derby Gate) as well as within it. Many of the staff have specialist qualifications in, for instance, law, statistics, and various aspects of public affairs, or librarianship. Staff of the Library are not, and have never been, employed by the civil service; they serve, and provide completely impartial advice and analysis to, Members of Parliament.

Although Members of the House of Lords may by courtesy use the Library, the House of Lords has a separate Library.

The Library is not open to the general public, though information about the history and work of the Commons can be supplied by the House of Commons Information Office. Arrangements can often be made for members of the public who wish to use resources of the Library not available elsewhere to have access to them in the Parliamentary Archives.

== Librarians of the House of Commons ==
The following have served as Librarian:

- 1818: Benjamin Spiller
- 1831: Thomas Vardon
- 1867: George Howard
- 1887: Ralph Walpole
- 1908: Austin Smyth
- 1937: John Vivian Kitto
- 1946: Hilary Saunders
- 1950: Strathearn Gordon
- 1967: David Holland
- 1976: David Menhennet
- 1991: Dermot Englefield
- 1993: Jennifer Tanfield
- 1999: Priscilla Baines
- 2004: John Pullinger
- 2015: Penny Young
- 2022: Grant Hill-Cawthorne

== See also ==
- Parliamentary Archives
- House of Lords Library
- Library of Congress, Congressional Research Service (US)
- Library of Parliament (Canada)

== Sources ==
- Menhenne, David (2000). The House of Commons Library – a History, 2nd edition
- Pond, Chris (2001).The Early History of the House of Commons Library
