= Women-only passenger car =

Railway or subway cars intended for women only

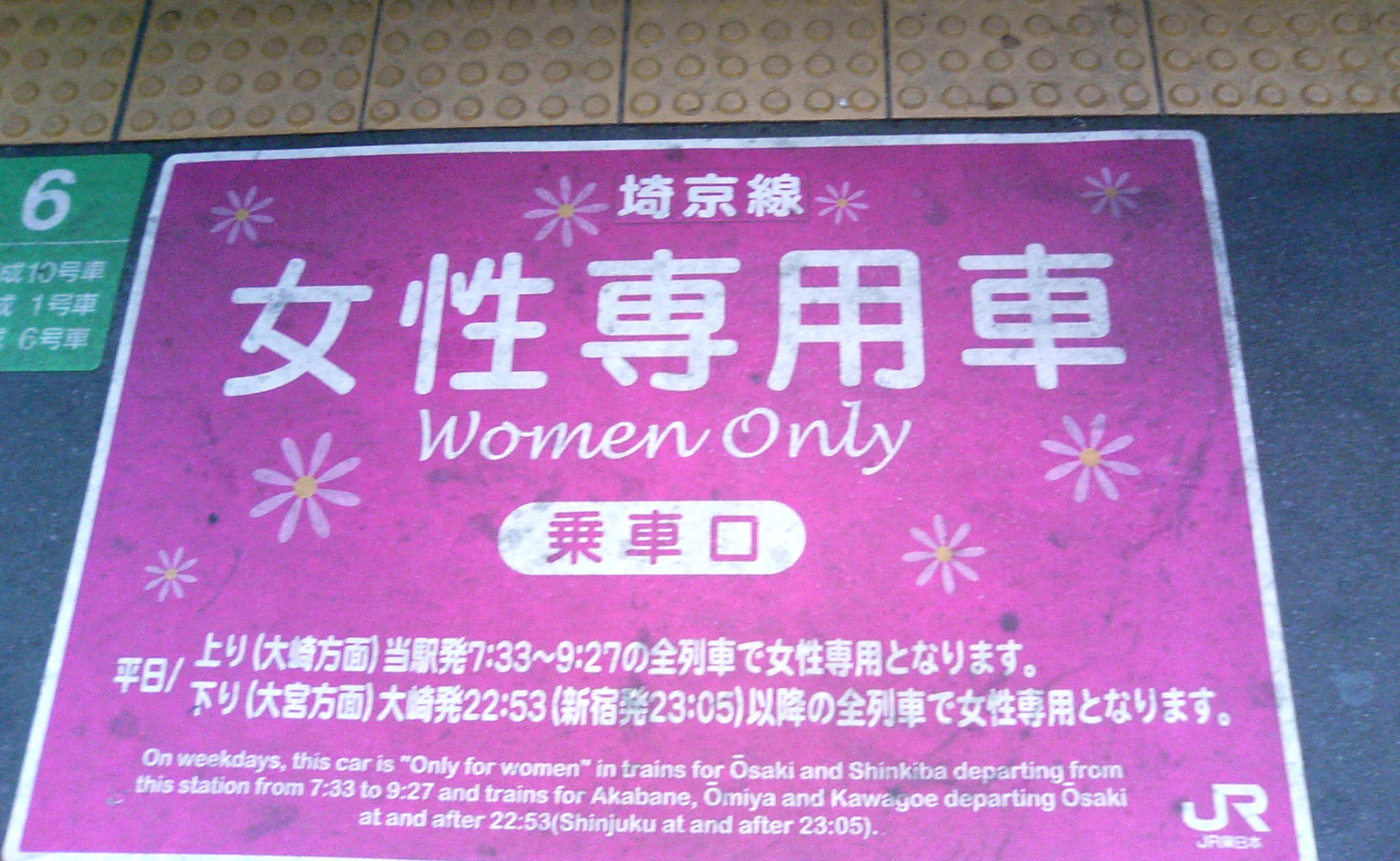
A sign on a Japanese rail platform indicating a boarding point for women-only cars

Women-only passenger cars are railway or subway cars designated for women and girls only, typically with the intention of reducing male-on-female sexual harassment and assault such as groping.

== Africa ==
=== Egypt ===
On all Cairo Metro trains, the middle two cars (4th and 5th) and the foremost car in all Alexandrian trams are reserved for women (the 5th car in the Cairo Metro becomes mixed use after 21:00). These cars are used as an option for women who do not wish to ride with men in the same car; however, women can still ride other cars freely. This policy was introduced for protection of women from sexual harassment by men.

== Americas ==
=== Brazil ===
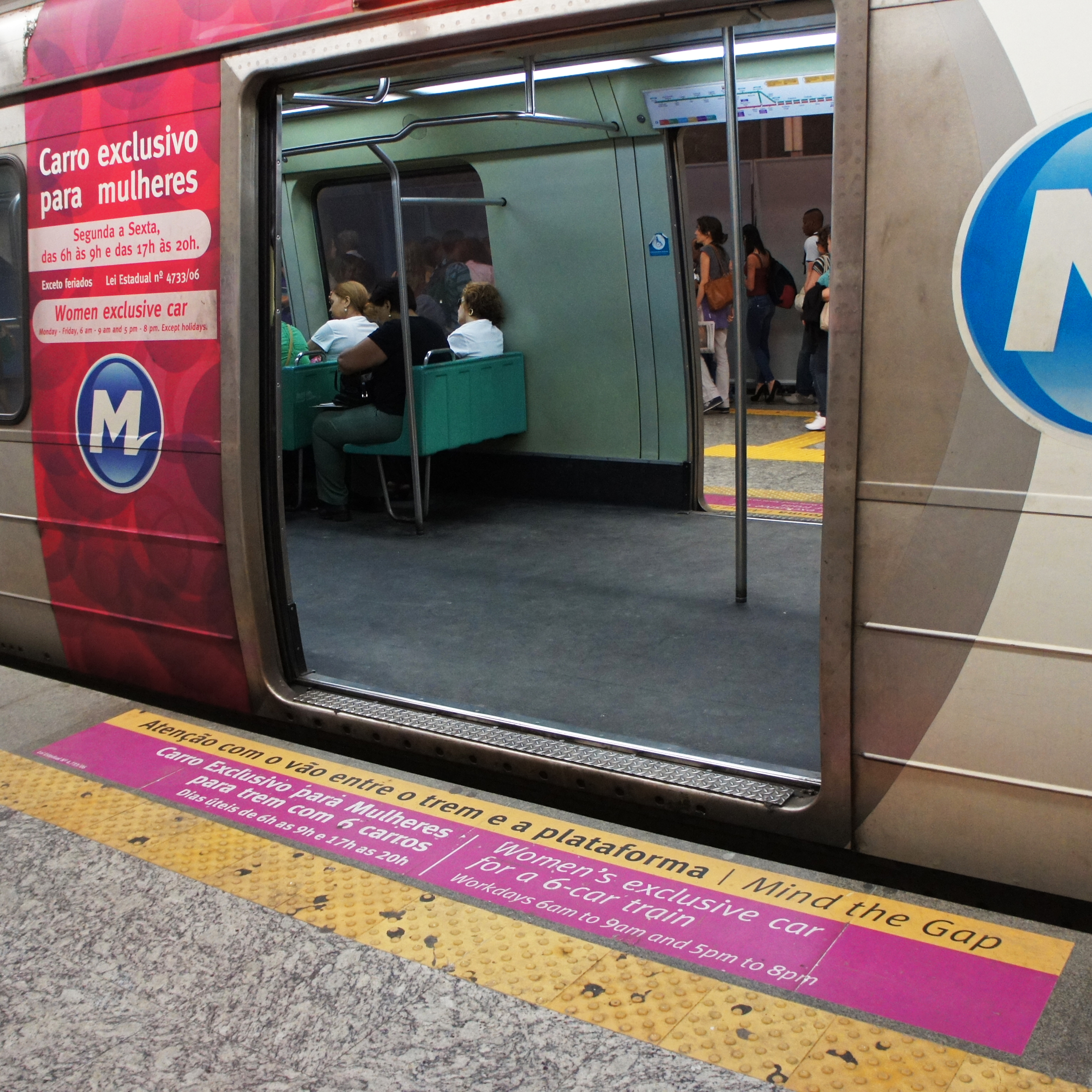
A women-only subway car at Rio de Janeiro Metro

In April 2006, the Rio de Janeiro Metro implemented the mandate established by state law. It was passed in the previous month to have dedicated passenger cars for women to avoid sexual harassment. For trains with six passenger cars, one subway car is marked with pink colors as exclusive for women, and the women-only restriction applies from Monday through Friday during the rush hours, between 06:00 and 09:00 and between 17:00 and 20:00. There is metro police enforcement to prevent men from boarding the dedicated passenger car, and the platform has a sign on the floor indicating the boarding point for women-only cars.

A similar policy was implemented at São Paulo Metro between October 1995 and September 1997, but the Companhia Paulista de Trens Metropolitanos (CPTM) decided not to continue after some complaints by married couples and to avoid any possible contravention of article 5 of the Brazilian Constitution, that guarantees equality among citizens.

=== Mexico ===
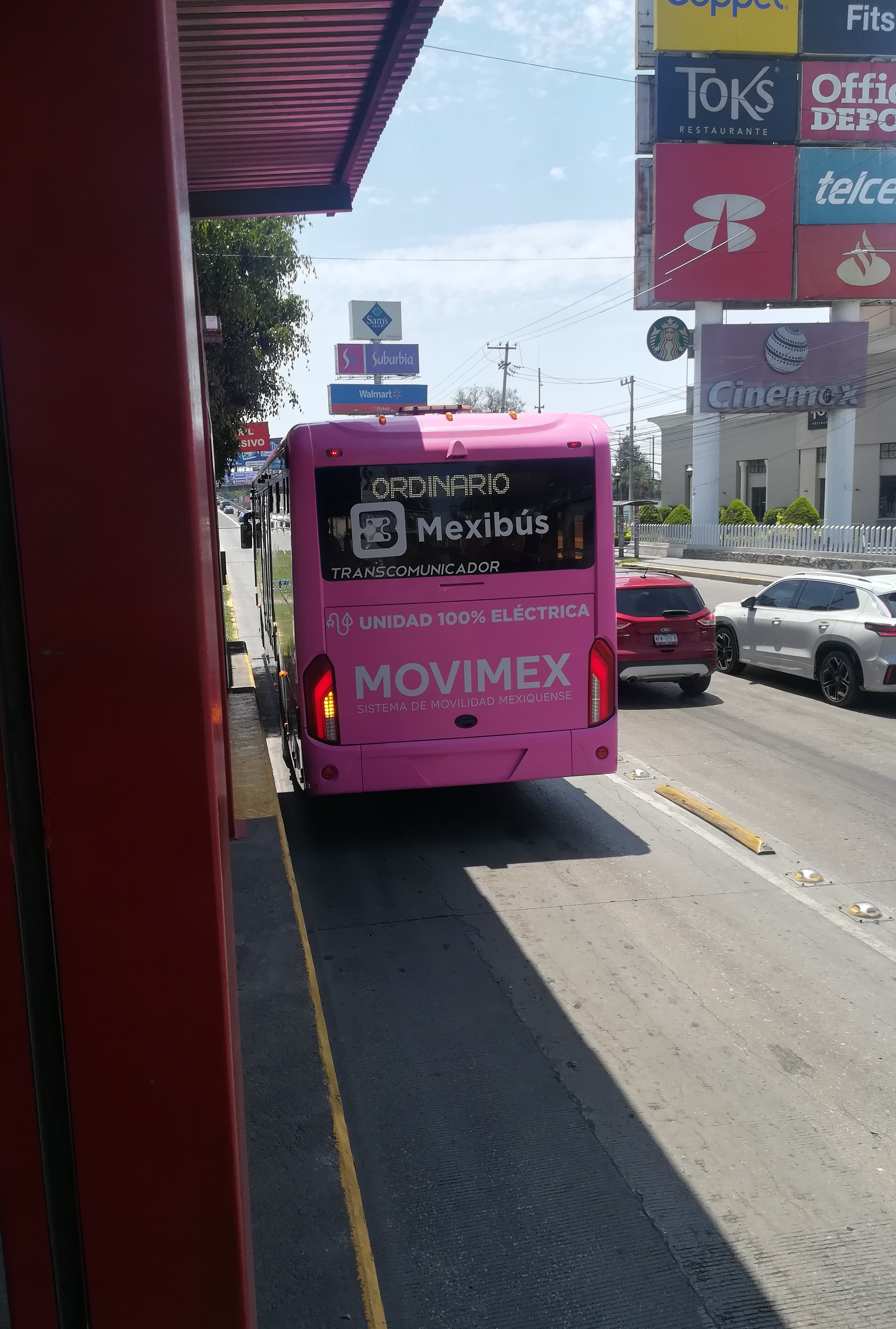
A women-only Mexibús service

Women-only buses were implemented in Mexico City in 2008. The Mexico City Metro has women-only cars. Mexico City also has women-only taxis and buses called the "pink line". Buses and taxis are now gone.

=== United States ===
In 1909, the Women's Municipal League called for women-only cars on New York City's Interborough Rapid Transit Company (IRT). While the IRT rejected the proposal, the Hudson & Manhattan Railroad offered women-only cars between New York and Jersey City from April to July 1909. The service was revived in 1958, but later discontinued.

== Asia ==
=== Japan ===
==== Current practice ====
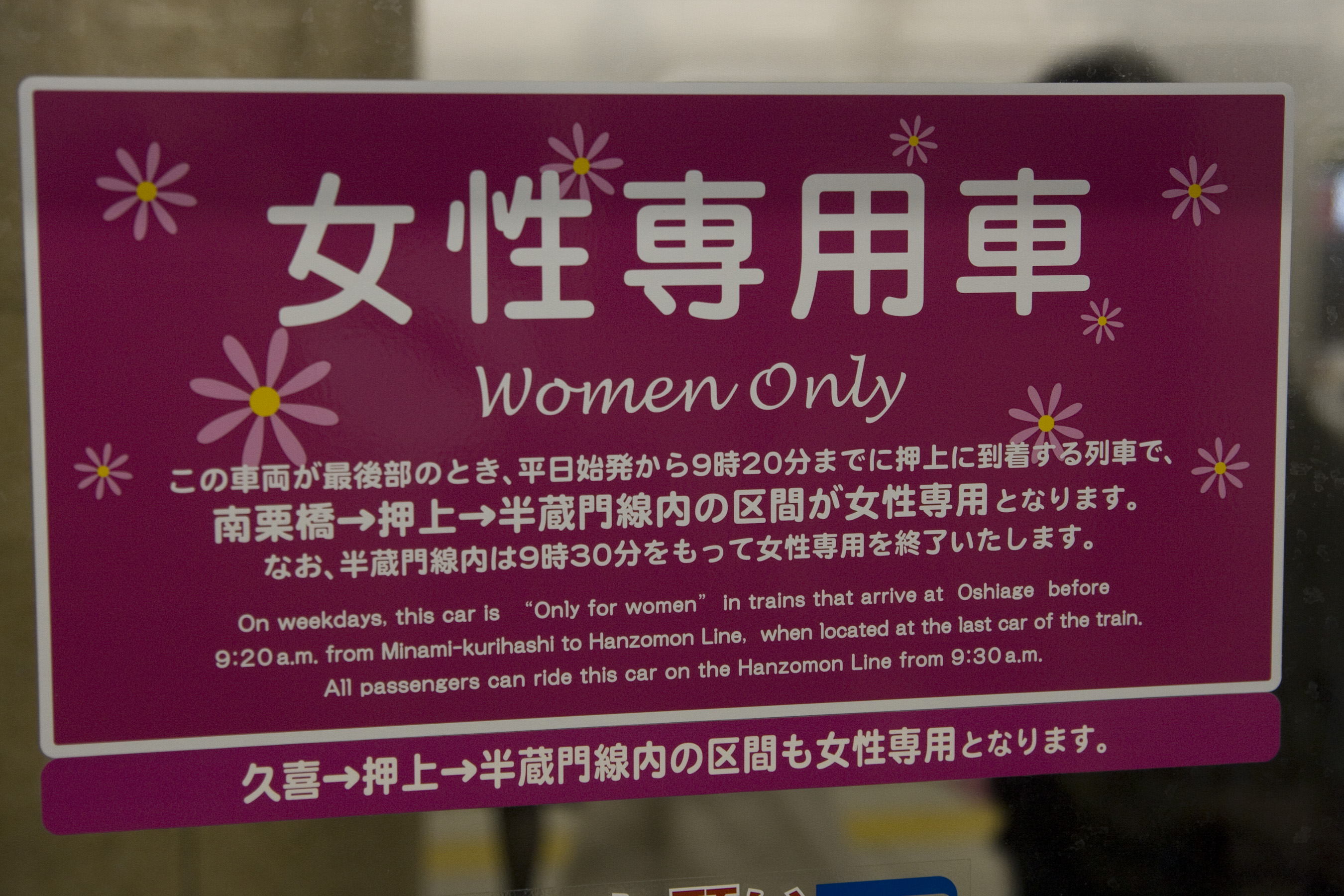
"Women Only" sign inside Tokyo Metro carriage

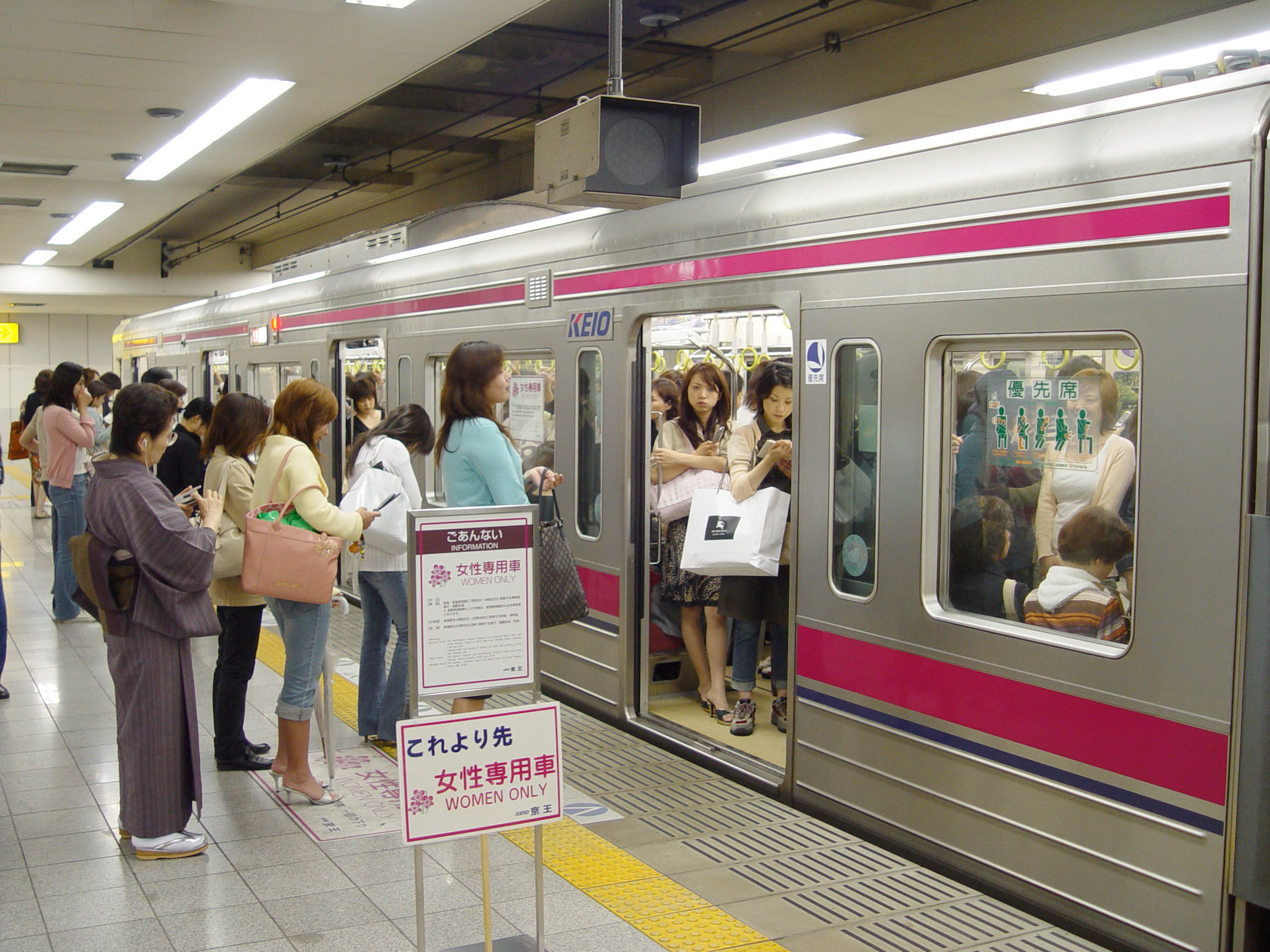
Passengers waiting to board a women-only car on the Keio Line at Shinjuku Station in Tokyo

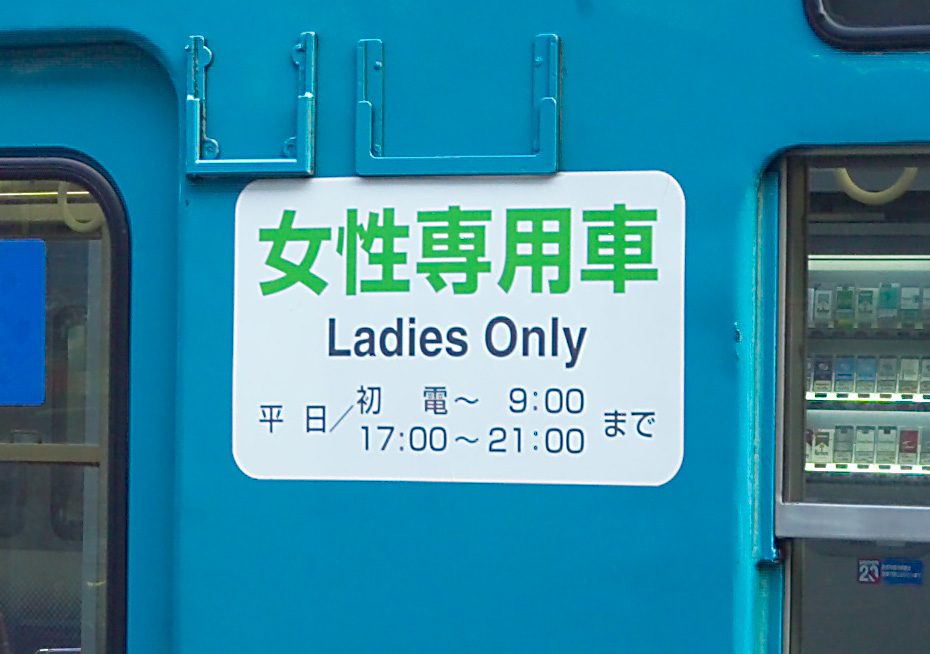
Sign next to door of coach

In Japan, women-only cars were introduced to combat sexual harassment, particularly groping (chikan). Women-only policies vary from company to company: some are in effect during rush hour, others throughout the day, while some limit women-only cars to rapid service trains, as they tend to be more crowded and have relatively longer distances between stops. But in general, the policy is effective only on weekdays, excluding holidays. Platforms and train doors are marked with signs indicating boarding areas for the cars, and the days and times when the cars are women-only. Though intended to be exclusive to women, most train operators in Japan allow male elementary school pupils, disabled persons, and their assistants to board women-only cars.

Groping in crowded trains has been a problem in Japan: according to National Police Agency and Ministry of Justice, the number of reported indecent assault in subway carriages in nationwide Japan between 2005 and 2014 ranges from 283 to 497 cases each year. The police and railway companies responded with poster campaigns to raise awareness and with tougher sentences, but incidence continues to increase. In 2004, the Tokyo police reported a threefold increase in reported cases of groping on public transportation over eight years.

In December 2000, Keio Electric Railway, which operates trains between Tokyo and its suburbs, offered women-only cars late at night on a trial basis, in response to complaints about groping by drunken men during the bōnenkai party season. Keio began running trains with late-night women-only cars on a full-time basis in March 2001. In July 2001, JR East began a similar service on the Saikyo Line, which connects Tokyo with Saitama Prefecture and had become notorious for gropers because of crowding and longer distances between stops. The following year, the service was extended to evening rush hour.

In July 2002, JR West became the third company in Japan to run trains with women-only cars, and the JR West trains in Osaka became the first to offer women-only cars during morning rush hour. The same year, two more Osaka-area railways, Hankyu Railway and Keihan Railway, added women-only cars to their limited express trains, and Hankyu became the first company to run women-only cars all day long. Other Osaka-area companies followed suit, including Osaka Municipal Subway, whose Midosuji Line, which carries passengers at as much as 160% capacity, had a reputation for having the worst groping problem in all of Japan. Tokyo-area companies resisted the change because of logistical difficulties and fear of overcrowding in mixed-gender cars, but in 2005 they introduced women-only cars during rush hour, after awareness campaigns and tougher sentencing proved ineffective.

Women-only cars have received positive reactions from some men and some women. Women cited safety from gropers, as well as not having to tolerate various smells. Men cited not having to worry about false accusations of being a groper. However, passengers complained about further overcrowding in mixed cars, and feared that women who ride mixed cars would be putting themselves at more risk than before. Visually-impaired men have been reported to unknowingly enter a women-only car and to be warned by other passengers, facing serious embarrassment.

Japanese legislation from 1900 provides for a 10-yen fine for male passengers who enter a female-only railway car or waiting room; this law is technically still in effect, but the Japanese government has opined that it would not apply to the "women only" cars that are currently in use, making compliance with the "women only" rule voluntary from a legal perspective.

==== Historical practice ====
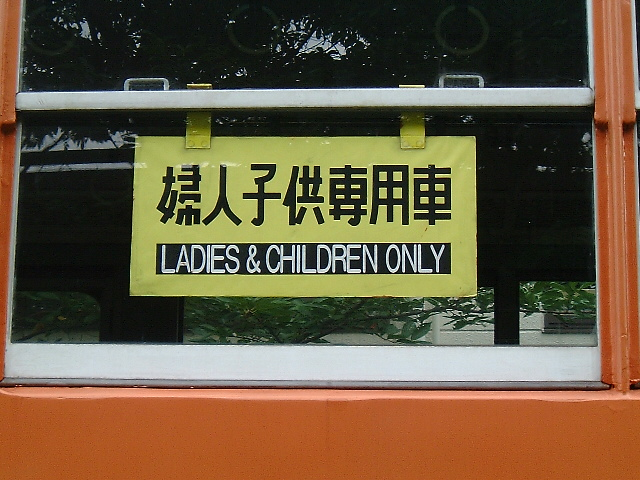
Signage previously used on the Chuo Main Line

The earliest instance of women-only cars in Japan was in 1912 on the present day Chuo Main Line, when they were introduced during rush hours to separate male and female students. Called "Flower Trains", the service ended during World War II. Women-only streetcars were introduced in Kobe in 1920, and Hankyu Railway ran special trains for schoolgirls commuting between Kobe and Nishinomiya in the 1930s.

Cars exclusively for women and children were introduced on the Chuo Main Line and Keihin-Tohoku Line in 1947, after the end of World War II. At the time, overcrowding on these lines during rush hours was so severe that women and children often could not physically board trains. The cars remained in use on morning inbound Chuo Main Line trains until 1973, when priority seating was introduced; they were retired from the Keihin-Tohoku Line at an earlier date.

=== India ===
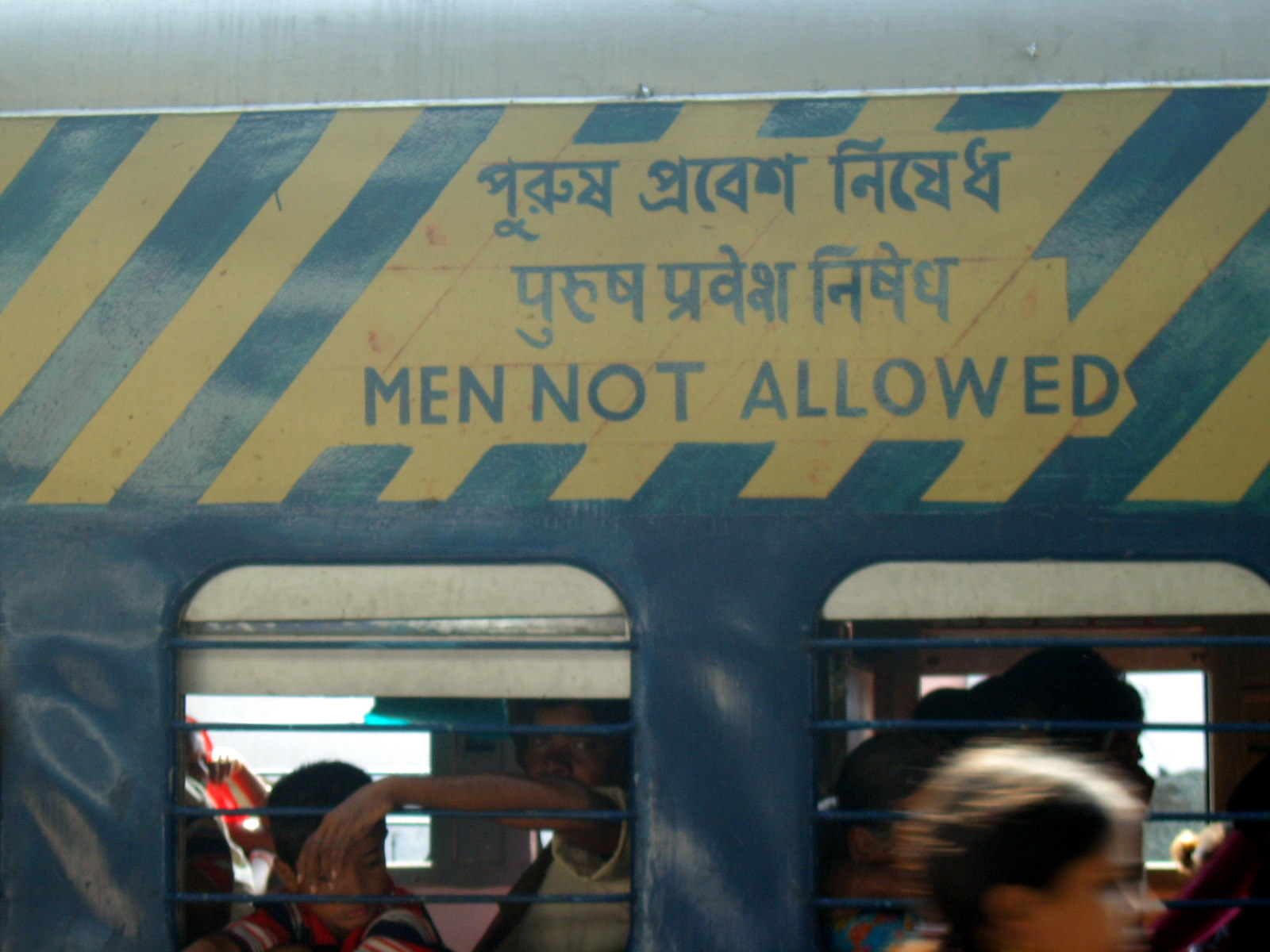
A women-only carriage in India

Across India, all long-distance train services have special compartments reserved for women only. In Mumbai, the commercial metropolis, all suburban commuter trains have compartments specially meant only for women, though children of school-going age are also allowed to travel. While two compartments are designated for women 24 hours a day, one compartment is reserved for women during specified hours. The women-only compartments are provided for first as well as second class travel. Also, "Ladies' Special" trains have been introduced during peak hours where the entire train is reserved for women. There are three-four women-only specials during peak hours. With the number of women needing to travel doubling in the 2000s, there is a very strong demand for these kinds of services. Many rail services offer women-only cars, including, among others, the Mumbai Metro and Delhi Metro. It has even given rise to a women-only taxi and rickshaw services.

=== Indonesia ===
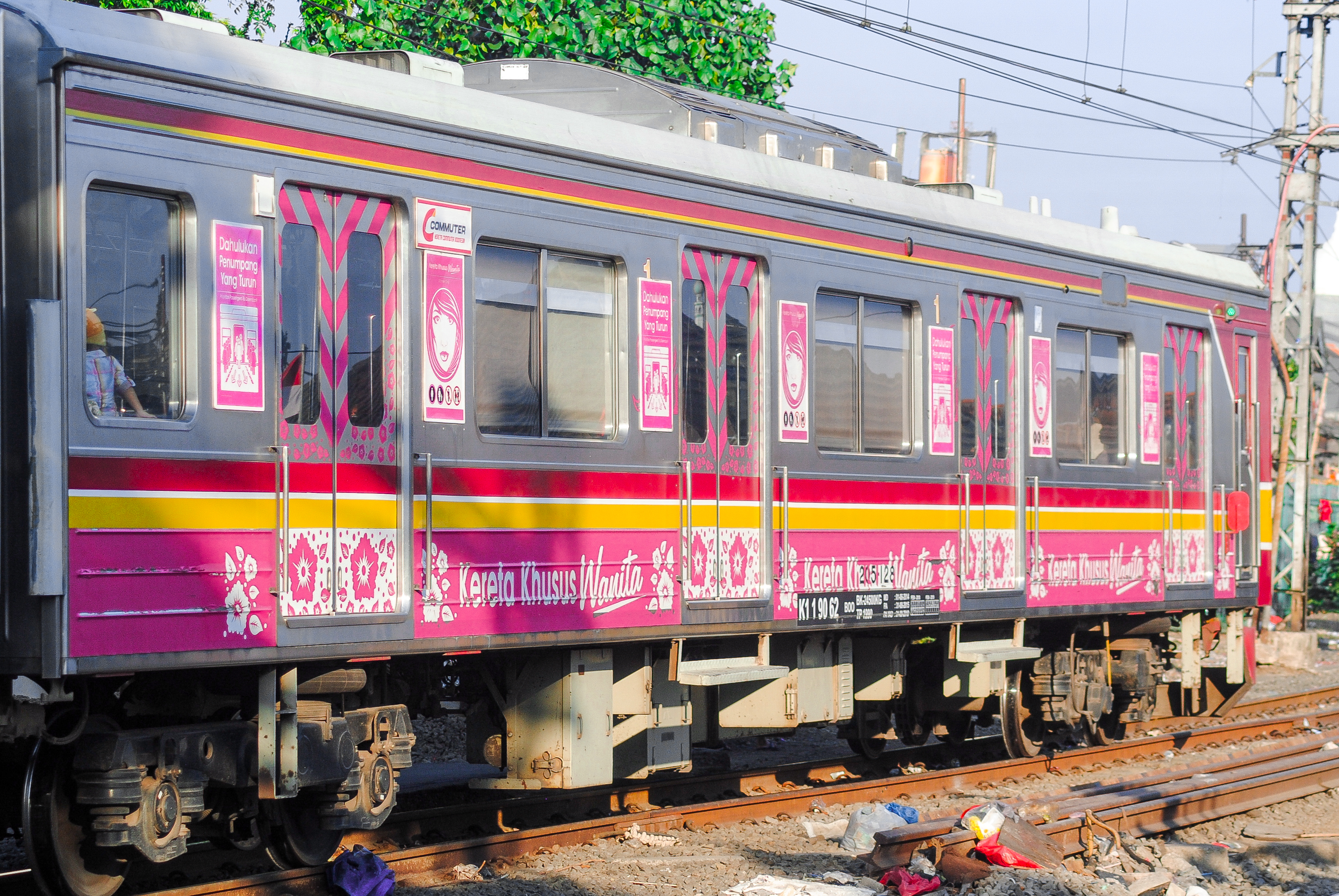
A women-only car at the front of a KRL Commuterline in the Jakarta area, July 2019

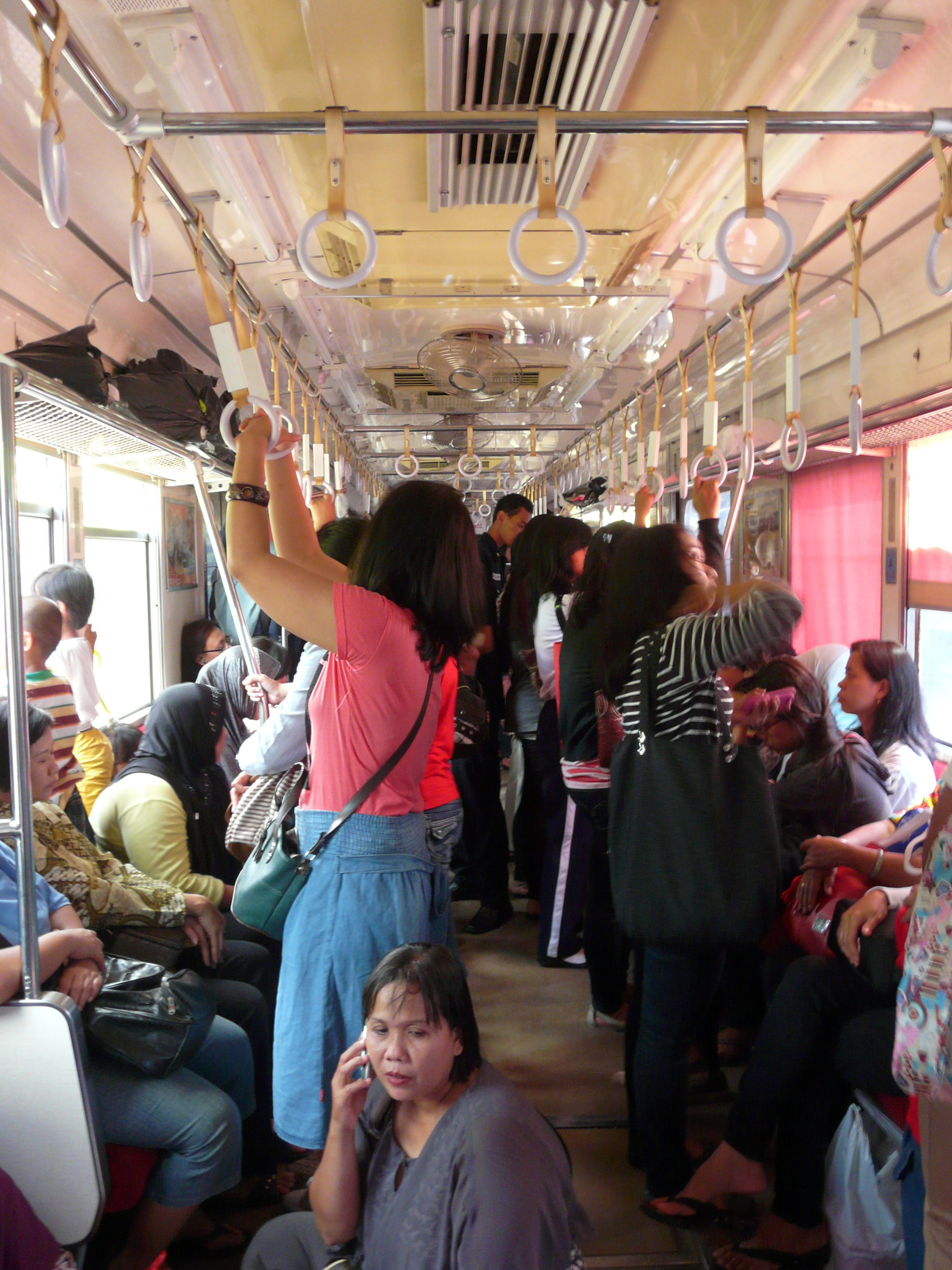
Interior view of a women-only car on a KRL Jabotabek commuter train in the Jakarta area, November 2011

An Indonesian railway company, PT Kereta Api, introduced women-only carriages on some KRL Jabotabek commuter trains in the Jakarta metropolitan area from August 2010 in response to many reports of sexual harassment in public places, including commuter trains and buses.

The women-only carriages on commuter trains are usually denoted by large pink or purple stickers, which read "Kereta Khusus Wanita", and are located at each end of the train. This kind of carriage was previously only able to be found on air-conditioned Electric Multiple Units (EMUs), but a number of recently repaired non-air conditioned EMUs (series KL3 or K3) have also been equipped with the purple women-only carriage stickers. Now, the women-only carriage stickers in Jabodetabek EMUs has been removed from February 2016 until now, and only replaced with the pink women-only carriages signs.

Recently, PT Kereta Api launched a special women-only train (the train itself uses an ex-Tokyo Metro 6000 series EMU, set number 6107F), which intended as further protection for women passengers from sexual harassment. To give difference from standard EMUs (which only provides women-only carriages on each end of the train), the women-only train had all of its cars decorated with large "Kereta Khusus Wanita" stickers colored purple or pink. Since October 1, 2012, PT Kereta Api Indonesia (Persero) Commuter Jabodetabek (now pt kereta commuter indonesia) launched the women-only trains. All of the coach cars of this train are only for women, and men don't enter these trains. This service ended in May 2013 after reports found mixed-use cars were overcrowded during rush hour while women-only cars were underutilized.

On 12 December 2011, Transjakarta, the bus rapid transit operator in Jakarta, introduced women-only areas in its buses. It is located at the front of each bus, from behind the driver to the seats near the door. In July 2022, the Transportation Service of the provincial government of Jakarta planned to introduce women-only areas in angkots (share taxis) by designating left seats for women and right seats for men.

After the 2026 Bekasi Train Crash, which involved the rearmost women-only carriage being most impacted in a collision with a locomotive, the Minister of Women Empowerment and Children Protection, Arifah Choiri Fauzi, made a statement that the women-only carriages should be moved to the center of the train. Prompting a response from KAI's CEO, Bobby Rasyidin, stating that the placement of the women-only carriage has gone through multiple considerations, such as accessibility and the placement of security officers guarding the women-only carriage. She has since rescinded and apologized the statement.

=== Iran ===
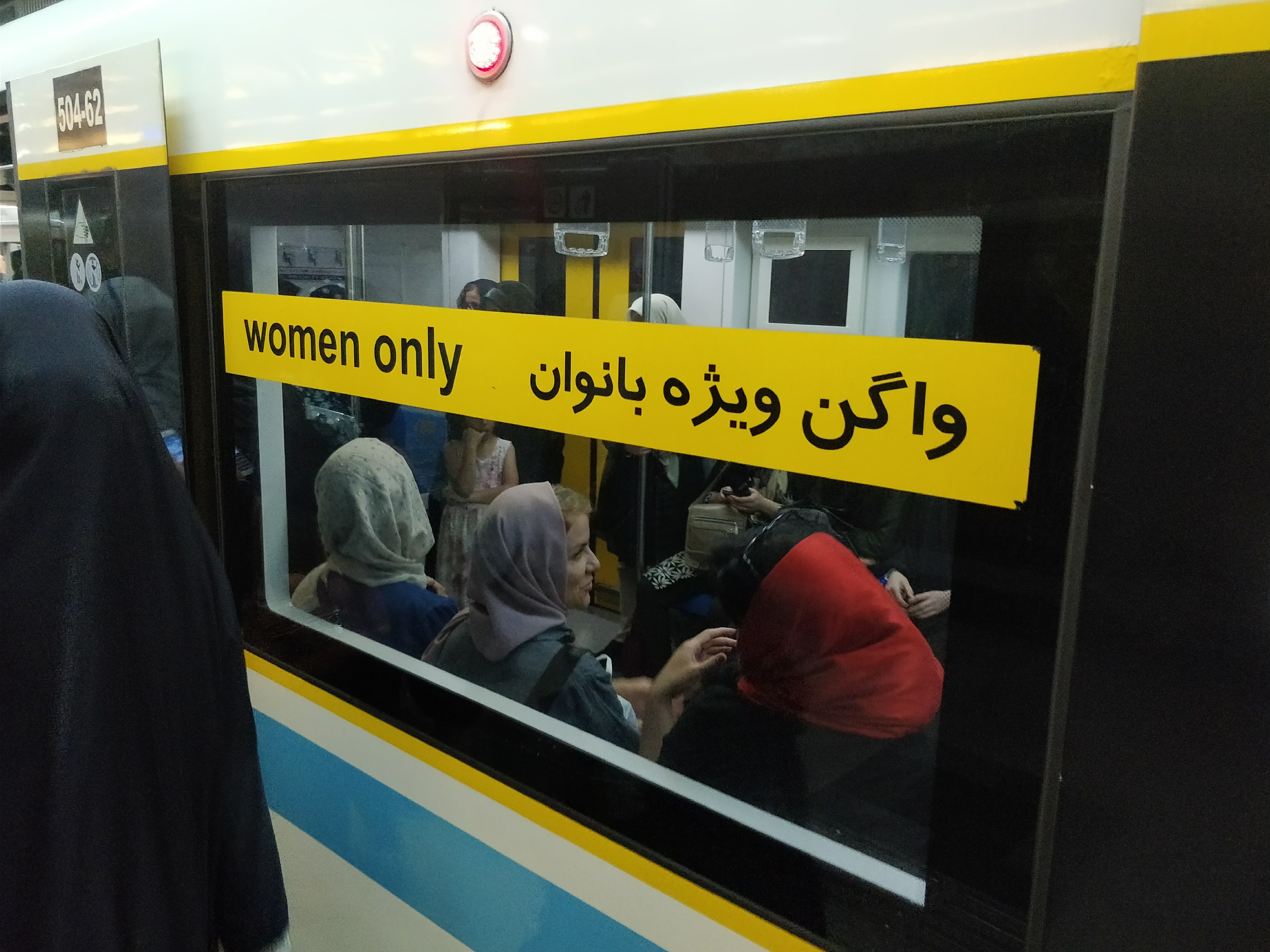
Women-only passenger car in Tehran Metro

There are currently women-only passenger cars, at least in Tehran and Mashhad. Every train has two women-only carriages, on the front and the back.

=== Malaysia ===
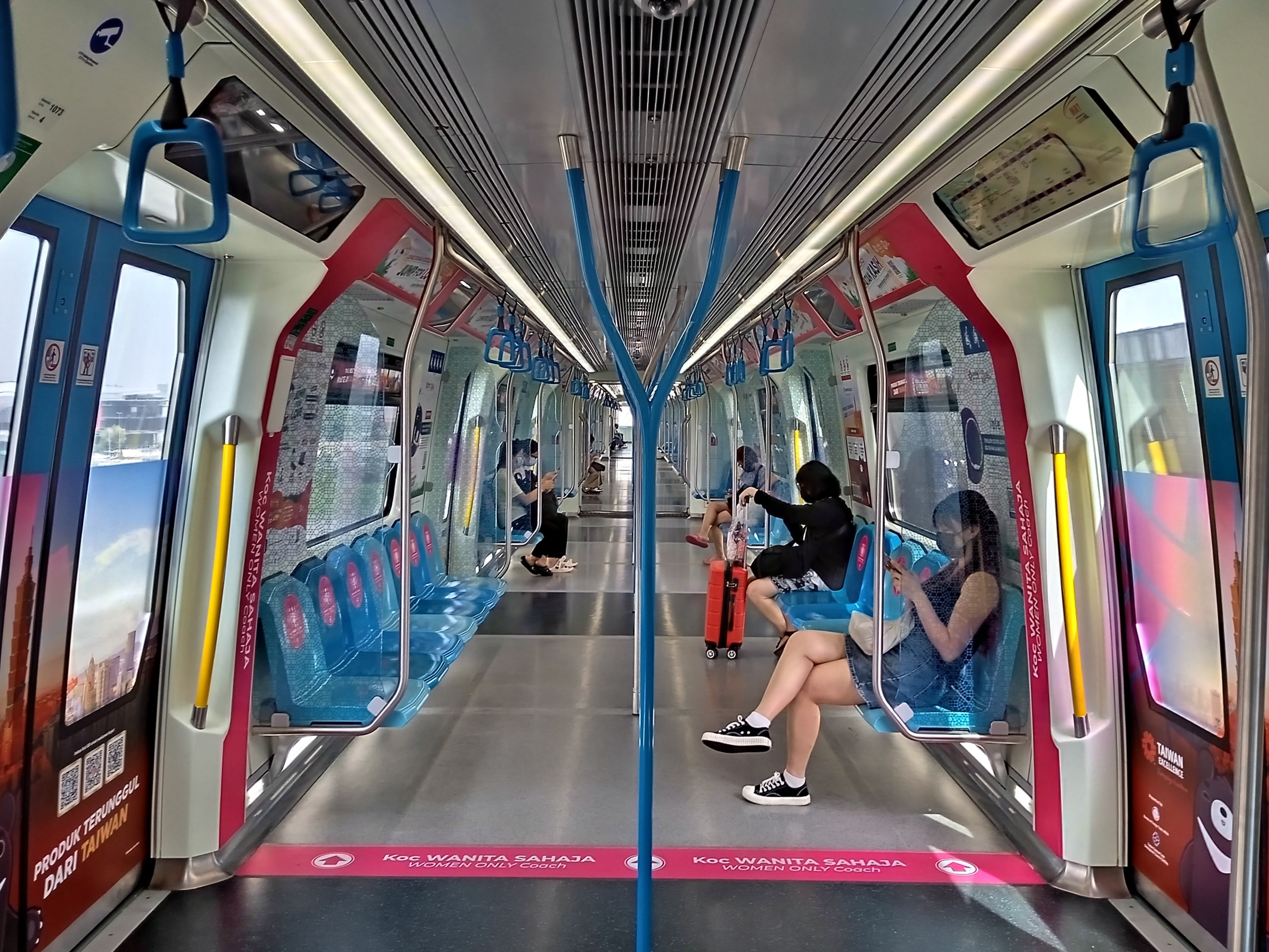
Women-only coach on the Kajang Line

Floor signage for the women-only coach at the Ampang and Sri Petaling lines platform at Masjid Jamek station.

Sexual harassment in Malaysia is common, and since 2010 trains on the Malaysian Railway have included pink-colored women-only cars as a means of cutting down on it. There are also women-only buses in Kuala Lumpur since 2010. In 2011, the government launched a women-only taxi service in the greater Kuala Lumpur area. The taxis have women drivers, and operate on an on-call basis.

The Kajang Line introduced its women-only coach on 18 September 2023, followed by the Putrajaya Line on 8 April 2024 and Ampang and Sri Petaling Lines on 31 December the same year. The coaches are labelled with pink sign and decals on its interior, exterior, and on the floor of the boarding point of the coach at the station, with the coaches being located at the centre of the train.

=== Philippines ===
The Light Rail Transit Authority, which operates LRT Line 1 and the LRT Line 2 on the Manila Light Rail Transit System, had previously designated the first car (consisting of 2-3 articulated cars) of every LRT-1 trainset as exclusive to the elderly, pregnant women, people with disabilities, and adults with infants or children. On November 27, 2002, this was extended to include all women passengers as well.

On April 1, 2006, the Manila Metro Rail Transit System followed suit, designating the first car (consisting of three articulated cars) of every MRT Line 3 trainset as exclusive to women, children, the elderly, and people with disabilities.

=== Taiwan ===
Like Japan, Taiwan had women-only cars in TRA's local service in 2006. But because the cars did not have the desired effect on gender discrimination, they were abolished after 3 months. There are also waiting sections for women-only in specific times (for example, during night hours on Taipei Metro) as well.

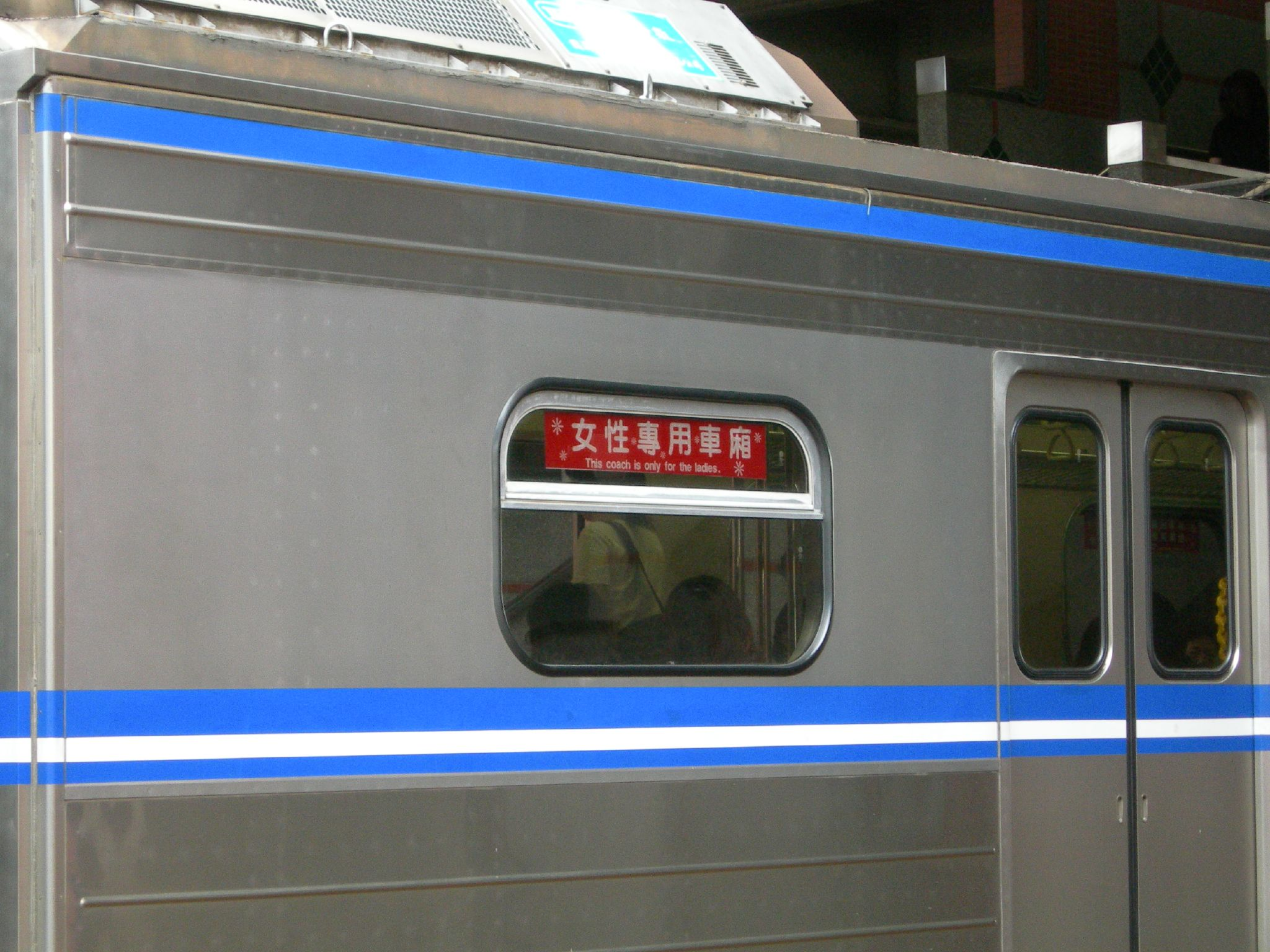
A women-only car on a TRA EMU train in Taiwan, June 2006

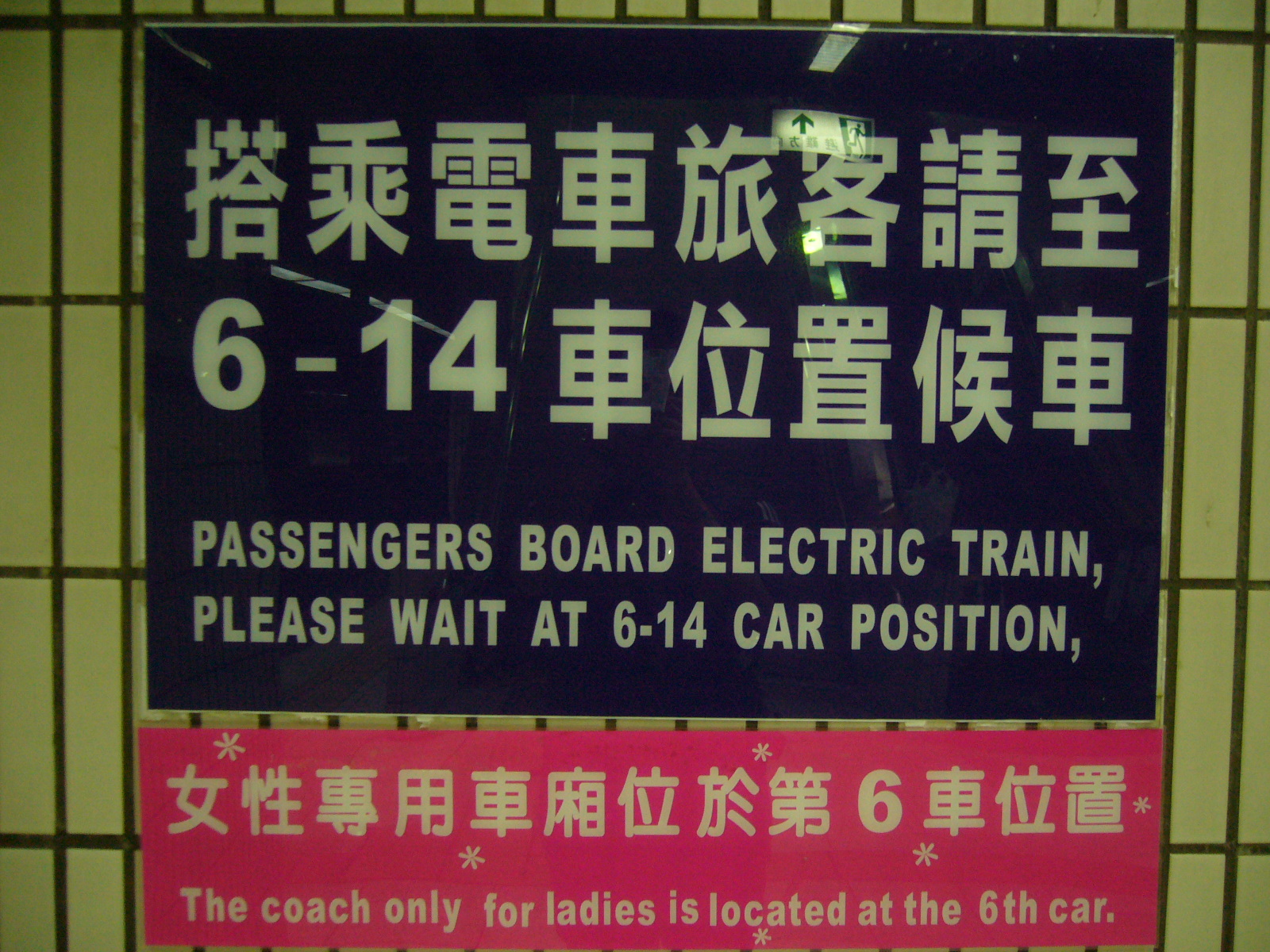
Sign at Taipei Main Station, Taiwan

=== United Arab Emirates ===
Every train on Dubai's metro system has one designated carriage which is only for women and children between 7:00 to 9:00 and 17:00 to 20:00 on weekdays. Men entering the carriage during these times are fined 100 UAE dirhams ($27.25 USD). The women-only carriages used to be half a carriage with a demarcation line marking the divide between the normal space and the women-only space. Around 98 fines are issued every day regarding women-only carriages.

=== Saudi Arabia ===
The Riyadh Metro, upon completion, will feature women-only cars.

== Europe ==
=== Germany ===
Women-only compartments were introduced on the Leipzig-to-Chemnitz regional train in 2016. Reactions from passengers were mixed. While some welcomed the measure as it made women feel safer, others thought that separating genders was "something from the past" and a "backward solution". It is now gone.

=== United Kingdom ===
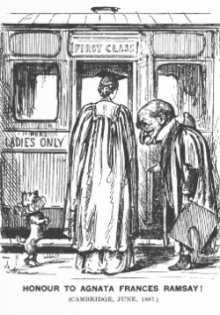
In 1887, Punch magazine published a cartoon by George du Maurier about Agnata Butler's examination success at Classical Studies. She was the only person in the first class of the Classical Tripos at Cambridge University that year, placing her above all the men. Here, Mr Punch (the magazine's mascot) ushers her into a first class compartment which is for ladies only.

The last "Ladies Only" accommodation in British trains was withdrawn in 1977, due to a combination of different train types being introduced and equality legislation which prevented gender-specific provisions.

On the old type of local trains, no longer operating, individual compartments of the traditional type were right across the carriage (typically 9 or so per carriage), with no corridor, bench seats for 5 or so on each side, and access only through many individual side doors. Because of concerns from individual women passengers who might be left with men in the compartment as passengers alighted, a few compartments (typically the end one in each train unit) were labelled as Ladies Only. At a time when No Smoking compartments were denoted by red window labels, and First Class by blue labels, the Ladies Only compartments were shown by green window labels.

In September 2014, Parliamentary Under Secretary for Transport Claire Perry MP mentioned a possible revival of the women-only carriages during a speech to a fringe event at the Conservative Party conference. In August 2015, Labour leadership candidate Jeremy Corbyn said he would consult on the option of introducing women-only carriages to help reduce harassment. Labour MP Geraint Davies said that the proposed system would become like apartheid.

== See also ==
- Feminist separatism
- Gender apartheid
- Sex segregation
- Women-only space
