= Dorothy Tarrant =

British classical scholar

- Tarrant in 1949
- Born: 7 May 1885; Wandsworth, London, England
- Died: 4 September 1973 (aged 88); Balham, London, England
- Education: Clapham High School; Girton College; Bedford College, London
- Occupation: Classical scholar
- Known for: first female Professor of Greek in Britain

Dorothy Tarrant (1885–1973) was a British classical scholar, specialising in Plato. She was the first female Professor of Greek in the United Kingdom, teaching at Bedford College, London from 1909 to 1950. She researched the work of Plato, pioneering the use of stylistic analysis to conclude that he had not written all the work previously attributed to him. She was active in the Classical Association and became its first woman president in 1958. She was also an active Unitarian and campaigned especially against alcohol, becoming the president of the Unitarian Temperance Association, the Unitarian Assembly and the Unitarian College.

== Early life and education ==
Dorothy Tarrant was the daughter of a Unitarian minister, the Reverend William Tarrant, who edited The Enquirer – the fortnightly newspaper of that denomination. His wife, Alice née Stanley, gave birth to her on 7 May 1885 in Wandsworth. She was educated at home before attending Wandsworth high school from 1895 and the Clapham High School from 1898. She sat the external examination of London University for Classics while still at school, placing in the first class. She then won a scholarship to Girton College, Cambridge which she attended from 1904, reading for the Classical Tripos. She passed parts one and two in 1907 and 1908, achieving first class honours in both. She also won the Agnata Butler prize, the Therese Montefiore prize and the Gilchrist fellowship for research. As Cambridge University did not grant degrees to women, she took her bachelor's degree at Bedford College, London, which had been founded as a ladies' college by Unitarian women. She graduated in 1906 and then took her master's degree three years later for her thesis on the genesis of Plato's theory of ideas. Her doctorate was awarded by London University much later in 1930.

== Classical scholarship ==
Tarrant was appointed to the faculty of Bedford College in 1909, progressing from assistant lecturer to lecturer in 1921 and university reader in 1929. In 1936, after her doctorate, she became head of the department and Professor of Ancient Greek – the first woman to hold such a post for this subject in Britain. She retired in 1950 to become a professor emerita and honorary fellow of Bedford College. She became an honorary fellow of Girton College in 1955 and Manchester College, Oxford in 1969. She served as President of the Hellenic Society in 1953–56.

She was a frequent contributor to learned journals including The Classical Quarterly and The Journal of Hellenic Studies. Her work especially focussed upon Plato and she analysed his style in detail, concluding that the Hippias Major – the Socratic dialogue on the nature of beauty – must have been written by another author.

She was involved with the Classical Association for many years, from reading a paper on The Art of Plato to the London branch in 1926 to becoming the first female President in 1958, at the age of 73. The association's annual general meeting was held in Nottingham that year, where she gave the presidential address, The Long Line of Torchbearers, which recounted many writers of the classics, illustrating this by comparing how translators such as Alexander Pope and Andrew Lang had translated the Odyssey. She also lectured to the general public, from passengers on Mediterranean cruises to the women convicts at Holloway prison.

== Dorothy Tarrant Fellowship ==
In 2016 an annual Fellowship with special lecture was established in honour of Tarrant, a 'pioneering figure in UK classics', at the Institute of Classical Studies, University of London. The Fellowship is awarded to academics from universities outside of the UK with research interests in any aspect of classical studies. Recipients for 2017-18 include Professor Anthony Corbeill (University of Virginia) and Professor Joshua Katz (Princeton University). Recipients for 2018-19 include Professor Margaret Malamud (New Mexico State University) and Professor Sara Monoson (Northwestern University). Professor Ann Brysbaert (Leiden University) and Professor Judith Evans Grubbs (Emory University) were Dorothy Tarrant Fellows in 2019-20, and Professor Johannes Baltussen (University of Adelaide) and Professor Patricia A. Rosenmeyer (University of North Carolina at Chapel Hill) are Dorothy Tarrant Fellows for 2020- 21.

== Personal life and religion ==
Tarrant was a devout Unitarian like her father, campaigning especially against alcohol. She was the president of the Unitarian Temperance Association from 1948 to 1951 and then president of the Unitarian Assembly from 1952 to 1953. She attended the Unitarian College, Manchester from 1955 to 1958 and was its president from 1961 to 1963. Her final years were spent in Wandsworth but she was still active in old age and she died aged 88 of pneumonia at St James' Hospital, Balham on 4 September 1973.

== Publications ==
- Tarrant, Dorothy (1926), "The Art of Plato", The Classical Review, 40 (33): 104–112, doi:10.1017/S0009840X00031309, S2CID 163926083
- The Hippias Major Attributed to Plato, Cambridge University Press, 1928
- Tarrant, Dorothy (1938), "The Pseudo-Platonic Socrates", The Classical Quarterly, 32 (3–4): 167–173, doi:10.1017/s0009838800025866, S2CID 170348651
- Tarrant, Dorothy (1946), "Colloquialisms, Semi-Proverbs, and Word-Play in Plato", The Classical Quarterly, 40 (3–4): 109–117, doi:10.1017/s0009838800023430, S2CID 170719255
- "Unitarians and Bedford College", Transactions of the Unitarian Historical Society, 9 (4): 201, 1950
- Tarrant, Dorothy (1955), "Plato as Dramatist", The Journal of Hellenic Studies, 75: 82–89, doi:10.2307/629173, JSTOR 629173, S2CID 162274957
- What Unitarians Believe (PDF), London: Lindsey Press, 1963
