= Caroline Skeel =

British historian (1872–1951)

Caroline Skeel FRHistS
- Skeel in 1919
- Born: Caroline Anne James Skeel; 9 February 1872; Hampstead, England
- Died: 25 February 1951 (aged 79); Hendon, England

Academic background
- Education: Girton College, Cambridge

Academic work
- Discipline: History
- Institutions: Westfield College

Caroline Anne James Skeel FRHistS (9 February 1872 – 25 February 1951) was a British historian. She was a professor of history at Westfield College, and is remembered for her work in Welsh social and economic history. The library at Westfield was named after her in 1971.

== Early years and education ==
Skeel was born in Hampstead, London, the sixth of the seven children of William James Skeel (1822–1899), a physician and wealthy investor, and Anne (1831–1895). Both parents came from Pembrokeshire, Wales – her father being from Castle Hill in the parish of Haycastle, and her mother's parents came from Clarbeston. Skeel studied at a private school, and spent three years in South Hampstead High School and Notting Hill High School between 1884 and 1890. With 12 others from Notting Hill High School, she studied at Girton College, Cambridge, having entered in 1891. At Girton, she was a St. Dunstan's Exhibitioner, and graduated with a first in both classics and history. A successful student, she was given the Agnata Butler Prize in 1893 and 1894, and the Thérèsa Montefiore Memorial Prize in her last year at Girton in 1895.

In 1926 she was awarded a Master of Arts degree.

== Career ==
After graduating from Girton, Skeel was appointed as a history teacher at Westfield College, London. While teaching there she published her first work, Travel in the First Century A.D., in 1901. She became known for her research into Welsh history, of which her The Council in the Marches of Wales: A study in local government in the sixteenth and seventeenth centuries (1904) was notable. Much of her research delved into aspects of Welsh social and economic history which were poorly covered at the time.

Skeel assumed responsibility for the college's library beginning in 1902. In 1907, she fell into ill health and was absent from Westfield for a period but after her return, she took over as Head of Department from 1911 to 1919. She was Reader and Head of Department from 1919 to 1925 and University Professor of history from 1925 to 1929. In 1924, she published an article on the Wool industry of Wales, and contributed a chapter to a book on Wales under Henry VII by R. W. Seton-Watson. In 1926 she submitted The Cattle Trade Between England and Wales in the 15th to 18th Centuries to the Royal Historical Society.

== Memberships ==
Skeel was a Fellow of the Royal Historical Society from 1914 to 1928, serving on its Council and Publications Committee from 1921 to 1927. She was a member of the Classical Association, the Historical Association, and the Cymmrodorion Society.

== Awards and honors ==
In 1914 she was a recipient of the Henry Hutchison Medal, and the Gamble Prize for producing an essay on the works of Sir John Fortescue.

== Later life and legacy ==
She retired in 1929 to 34 Heald Crescent in Hendon, where, despite her significant wealth, she lived modestly. She died in February 1951, leaving an estate worth £269,386, of which a large sum was bequeathed to numerous Christian charities and Westfield College.

The library at Westfield (currently the Queen Mary University of London) was named the Caroline Skeel Library when it was established in 1971.
