= Margaret Malamud =

Professor of Ancient History and Islamic Studies, New Mexico State University

Academic background
- Education: Boston University, University of California, Berkeley

Academic work
- Discipline: Classics Classical reception studies
- Institutions: New Mexico State University
- Notable works: African Americans and the Classics: Antiquity, Abolition and Activism; Ancient Rome and Modern America

Margaret Irene Malamud is Professor of Ancient History and Islamic Studies at New Mexico State University. Malamud is known in particular for her work on classical reception in the United States.

== Career ==
Malamud studied Classics and Islamic Studies at Boston University, graduating with a BA in 1980. She continued her studies at the University of California, Berkeley completing her MA in Near Eastern Studies in 1983 and her PhD in 1990. Following two years as a Post-Doctoral Fellow and Lecturer in History at Stanford University, Malamud joined the faculty of New Mexico State University in 1992 as Assistant Professor of Ancient History and Islamic Studies. She became Associate Professor in 1998 and Professor of Ancient History and Islamic Studies in 2009. Malamud is Director Graduate Studies and S.P. and Margaret Manasse Research Chair in the College of Arts and Sciences.

Malamud has received a number of grants from the National Endowment for the Humanities, most recently for the project Black Minerva: African Americans and the Classics which resulted in her 2019 book African Americans and the Classics: Antiquity, Abolition and Activism. She has also received grants for projects including Understanding Islam: Infusing Islamic Studies into the undergraduate Humanities Curriculum and The Uses and the Abuses of Roman Antiquity in American Culture, the latter resulting in her 2009 book Ancient Rome and Modern America.

Malamud's 2019 book African Americans and the Classics: Antiquity, Abolition and Activism has been widely received as a fundamental step in the study of classics in the United States. Malamud's work draws together the evidence for the use of classics and classical education in the fight for the abolition of slavery and the social and economic emancipation of African Americans.

Malamud is currently working on the reception of antiquity in the United States, including the 1610 epic poem, Historia de la Nueva México, by Gaspar Pérez de Villagrá, which contains extensive reference to the work of Virgil, Homer, and Lucan.

Malamud was the Dorothy Tarrant Fellow at the Institute of Classical Studies, London March–June 2019. She delivered the Dorothy Tarrant Memorial lecture on 13 May 2019 entitled, Antiquity, Abolition, and Activism in Nineteenth Century American Visual Arts.

== Selected publications ==
- African Americans and the Classics: Antiquity, Abolition and Activism (London: I.B. Tauris Publishers, 2019).
- “‘A Kind of Moral Gladiatorship’: Abolitionist Uses of the Classics.” Arion: A Journal of Humanities and the Classics 23.2 (2015): 57-90.
- “An African in a Toga: Joseph Cinqué and the Roman Rhetoric of the American Revolution.” Classical World 108.4 (2015): 525–35.
- “Classics as a Weapon: African Americans and the Fight for Inclusion in American Democracy.” In Classics in the Modern World, edited by Lorna Hardwick and Stephen Harrison, 89–103. Oxford: Oxford University Press, 2013.
- Ancient Rome and Modern America (Oxford and Malden: Wiley-Blackwell Press, 2009).
- eds. Sandra R. Joshel, Margaret Malamud, and Donald McGuire, Jr. Imperial Projections: Ancient Rome in Modern Popular Culture (Baltimore: The Johns Hopkins University Press, 2001).
