= S. Sara Monoson =

American political scientist

S. Sara Monoson (b. 1960) is Professor of Political Science, Classics and Philosophy at Northwestern University. She specialises in the history of political theory, politics in ancient Greece, and classical receptions.

== Education ==
Monoson received an MSc in political philosophy from the London School of Economics, and a BA from Brandeis University. She was awarded her PhD from Princeton University.

== Research ==
Monoson's monograph, Plato's Democratic Entanglements: Athenian Politics and the Practice of Philosophy, was based on her doctoral thesis and was published by Princeton University Press in 2000. It was awarded the 2001 American Political Science Association’s Best First Book Award.

Monoson was Dorothy Tarrant Fellow at the Institute of Classical Studies, University of London, 2018–19.

== Selected bibliography ==
- Plato's Democratic Entanglements: Athenian Politics and the Practice of Philosophy (Princeton: Princeton University Press, 2000)
- 'Socrates’ Military Service, Our Ancient Wars, edited by Victor Caston and Silke-Maria Weineck (Michigan: University of Michigan Press, 2016)
- 'Aesop Said So: Ancient Wisdom and Radical Politics in 1930s NY', Classical Receptions Journal, 2016, Vol 8, Issue 1, 90–113
- (co-authored with Laura Lodewyck) 'Performing for Soldiers: 21st Century Experiments in Greek Theater in the US', The Oxford Handbook of Greek Drama in the Americas, edited by Kathryn Bosher, Fiona Mcintosh, Justine McConnell and Patrice Rankine, (Oxford: Oxford University Press, 2015)
