= Ida Baumann =

Swiss painter (1864–1932)

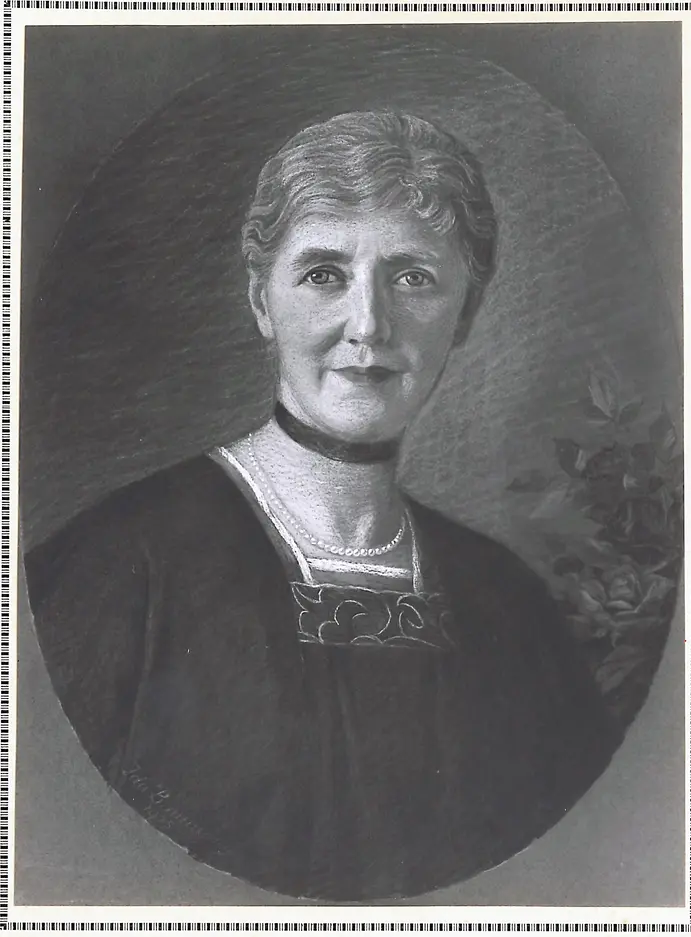
Self-portrait

Ida Baumann (12 March 1864 – 24 August 1932) was a Swiss painter from Herisau in the canton of Appenzell Ausserrhoden. She trained in St. Gallen, Darmstadt, and Paris, where she exhibited at the Paris Salon. She specialised in portraiture, worked in England and London in the early 1890s, and later settled in Basel. Her work included portraits and scenes of everyday life.

== Biography ==
Baumann was born in Herisau on 12 March 1864. She trained first at the Gewerbeschule St. Gallen, then studied in Darmstadt from 1884, before continuing her training in Paris at the Académie Colarossi from 1885. During her years in Paris, she exhibited at the Paris Salon on multiple occasions.

She developed an early focus on portraiture. After a commission took her to England in 1888, she moved there in 1890 and worked as a portrait painter in England and Scotland. In 1891, she established herself in London, where she rented the studio of the painter John Collier and worked for members of the English nobility.

In 1894, illness disrupted her work. She returned to Switzerland in 1896, and after further stays in Paris and periods of medical treatment, settled in Basel in 1900. She lived there until shortly before her death, spending her final years mainly on the Italian Riviera and in Heiden, where she died on 24 August 1932.

== Works ==
Baumann painted portraits and scenes of everyday life. She also painted portraits of Landammänner, cantonal political office-holders, in the late 19th and early 20th centuries. Another work now in the Kantonsbibliothek Appenzell Ausserrhoden is Melanie Tanner-Winterhalter, an oil portrait dated between 1886 and 1893. The painting was donated to the library in 2019. Her work was included in the 2020–21 exhibition Berufswunsch Malerin! at the Historisches und Völkerkundemuseum St. Gallen.

== Gallery ==
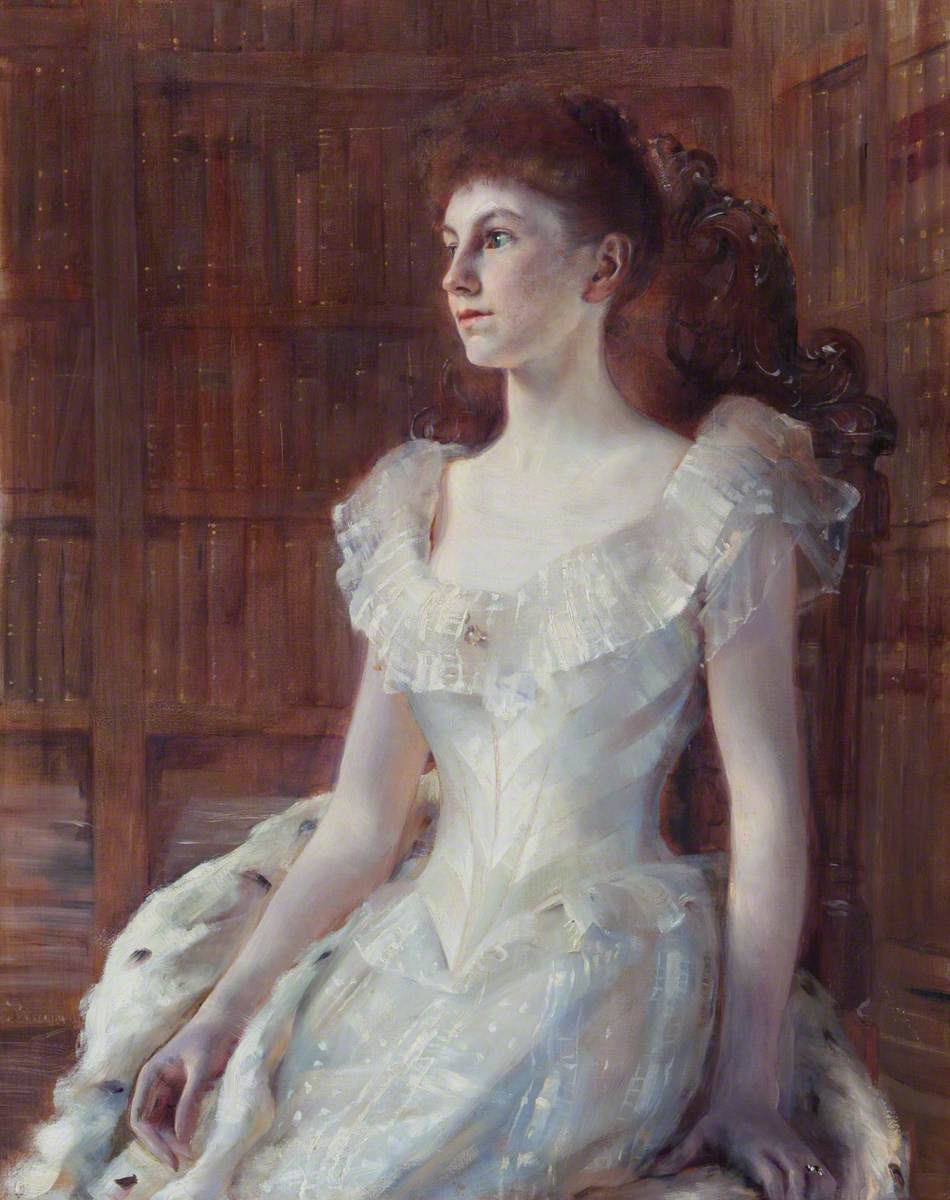
Agnata Ramsay

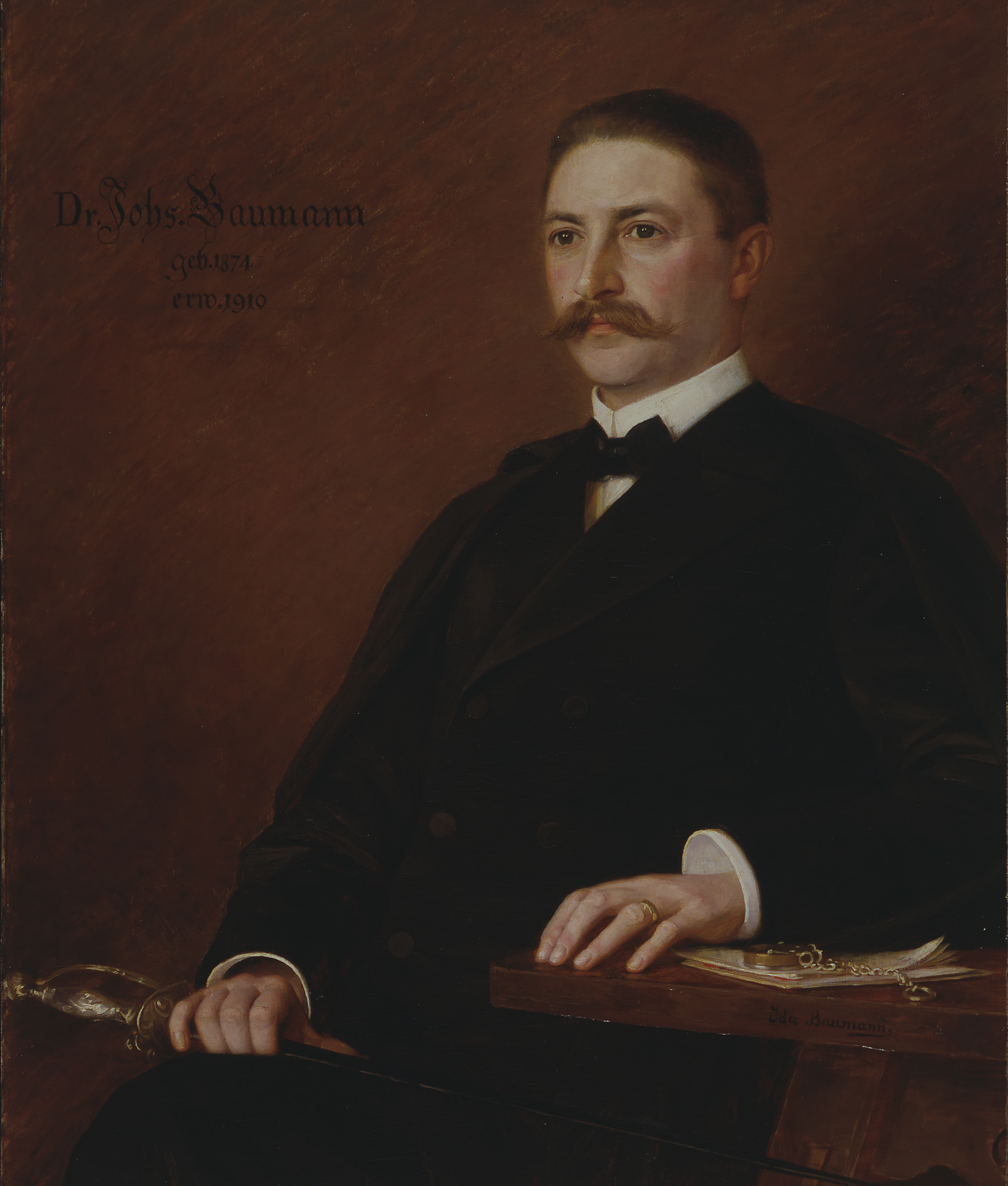

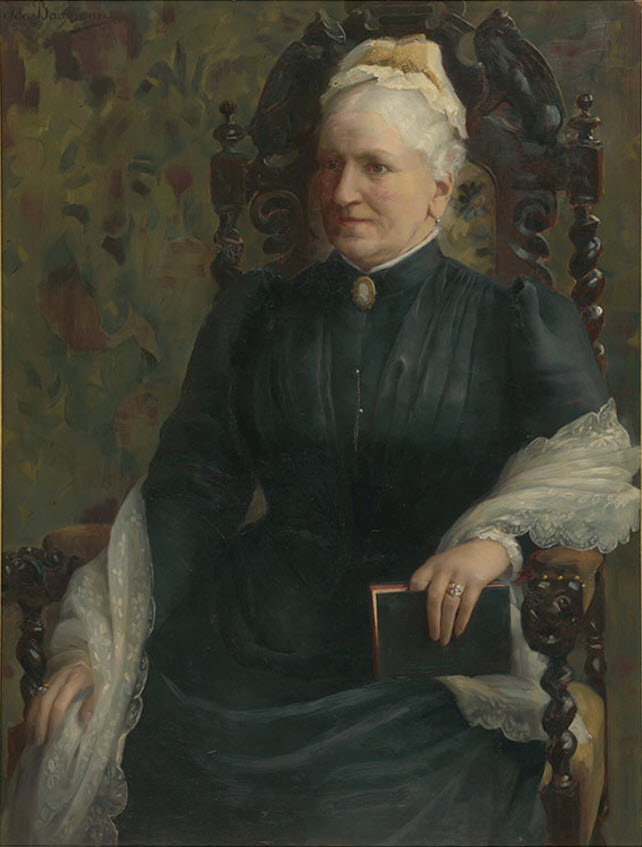

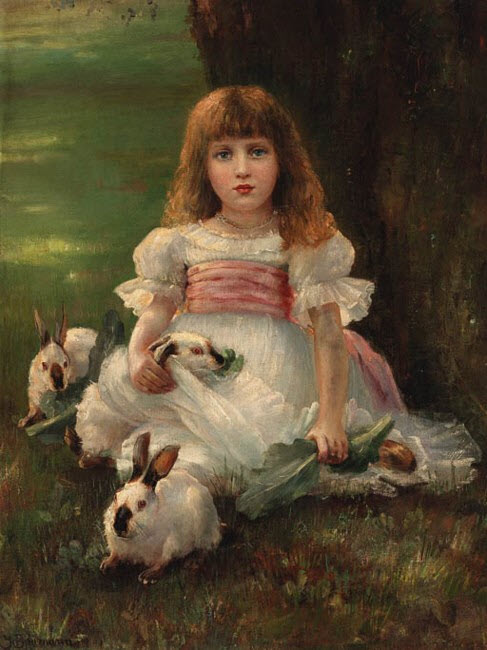
