= Agnata Butler =

British classicist (1867–1931)

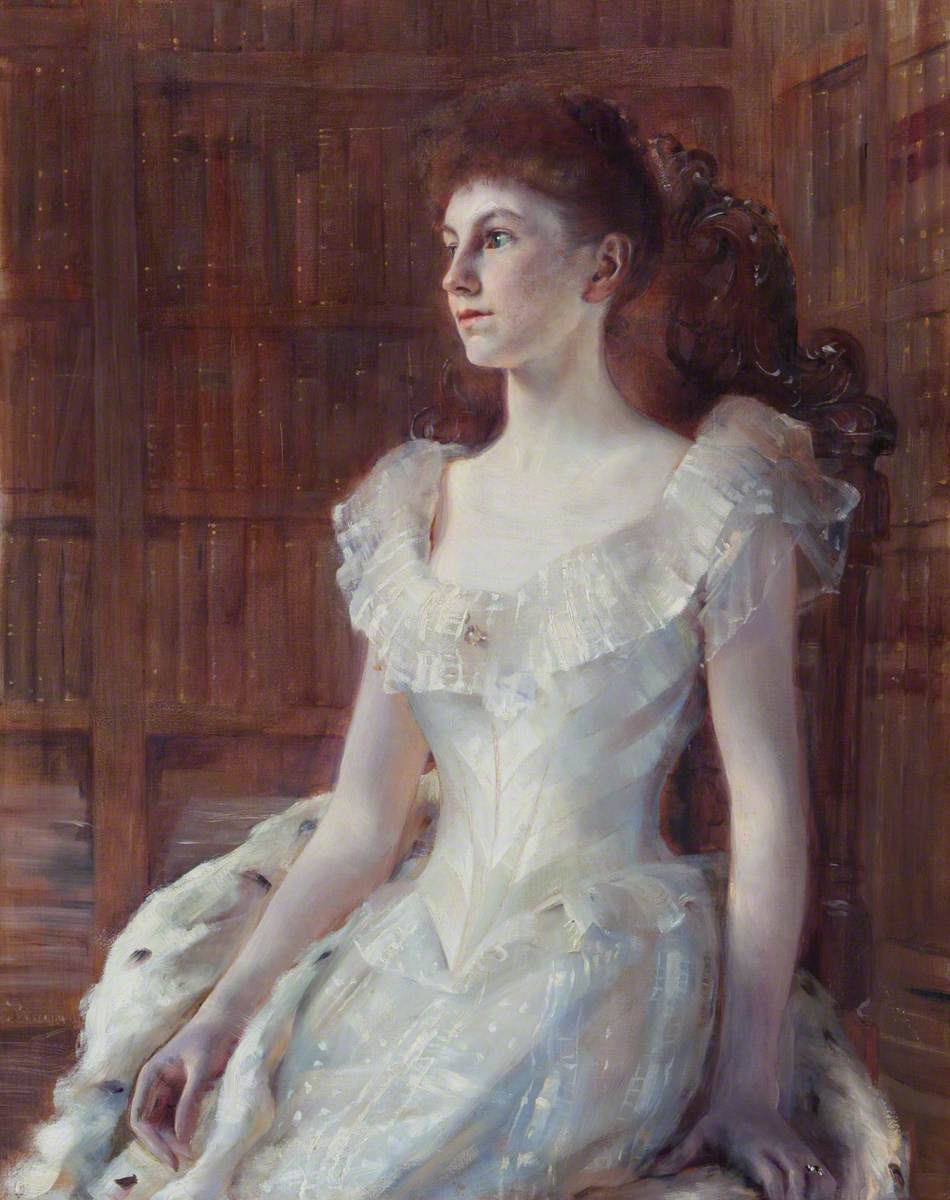
- Portrait of her as a student at Girton College, by Ida Baumann
- Born: Agnata Frances Ramsay; 28 January 1867; Marylebone
- Died: 27 May 1931 (aged 64); Harrow on the Hill
- Education: St Leonards School; Girton College
- Occupation: First Lady
- Organization: Trinity College, Cambridge
- Known for: first in the Classical Tripos

Agnata Frances Butler (née Ramsay; 28 January 1867 – 27 May 1931) was a British classics scholar. She was among the first generation of women to take the Classical Tripos examinations at the University of Cambridge, and was the only person to be placed in the top division of the first class at the end of her third year, in 1887. She married the Master of Trinity College, Henry Montagu Butler, in August 1888, becoming the leading hostess in Cambridge. She published a version of Book VII of Herodotus' Histories in 1891.

== Early life and education ==
Punch published a cartoon by George du Maurier about her examination success. As she was the only person in the first class of the Classical Tripos that year, placing above all the men, Mr Punch and his dog Toby are shown ushering her into a first class compartment which is for ladies only.

She was born Agnata Ramsay in London on 28 January 1867, the daughter of Sir James Ramsay, 10th Baronet, of Bamff, and his wife Mary Elizabeth Charlotte, née Scott-Kerr. She came from a family with a history of academic achievement as her father published books on history, her uncle George Gilbert Ramsay was a professor of humanity at Glasgow University and her grandfather, Sir George Ramsay, published works on philosophy.

Brought up in Perthshire, she attended St Leonards School in St Andrews. In 1884, she went as the Misses Metcalfes' Scholar to Girton College, Cambridge, where she read Classics. Her achievement in being the only candidate in 1887 to be placed in the top division of the first class in the Classical Tripos examinations – thereby being placed above all of the men in her year – was marked with a cartoon in Punch which was entitled 'Honour to Agnata Frances Ramsay' and showed her boarding a train's first-class compartment marked 'For Ladies Only'.

== Personal life ==
The second du Maurier cartoon in Punch about the 'crib for Herodotus'

While a student, she worked hard at her studies but also found time for outdoor pursuits which she enjoyed, including tennis and skating. She was president of the debating society and, while she did not speak often, she impressed others with her eloquence and humility.

In August 1888, she married the Master of Trinity, Henry Montagu Butler. She was aged 21, and he was 55. They had met at the Cambridge Greek Play, a performance of Oedipus Rex in November 1887 for which Butler had arranged a large party of 42. He had included Agnata because of her prowess in the classics but he later wrote that it was her "goodness ... not her Greek and Latin, which have stolen my heart". Even so, he allowed that, on their honeymoon, they "read a great deal of Greek together".

They had three sons, James, Gordon, and Nevile. Their first child was born while she was working on her edition of Herodotus, which prompted Punch to run another punning cartoon, in which she was portrayed as ordering 'a crib for Herodotus'. James became an academic, and was Regius Professor of Modern History at Cambridge University; Gordon was killed in action in Egypt in 1916; Nevile became a diplomat, serving as British Ambassador to Brazil and to the Netherlands.

After the death of her husband in 1918, she remained in Cambridge, where she was involved in the local Christian Science church. She died in Harrow on 27 May 1931.

== Classical scholarship ==
At Cambridge, she worked on a version of Book VII (Polymnia) of Herodotus' Histories. It was published in the original Ancient Greek with notes in 1891, as part of Macmillan's Classical series for colleges and schools. She may have been the first British woman to produce an edition of a classical author. In 2006, Mary Beard wrote that "Agnata Ramsey was one of the most notorious casualties of the university marriage market", as she "did very little classics ever after".

Her husband was friends with the poet laureate, Alfred, Lord Tennyson and, in 1892, the couple visited his home of Farringford House, where she and Tennyson discussed classical works such as the Alcaics of Horace and Sappho. She recalled his scepticism about the recent discovery of Troy,

Then we spoke of Schliemann, of whom I had just been reading in Schuchhardt's book, and he said he had no faith in him. 'How could a great city have been built on a little ridge like that (meaning Hissarlik)? Where would have been the room for Priam's fifty sons and fifty daughters?'

Another famous classicist was A. E. Housman who wrote in 1911 to thank her after a visit,

Dear Mrs Butler,

I have been solacing my journey home with your son's excellent verses which the Master was good enough to give me. Oxford men, following Dryden, sometimes refer to Cambridge as Thebes. Trinity Lodge, at any rate, seems to me a happy combination of Athens and Sybaris.

I am yours sincerely
A. E. Housman

== Prize ==
A prize for the best classics students in their second or third year was established and awarded by the Butlers – the Agnata Butler Prize. Winners included Caroline Skeel (1893/4), Dorothy Tarrant (1907) and Barbara Wootton (1917).
