= Pink rickshaw =

Indian government program

A pink rickshaw (also known as pink auto) is an alternative to normal auto rickshaws for female passengers in some cities of India. This initiative was taken by the Government of India to prevent women from being harassed and mistreated while commuting in rickshaws. Special features like panic buttons and GPS tracking systems are installed for the safety of women. Pink rickshaws are either fully pink in color or have pink roofs. They were initially launched in 2013 in Ranchi to safeguard women commuters against sexual assaults and rapes. Eventually it was introduced in many other cities in India. The autos are driven by trained professionals, either men or women, after completion of legal verification and documentation.

== Women's empowerment ==
The pink rickshaw scheme was initiated by the Ranchi government for improving the condition of women. By providing women safe transportation, the Ranchi government is empowering women, enabling them to work and be self sufficient. Traditionally in India, men are the wage earners. Safe transportation enables women to become independent and contribute to the family income.

== Pink rickshaw operation by location ==
=== Ranchi ===
Ranchi was the first city in India to launch the pink rickshaw scheme. It was launched in 2013 for the safety of women after the 2012 Delhi gang rape. Jharkhand Police introduced around 200 pink roofed rickshaws in capital Ranchi for transportation of women passengers. These autos had special features such as panic button and GPS system for the safety of women passengers. Police tried to appoint female drivers for these rickshaws, but due to less response by females they appointed male drivers. All the male drivers were verified through standard procedures set by the government authorities. Only those who cleared were given special identity cards and were allowed to ferry women.

But this service is no longer available for women passengers only because drivers have to wait a long duration to get female passengers, due to which drivers started ferrying male passengers too in pink autos in order to make more trips in less time.

Jharkhand High Court ordered the Regional Transport Authority to get rid of all autos in the city without legal permits. Out of total 12,000 rickshaws in Ranchi, only 2,335 autos had legal permits. Out of those 2,335 autos, no pink rickshaw had the legal permit to operate. Due to the suspension of trade permits, pink rickshaw drivers went on a strike demanding the issuance of lifetime legal permits to ply the trade.

=== Surat ===
Surat Municipal Corporation launched pink auto on 2 July 2017. The corporation selected and trained women to drive automobiles as it is a service for women by women. SMC helped these women to get loans at a 7% interest rate with a benefit of 25% subsidy by Central Government to procure the rickshaw. The Municipal Corporation identified 70 women in which 15 were trained and others were under training. They have concentrated on girls' school areas for ferrying school children in the daytime.

=== Bongaigaon ===
Bongaigaon is one of the biggest commercial and industrial hubs of Assam. The National Urban Livelihood Mission (NULM) launched pink rickshaws driven by women, for the safety of women while commuting. Before women got licensed, they were trained by Dispur motor driving school for two months. There were a total of 13 rickshaws in the city providing the service from 6 am to 6 pm.

=== Odisha ===
Pink Auto Rickshaw project was launched in Bhubaneswar (capital of Odisha) on 27 June 2015 by Chief Minister of Odisha. It was introduced by the Commissioner of Odisha police to enlighten their 'We care motto' for women. The autos will be driven by men, but only those men will drive who stand to set standards by the government and will be trained to take care of female passengers in any situation. The auto is mainly for women and children to promote the safety of women commuters in city. Within a year of launch there were 353 pink autos operating in Bhubaneswar in all parts including isolated areas with a positive feedback by the women travelers. Eventually, it was also launched in Rourkela in Odisha.

=== Gurgaon ===
In 2010, for the first time pink rickshaws were launched in Gurgaon after several women were sexually assaulted by taxi drivers. Pink rickshaws did not receive a positive response from commuters at that time, which led to failure in sustaining the programme, which was soon suspended in Gurgaon.

In January 2013 pink autos were relaunched in Gurgaon by the Gurgaon Traffic Police. The decision was made due to a rape case by an Uber taxi driver and at the same time a horrific gang rape case of a paramedical student by six men in a bus in Delhi in December, 2012. This time, rickshaws were designed by keeping in mind special safety measures like panic buttons and a GPS system. The government even created an auto stand specifically for Pink Autos at MG Road Metro Station. There were 22 rickshaws launched at this time. Within a month and a half they failed to function in the city and faced a shutdown again. One of the major reasons behind the shutdown was increasing popularity of online cab services available in the city. The Deputy Commissioner of Traffic Police said that they launched rickshaws but they do not have to play any role in implementation as it depends on the market forces and how people accept it.

After facing two failures, in 2015 pink rickshaw service was relaunched with total of 61 rickshaws. The initiative was taken to reduce the number of cases of sexual harassment in the city.
