= Classical Tripos =

Degree course at the University of Cambridge

The Classical Tripos is the taught course in classics at the Faculty of Classics, University of Cambridge. It is equivalent to Literae Humaniores at Oxford University. It is traditionally a three-year degree, but for those who have not previously studied Latin and Greek, a four-year course has been introduced. It is not essential to have a Greek A-Level to study for the three-year degree as intensive Greek teaching is available, but most students will have a Latin A-Level.

Classics at Cambridge consists of language (Greek and Latin), classical literature, ancient history, classical art and archaeology, classical philosophy, and linguistics.

== Parts of the degree ==
=== Prelims to Part I ===
Taken by those doing the four-year course, this is an introduction to Latin, with Greek being taken up in Part IA.

=== Part IA ===
During the first year, undergraduates take subjects to gain a general idea of the ancient world and to discover which area is most appealing to them. Much of the work is language based; written texts are a major source of evidence for classical antiquity and so there is an emphasis in Part I on developing fluent, accurate reading skills in both Greek and Latin.

Although roughly three-quarters of the course is taken up with developing language skills, both centred on the set texts and in unseen translation, students are also expected to study literature, philosophy, history, linguistics and philology, and art and archaeology.

=== Part IB ===
There is a wider choice in the second year and undergraduates narrow down their field of study. While they have to study Language and Literature, the choice of Literature is wider, and they choose two out of History, Art and Archaeology, Philosophy and Linguistics.

=== Part II ===
Part II gives the widest choice. It is possible to completely focus on one subject, or to choose a broad range of subjects. Candidates take four papers, although one of these papers may be substituted by a 10,000-word thesis.

== History ==
The classical tripos was created in 1822 for students who had high honours in mathematics or those who were the sons of peers. This restriction ended around 1850.

=== Women ===
Women were first allowed to sit the examination at the end of the nineteenth century.

In 1887, Agnata Butler (née Ramsay), a student at Girton College, was the only candidate to be placed in the top division of the first class in Classical Tripos examinations – thereby being placed above all of the men in her year. It was marked with a cartoon in Punch which was entitled 'Honour to Agnata Frances Ramsay' and showed her boarding a train's first-class compartment marked 'For Ladies Only'.

== Sources ==
- Beard, Mary (25 January 2017), "The struggles of clever women", The Times Literary Supplement
- Dash, Mike (28 October 2011), The Woman Who Bested the Men at Math, Smithsonian Institution
- Muller, Aislinn (2014), The history of Girton College, archived from the original on 7 December 2017
