= Cleo Rickman Fitch =

American archaeological researcher

- Born: June 16, 1910; Carlsbad, Texas
- Died: January 15, 1995 (aged 84); Manhattan, New York
- Education: Peaabody College, Watkins Institute of Art
- Notable work: The Lamps of Costa
- Spouse: James Marston Fitch

Cleo Rickman Fitch (June 16, 1910 – January 15, 1995) was an American archaeological researcher who specialized in Roman lamps.

== Early life and education ==
Cleo Rickman Fitch was born on June 16, 1910, in Carlsbad, Texas. Her father was a doctor for Southern Pacific Railroad. While living in Carlsbad, he diagnosed himself with incurable diabetes and moved the family moved back to his hometown of Chapel Hill, Tennessee. Soon after arriving in Tennessee, Fitch's father died and her mother supported the family by teaching school.

Fitch obtained her bachelor's degree at Peabody College in Nashville, Tennessee, studying art and art history. She continued her art education at Watkins Institute of Art in Nashville. She married the architect James Marston Fitch in 1936. In 1945, the couple moved to New York City, where James Fitch took a teaching job at Columbia University. During World War II, Fitch worked for the Army as an industrial draftsman.

From 1953 to 1954, Cleo and James Fitch spent a year in Italy. While James Fitch studied architecture, Cleo studied art and sculpture.

== Archaeological career ==
During their year abroad, Frank Brown, Director of the American Academy in Rome, invited Fitch to join his expedition at the ancient town of Cosa, north of Rome. Fitch was assigned the task of cataloging the excavation materials, which included many terracotta lamps. With her drafting skills, she was also given the responsibility of putting together the building plans for the new museum that Brown, representing the American Academy at Rome, was having built at Cosa

Each summer for the following 21 years, Fitch made Rome her home and continued her work at the American Academy, reconstructing, drawing and cataloguing the lamp fragments from the Costa excavation site. "From the over-view of all of the lamps from the c. 700 years of the history of the site, it is possible to see the entire history of the Roman lamp industry."

In 1979, Norma Goldman of Wayne State University joined Fitch in her work. Their collaborative effort resulted in the publication of Cosa: The Lamps in 1994, part of the American Academy Series published by the University of Michigan Press. An edited volume of Cosa-related studies was produced in her honor in 2001.

Fitch died January 5, 1995, in Manhattan, New York.

== Selected bibliography ==
- Cosa: The Lamps (Memoirs of the American Academy in Rome), 1994, Ann Arbor, University of Michigan Press (co-authored with Norma Wynick Goldman)
