= Hórreos de Nerva =

The Hórreos de Nerva were a complex of granaries (hórreos) built, as indicated by their name, by or during the reign of the Roman emperor Nerva, near the Porta Ápia, between the Via Ápia and the Via Ardeatina. According to John D. Grainger, they were built or acquired by Nerva to better stock the public annona (public grain supply), and since Vespasian and Domitian did the same, he presumes that this was part of a continuous program of improvement or replacement of old warehouses.

The Hórreos de Nerva are known only from a single mention in a sepulchral inscription. They can probably be identified with the Hórreos dos Césares mentioned in a law found, but not in situ, inside the Porta Salária. Samuel Ball Platner, while also considering this possibility, states that the Hórreos dos Césares may also be associated with the Hórreos de Galba.

== Bibliography ==
- Grainger, John D. (2004). Roman Succession Crisis of AD 96-99 and the Reign of Nerva. Psychology Press. ISBN 0415349583.
- Richardson, Lawrence (1992). A New Topographical Dictionary of Ancient Rome. JHU Press. ISBN 0-8018-4300-6.
- Stambaugh, John E. (1988). The Ancient Roman City. JHU Press. ISBN 0801836921.
