= Gold Medal Award for Distinguished Archaeological Achievement =

Archaeological award

The Gold Medal Award for Distinguished Archaeological Achievement is awarded by the Archaeological Institute of America in "recognition of a scholar who has made distinguished contributions to archaeology through his or her fieldwork, publications, and/or teaching."

It is the institute's highest award. First awarded in 1965, it has been awarded annually since 1969.

== List of AIA Gold Medal winners ==
- 2027: James C. Wright
- 2026: Nancy Thomson de Grummond
- 2025: Andrea Berlin
- 2024: John McK. Camp
- 2023: Andrew F. Stewart
- 2022: Elizabeth Fentress
- 2021: Katherine M.D. Dunbabin
- 2020: Jack L. Davis, University of Cincinnati
- 2019: Curtis Runnels, Boston University
- 2018: Ian Hodder, Stanford University
- 2017: John R. Clarke, University of Texas at Austin
- 2016: Malcolm Bell III, University of Virginia
- 2015: Charles Brian Rose
- 2014: L. Hugh Sackett
- 2013: Jeremy B. Rutter
- 2012: Lawrence Richardson Jr.
- 2011: Susan Irene Rotroff
- 2010: John Humphrey
- 2009: Henry Tutwiler Wright
- 2008: James Wiseman
- 2007: Larissa Bonfante
- 2006: Maria C. Shaw and Joseph W. Shaw
- 2005: Lionel Casson
- 2004: David B. Stronach
- 2003: Philip Betancourt
- 2002: Robert McCormick Adams
- 2001: Emmett L. Bennett Jr.
- 1999: Patty Jo Watson
- 1998: Anna Marguerite McCann
- 1997: Clemency Chase Coggins
- 1996: Wilhelmina F. Jashemski
- 1995: R. Ross Holloway
- 1994: Emeline Richardson
- 1993: Charles Kaufman Williams, II
- 1992: Evelyn Byrd Harrison
- 1991: Machteld J. Mellink
- 1990: John W. Hayes
- 1989: Virginia R. Grace
- 1988: Brunilde Sismondo Ridgway and John Desmond Clark
- 1987: Dorothy Burr Thompson
- 1986: George F. Bass
- 1985: Saul S. Weinberg and Gladys Davidson Weinberg
- 1984: Margaret Thompson
- 1983: James Bennet Pritchard
- 1982: Peter H. von Blanckenhagen
- 1981: William Andrew McDonald
- 1980: John Langdon Caskey
- 1979: Dows Dunham
- 1978: George M.A. Hanfmann
- 1977: Lucy Shoe Meritt
- 1976: Edith Porada
- 1975: Eugene Vanderpool
- 1974: Margarete Bieber
- 1973: Gordon R. Willey
- 1972: Homer A. Thompson
- 1971: Robert John Braidwood
- 1970: George E. Mylonas
- 1969: Oscar Theodore Broneer, Rhys Carpenter, and William B. Dinsmoor Sr.
- 1968: Gisela M. A. Richter
- 1967: William Foxwell Albright
- 1966: Hetty Goldman
- 1965: Carl W. Blegen

== See also ==
- Gold medal
- Gold medal awards
- List of history awards
- List of archaeology awards
