= Anna Marguerite McCann =

American art historian and archaeologist (1933–2017)

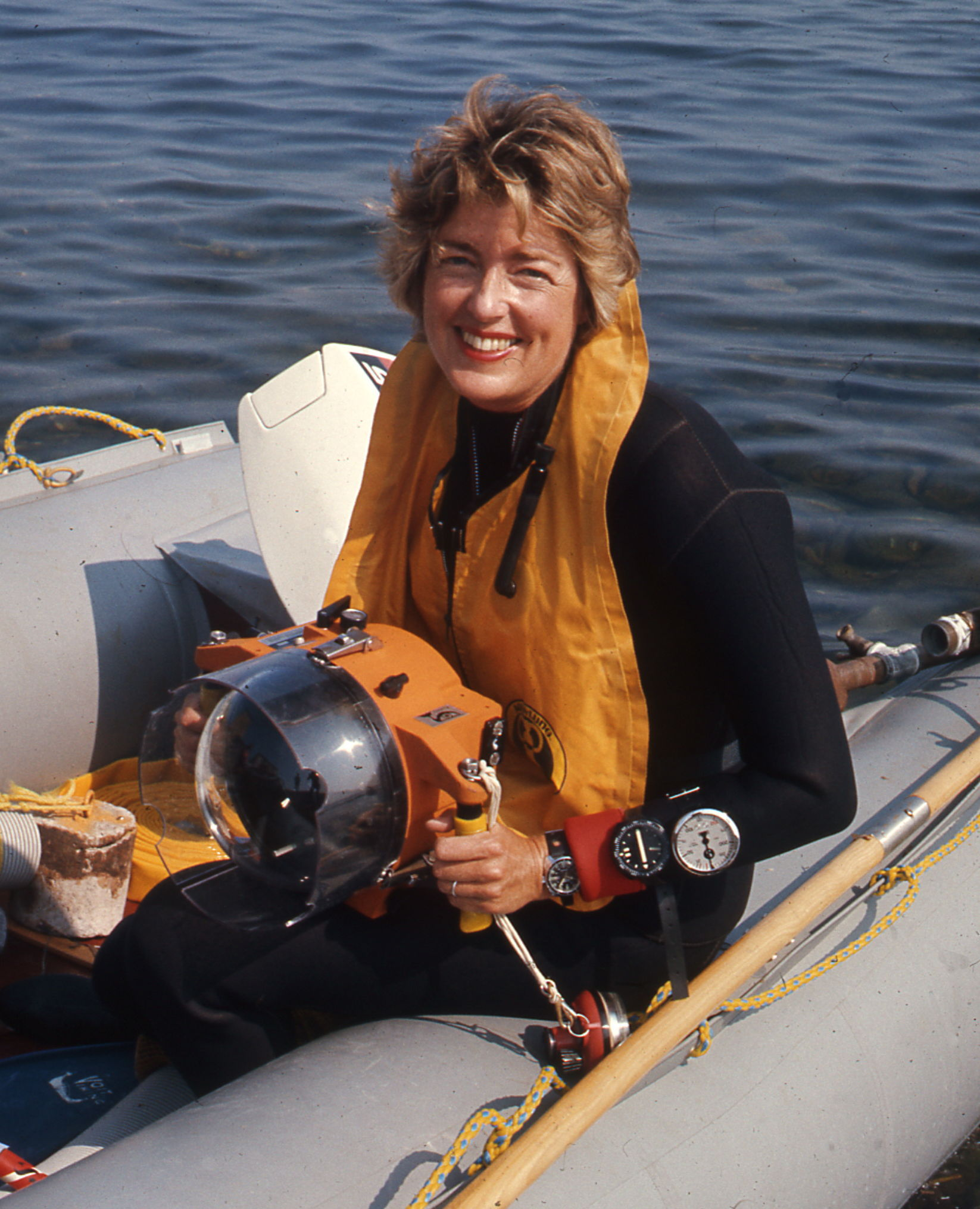
- At Populonia (Tuscany, Italy) in 1974
- Born: May 11, 1933; Mamaroneck, New York
- Died: February 12, 2017 (aged 83); Sleepy Hollow, New York
- Occupations: Underwater archaeologist, art historian
- Known for: Developing underwater archaeology as a field; First female American underwater archaeologist
- Notable work: The Portraits of Septimius Severus, A.D. 193–211 (1968); The Roman Port and Fishery of Cosa: A Center of Ancient Trade (1987); Archaeology of deep-water shipwrecks (see below)
- Awards: Fulbright Scholarship; AIA Gold Medal

Anna Marguerite McCann (May 11, 1933 – February 12, 2017) was an American art historian and archaeologist. She is known for being an early influencer—and the first American woman—in the field of underwater archaeology, beginning in the 1960s. McCann authored works pertaining to Roman art and Classical archaeology, and taught both art history and archaeology at various universities in the United States. McCann was an active member of the Archaeological Institute of America, and received its Gold Medal Award in 1998. She also published under the name Anna McCann Taggart.

== Education ==
McCann attended the Rye Country Day School in Rye, New York. In 1954, she completed a Bachelor of Arts in art history, and a minor in Classical Greek, at Wellesley College. She received a Fulbright Scholarship to attend the American School of Classical Studies at Athens for a year prior to beginning her studies toward a Master of Arts degree at New York University's Institute of Fine Arts. In 1957, she completed the M.A. with her thesis "Greek Statuary Types in Roman Historical Reliefs", marking the beginning of her interest in Roman sculpture and Classical archaeology.

In 1965, McCann obtained a Ph.D. from Indiana University in both art history and classics. Between 1964 and 1966, she was a Rome Prize Fellow at the American Academy in Rome for Classical studies and archaeology.

== Career ==
McCann began scuba diving in the early 1960s with Jacques Cousteau, exploring ancient Roman shipwrecks near Marseille. At the time, underwater archaeology was a new discipline and was "largely dominated by men." Between 1961 and 1962, she excavated the 7th-century Yassi Ada shipwreck (in Bodrum, Turkey) with the National Geographic Society and University of Pennsylvania. While at the American Academy in Rome she expanded her Master's thesis into The Portraits of Septimius Severus, A.D. 193–211. In 2017, this was still "the major scholarly work on the portraiture of that emperor" according to her colleagues. Following her time in Rome, McCann taught at the University of Missouri from 1966 to 1971, and the University of California, Berkeley from 1971 to 1974.

She was an active member of an international learned society that specializes in Roman pottery, which she became interested in as a result of her archaeological research underwater. In 1974, McCann joined the curatorial staff of the Metropolitan Museum of Art and led a lecture program related to archaeology. She published her research on Roman sculpture while at the museum in Roman Sarcophagi in the Metropolitan Museum of Art, which won the Outstanding Book Award from the Association of American University Presses and was recognized as an Outstanding Art Book by the Thomas J. Watson Library in 1978. McCann conducted excavations of Cosa (a Latin colony in Tuscany) between 1965 and 1987 that resulted in the 1987 collaborative work The Roman Port and Fishery of Cosa: A Center of Ancient Trade. This also received the Association of American University Presses' Outstanding Book Award, and the 1989 James R. Wiseman Book Award from the Archaeological Institute of America.

A member of the Archaeological Institute of America's Board of Trustees, McCann founded its Committee for Underwater Archaeology in 1985. In 1989 she became the archaeological director of the JASON Project, collaborating with oceanographer Robert Ballard in surveying multiple shipwrecks of the Skerki Bank (in the Strait of Sicily) to inspire students within the project. This resulted in a publication in 1994 that is believed to be the first to detail archaeological research conducted in deep waters. McCann and Ballard discovered more shipwrecks when they returned to Skerki Bank in 1997.

McCann was awarded the Archaeological Institute of America's Gold Medal Award in 1998 and presented with a Festschrift at the ceremony. She taught at Boston University from 1997 to 2001 and was a visiting scholar at Massachusetts Institute of Technology from 2001 to 2007.

== Personal life ==
McCann married childhood friend Robert Dorsett Taggart (d. 2016) in 1973. They lived in New York City but also spent time at their farm in Pawlet, Vermont. In 1985, McCann and Taggart established a lectureship in underwater archaeology. McCann presented her research through many venues—including a children's book that she contributed to and a general guide to some of her research—as a result of her "interest in the broad dissemination of archaeological information".

== Selected works ==
- McCann, A.M. (1968). The Portraits of Septimius Severus, A.D. 193–211. Rome: American Academy in Rome.
- McCann, Anna Marguerite (1978). Roman Sarcophagi in the Metropolitan Museum of Art. Meriden, Connecticut: Meriden Gravure Company.
- McCann, Anna Marguerite; Bourgeois, Joanne; Gazda, Elaine K.; Oleson, John Peter; Will, Elizabeth Lyding (1987). The Roman Port and Fishery of Cosa: A Center of Ancient Trade. Princeton, New Jersey: Princeton University Press. ISBN 978-0-691-62883-7.
- McCann, Anna Marguerite; Freed, Joann (1994). "Deep water archaeology: a late-Roman ship from Carthage and an ancient trade route near Skerki Bank off northwest Sicily". Journal of Roman Archaeology. Supplementary Series. Ann Arbor, Michigan: Journal of Roman Archaeology. ISSN 1063-4304.
- McCann, Anna Marguerite; Oleson, John Peter (2004). Deep-water Shipwrecks Off Skerki Bank: The 1997 Survey. Ann Arbor, Michigan: Journal of Roman Archaeology. ISBN 978-1-887829-58-8. ISSN 1063-4304.

== Sources ==
- Bispham, Edward; Harrison, Thomas; Sparkes, Brian A. (2006). Edinburgh Companion to Ancient Greece and Rome. Edinburgh University Press. ISBN 978-0-7486-1629-9.
- Oleson, John Peter; Pollini, John (October 2017). "Anna Marguerite McCann, 1933–2017" (PDF). American Journal of Archaeology. 121 (4): 685–688. doi:10.3764/aja.121.4.0685. S2CID 194566085. Archived (PDF) from the original on October 26, 2017.
