= Elizabeth Lyding Will =

American archaeologist

- Born: 1924
- Died: August 19, 2009 (aged 84–85); Amherst, Massachusetts
- Occupation: Archaeologist
- Known for: Roman amphorae studies

Elizabeth Lyding Will (born 1924, died August 19, 2009, in Amherst, Massachusetts) was an American Classical archaeologist and a leading expert on Roman amphorae. She spent her long career teaching at the University of Massachusetts, Amherst, and Amherst College.

Will earned her bachelor's degree at Miami University in Oxford, Ohio, and undertook graduate study at Bryn Mawr College, earning an M.A. and a Ph.D. Her doctoral dissertation on "Homeric enjambment" was completed in 1949.

Will is especially well known for her work on the typology of Roman amphorae. Her work on amphorae at the Latin colony of Cosa, completed jointly with Kathleen Warner Slane, appeared posthumously. She carried out analysis of amphorae from a number of archaeological contexts in the Mediterranean, including the Athenian Agora, Delos and Cosa. In addition, she studied finds from the Roman shipwreck site at Grand Congloué.

== Sources ==
- Elizabeth Lyding Will, Information about the life, works and legacy of EL Will
- [necrology] Nicholas K. Rauh. 2010. "Elizabeth Lyding Will, 1924–2009." American Journal of Archaeology 114.3: 547–8. DOI: 10.3764/aja.114.3.547
- [obituary] "Obituary: Elizabeth L. Will, professor emeritus of classics and authority on amphoras". August 25, 2009
