= Bernard Goldman =

American art historian (1922–2006)

Bernard Goldman (1922 – 2006) was an art historian and archeologist specializing in ancient Near Eastern art and archeology. He was the author of several books including The Sacred Portal, Reading and Writing in the Arts, and The Ancient Arts of Western and Central Asia. Goldman received his PhD from the University of Michigan and was a professor of art history at Wayne State University. Goldman was an expert in ancient Persian art and spent a great deal of his time in Iran. Goldman was a friend and colleague of Donald Wilber. Goldman was married to Norma Goldman, a classicist, Latin scholar and professor who authored many books including the best selling Latin textbook, Latin Via Ovid.
