= Cosa =

Ancient Roman city

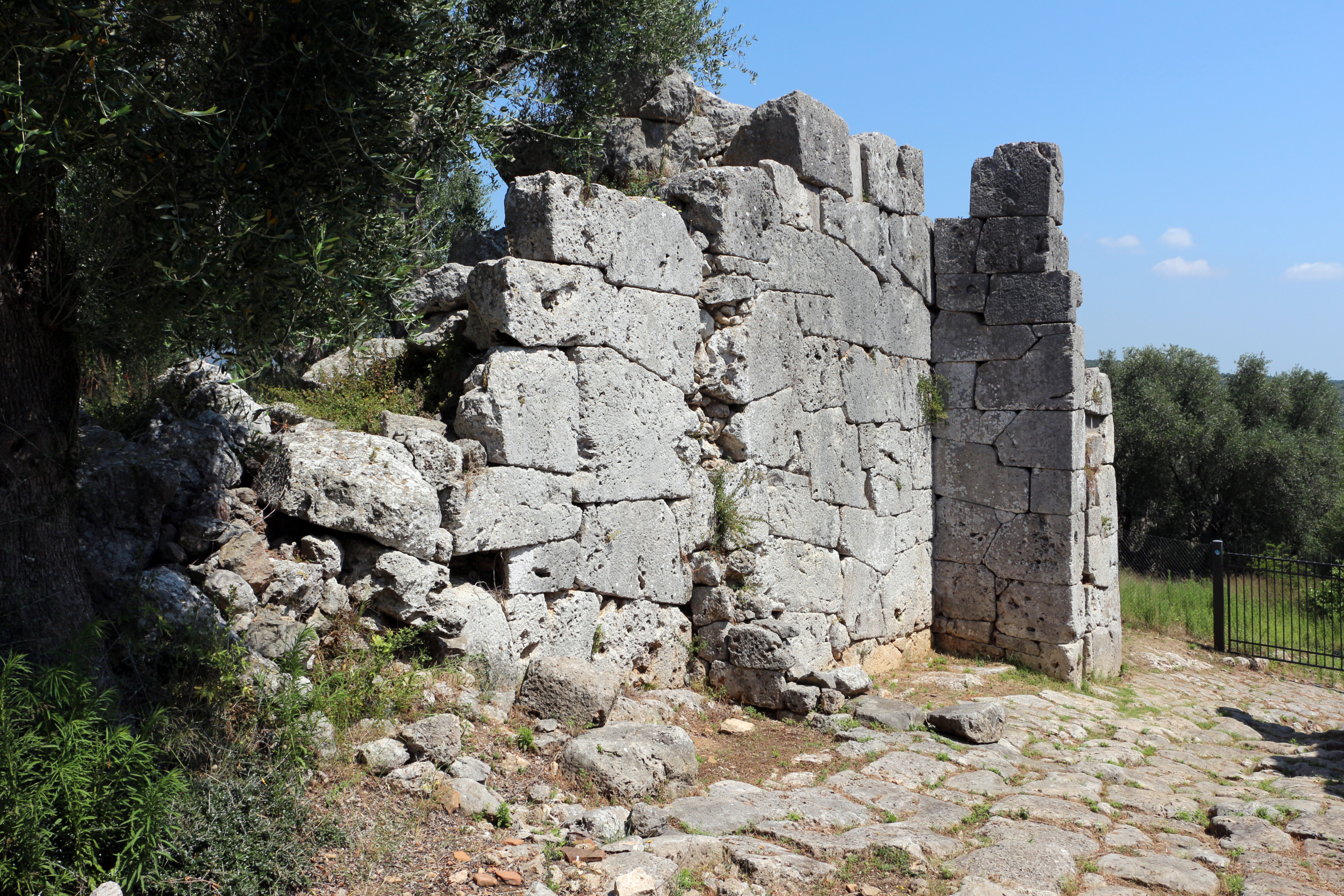
- Cyclopean city wall and gate

- Location within Tuscany Location within Italy
- 42°24′39.3078″N 11°17′11.4102″E
- Type: Settlement
- Periods: Roman Republic, Roman Empire
- Cultures: Ancient Rome
- Location: Ansedonia, Italy
- Region: Province of Grosseto

History
- Built: 273 BC
- Abandoned: after AD 1329

Site notes
- Excavation dates: 1948–54, 1965–72, 1990s, 2010s
- Archaeologists: Frank E. Brown, Elizabeth Fentress, Russell T. Scott Jr., Andrea U. De Giorgi
- Condition: ruined
- Public access: yes
- Website: Ansedonia - Città di Cosa; Museo Archeologico Nazionale di Cosa (in Italian)

Cosa was an ancient Roman city near the present Ansedonia in southwestern Tuscany, Italy. Its substantial remains are situated on a hill 113 m above sea level and 140 km northwest of Rome on the Tyrrhenian Sea coast.

== History ==
=== Republican era ===
The original Etruscan town of Cusi or Cosia may have been where modern Orbetello stands as evidenced by the massive fortification wall in polygonal masonry still standing on Orbetello's lagoon. After the defeat of Etruscan Vulci by the Romans and the confiscation of its territory in 280 BC, the Roman reorganisation of the area centred on the establishment of Cosa as a Latin colony in 273 BC on the Ager Cosanus, land confiscated from the defeated Etruscans, to solidify the control of the Romans and offer the Republic a protected port. It is now evident that the availability of the port was the chief reason for this choice of location and for the later prosperity the whole region at its peak in the last two centuries of the Republic.

Construction of the walls, gates, roads and drains was all achieved in this first phase. The town was linked to Rome by the Via Aurelia from about 241 BC. There was a break in the creation of public works in 225 BC due to Gallic raids.

The Second Punic War (218 to 201 BC), in which Hannibal had left a trail of devastation across Italy, affected the town like many Latin colonies, despite its strategic position. The rich bought up both public land and the small farms of the poor.

The colony required a new colonisation which occurred in 197 BC after which most of the civil construction has been shown by archaeology to have begun, marking a flourishing urban development. Eight atrium houses were built around the Forum in the 170s.

Cosa prospered until it suffered a crisis in the Roman Republican civil wars; the city was sacked in 70 BC, and much of the colony was restored unevenly. Atrium houses 7 and 8 were not rebuilt, but 1 to 5 were. In the 60s BC it became depopulated. The difference with the surrounding ager which experienced its peak economic development at this time is stark: as part of land redistribution, a group of large villas were built in the area, run by slave labour for olive oil and wine production, similar to the latifundia estates typical of southern Italy. These villas included nearby Settefinestre, the largest at "Le Colonne" (Capalbio), "La Provinia", and one at the port of Cosa.

=== Imperial era ===
Cosa was partially rebuilt under Augustus: the Forum and the Acropolis were restored, but only some areas around the Forum show evidence of occupation. The mainstay of the economy was probably fish farming, certainly practised in the lagoon.

Cosa appears to have been affected by an earthquake in 51 AD, which led to the reconstruction of the republican Basilica as an odeon under the supervision of Lucius Titinius Glaucus Lucretianus, who also worked on the Capitoline temple. From this time the Cosa territory became part of the imperial possessions of the Domitii Ahenobarbi, the family of the Emperor Nero.

However, as early as 80, Cosa seems to have been almost deserted. It was revived under the emperor Caracalla, during whose reign the portico around the forum was built, concealing two large granaries. At the same time, the odeon was restored, a Mithraeum constructed in the basement of the Curia, and a sanctuary to Liber erected at the southeast end of the Forum.

It is possible that the intermittent nature of the town's occupation was due to the fact that, already in the early Empire, malaria was hyperendemic on the coast of Tuscany. By the 4th century only the sanctuary of Liber was periodically visited. One of the last textual references to Cosa comes from Rutilius Claudius Namatianus who remarks that by 417 the site of Cosa was deserted and was in ruins, and suggests that a plague of mice had driven the people away.

=== Late Empire ===
In the early 6th century, some occupation in the ruins is attested by pottery, and the remains of a church have been found built onto the Basilica. Perhaps at the same time, the Arx was occupied by a fortified farm, subsequently transformed into a small fortified outpost under Byzantine control. This was abandoned in the late 6th or early 7th century.

=== Archaeology ===
In the 20th century, Cosa was the site of excavations conducted under the auspices of the American Academy in Rome, initially directed by the archaeologist Frank Edward Brown. Excavations (1948–54, 1965–72) traced the city plan, the principal buildings, the port, and uncovered the Arx, the forum, and many houses. No trace of a theatre or an amphitheatre has been found. In the 1990s a series of excavations was carried out under the direction of Elizabeth Fentress, then associated with the American Academy in Rome. This latter campaign aimed at understanding the history of the site between the imperial period and the Middle Ages. Sample excavations took place over the whole site, with larger excavations on the Arx, the Eastern Height, and around the Forum. From 2005 to 2012, the Universities of Granada and Barcelona excavated a domus, while from 2013,Florida State University excavated the baths in the southwest corner of the Forum. From 2016, l’Università di Firenze excavated along the processional street P.

== The City ==
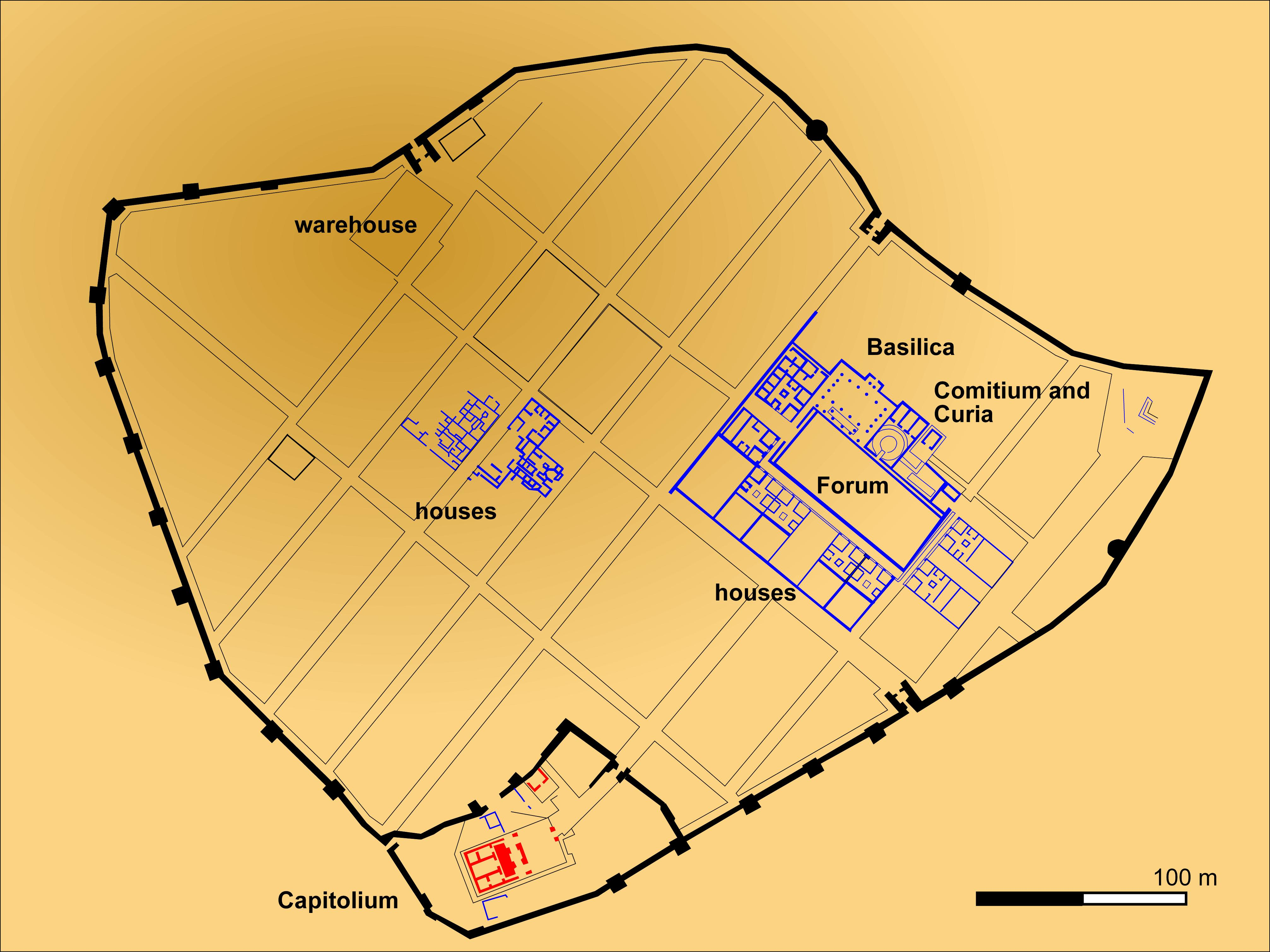
Map of cosa

=== Urban layout ===
Within the city walls the urban area was divided into an orthogonal plan with space allotted for civic, sacred and private buildings. The plan represents a subtle adaptation of an orthogonal plan to the complicated topography of the hill with buildings on terraces supported by dry stone walls. The streets were of three kinds: main streets 6 m wide, processional ones 8 m and secondary streets 4.5 m.

The forum was on a "saddle" between two heights and was linked to the Arx, the sacred area, by a processional street. Recent excavations have suggested that the original layout provided for about 248 houses, of which 20 were intended for the decurions, and were double the size of the houses of the ordinary citizens. The larger houses were found on the forum and the main processional streets.

=== City walls and gates ===
Cyclopean city wall

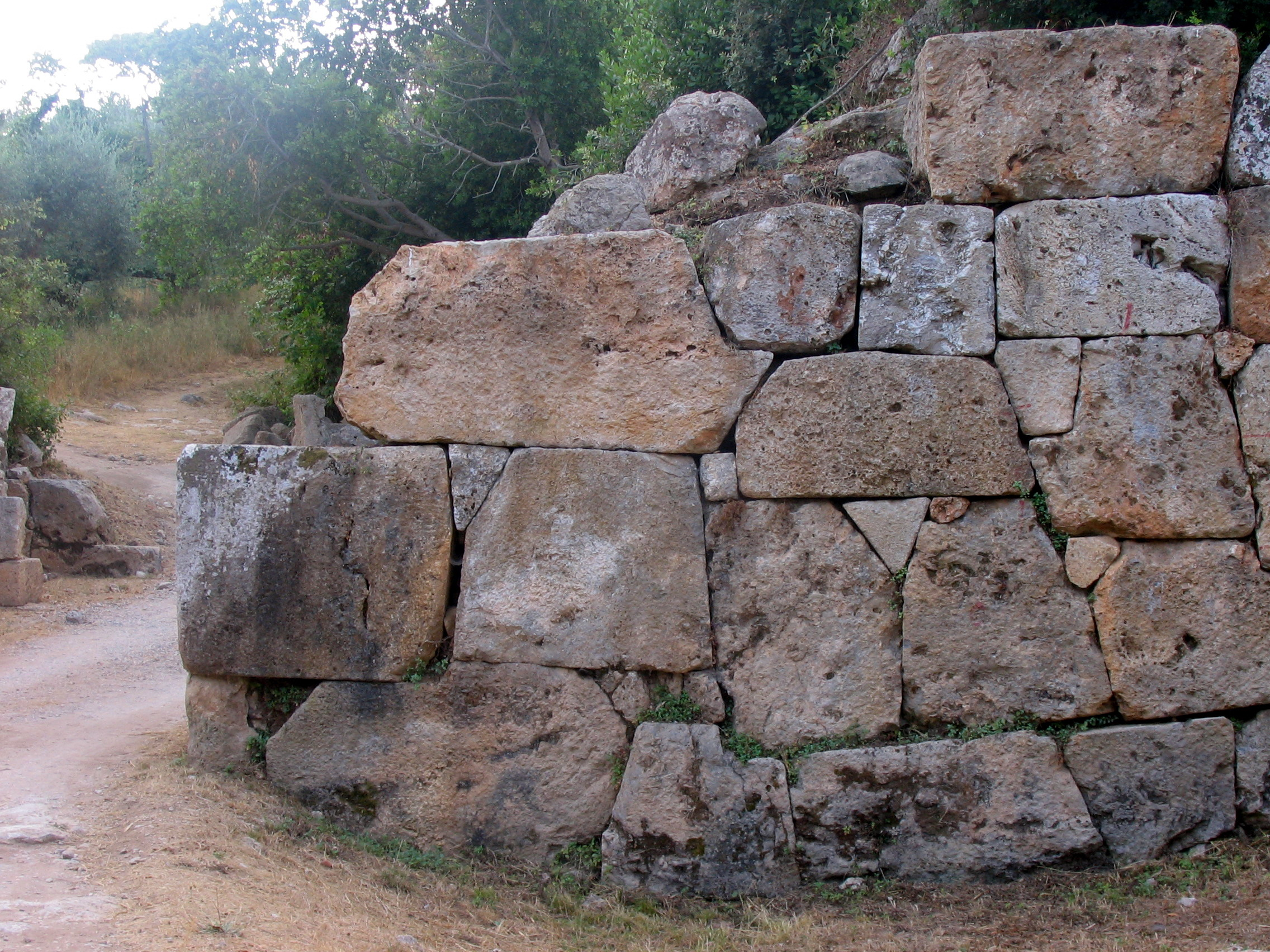
Detail of polygonal circuit wall

The massive city wall was built shortly after the foundation of the colony in 273 BC and much of it still survives in a remarkable state of preservation. It is 1.5 km (0.93 miles) long and built in polygonal masonry. It included a system of interval towers, numbering eighteen in all. These are found at irregular intervals, and all but one are rectangular in plan - the exception is round. There are three gates which correspond to as many roads: the northwest, or Florentine gate, which corresponds to the modern entrance to the site, the northeast, or Roman gate, and the southeast, or maritime gate. Each has the same structure, twin gates, one in line with the walls and one to the inside, with a space between them. The arx also had an independent circuit wall. At the western corner of this was a postern, closed in the early Byzantine period, when the hill was refortified with a wall built in opus emplectum. A final, medieval circuit in mortared rubble masonry runs along the same line.

In recent years, the Archaeological Soprintendenza of Tuscany has conducted extensive documentation, repairs, and reconstructions of the walls.

=== Temples on the Arx ===
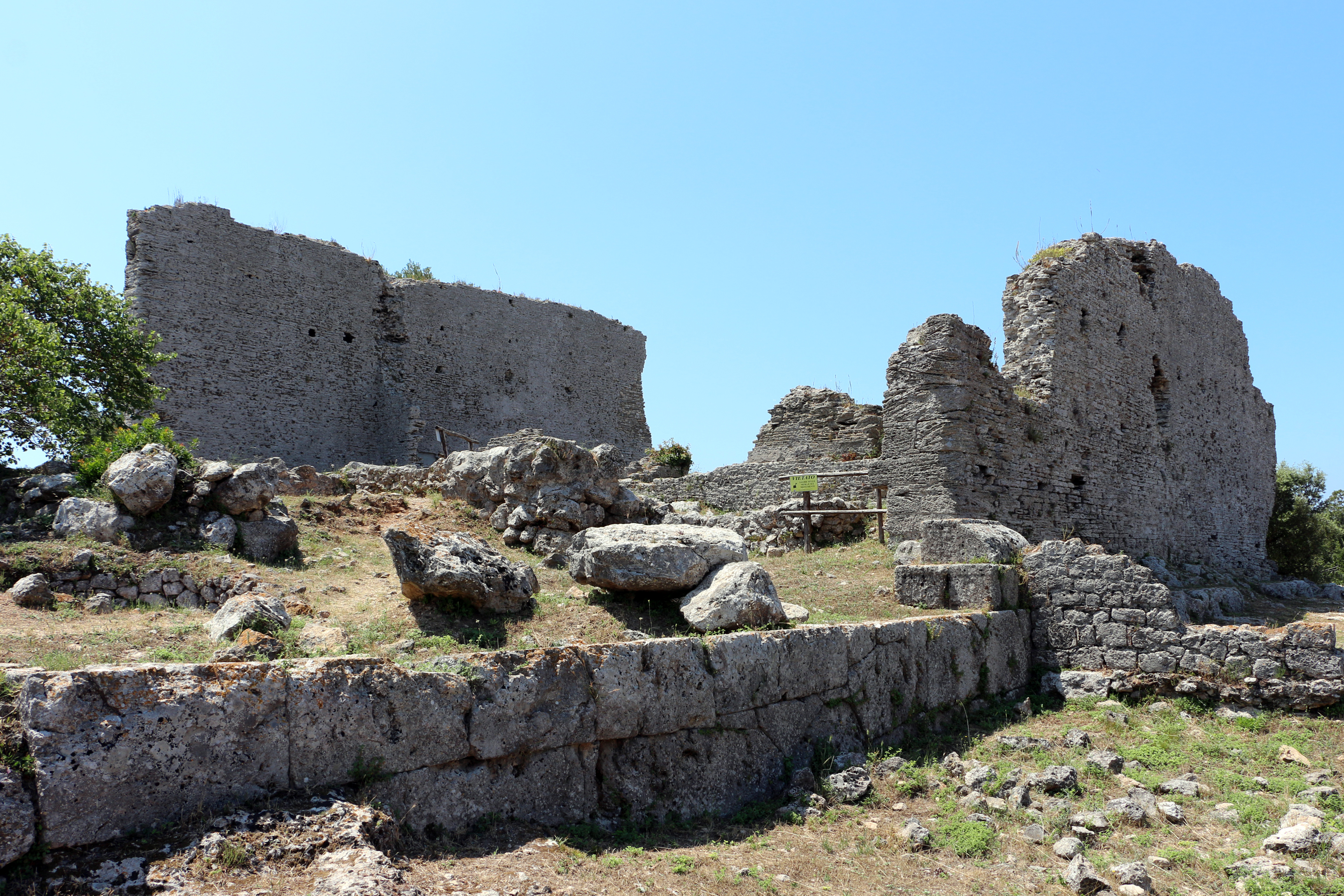
Arx

The Arx is on the highest and southernmost point of the colony, chosen from the first as the centre of religious life with the majority of temples. It had its own highly distinctive wall circuit with the same polygonal masonry as the city walls which it shared. The Arx was reachable only via the so-called "Processional Street" whose remains are still visible.

Aside from the colony's walls, the Arx has the most impressive remains. Though mainly a religious centre, there is some evidence of Republican housing. The oldest religious use of the Arx was a square platform and a natural crevice filled with ritual offerings. The first building on the Arx was the so-called "Temple of Jupiter" between the platform and the Arx wall. It was destroyed by fire at the beginning of the 1st century BC but parts of its decoration were employed in the "Capitolium".

The second temple was the "Temple of Mater Matuta" dated to 170-160 BC, while the Arx reached its fullest development in the early 2nd century BC, consisting of at least three temples and the monumental "Capitolium", the last temple to be built in 150 BC.

A great deal of terracotta fragments found on the Arx include temple decoration, pedimental structures and revetment plaques dating mostly from the late 3rd to the early 1st century BC. They display similar qualities to finds from Latin and Etruscan sites in Hellenistic Italy and reflect the influence of the larger Hellenistic Mediterranean world that Rome was beginning to dominate.

The temples were abandoned over time and the Arx lost its religious meaning. In the 6th century AD a granary, a stable and a barn were built there.

==== Temple "of Jupiter" ====
The so-called temple of Jupiter was on the crest of the Arx by the south wall of the Capitolium but was destroyed by fire in the middle of the 1st century BC and not rebuilt. Fragments of its terracotta decoration include two types of antefix featuring Minerva and Hercules which led to attribution to Jupiter as Minerva and Hercules were offsprings of the god.

==== Capitolium ====
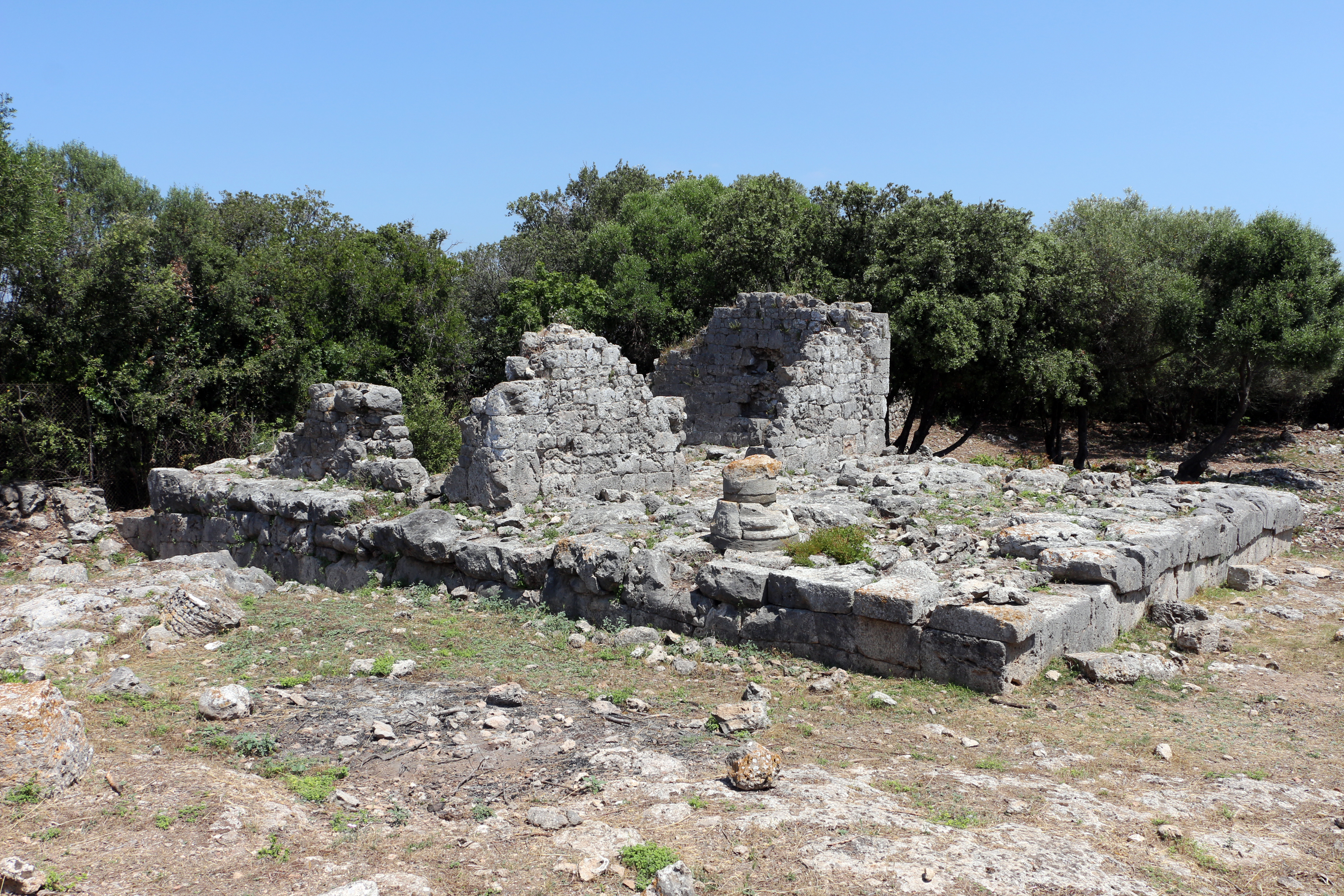
Capitolium

The Capitolium is the only one known in a Latin colony. It was located at the summit of the Arx and would have been visible for miles at sea. Smaller temples were to its left and right. The Capitolium was built in about 150 BC, most likely as an affirmation of Roman loyalty and identity following the Second Punic War.

A square platform underneath the Capitolium was cut into the rock but oriented differently from the later building. The Capitolium was oriented ENE and consisted of three cellae with a deep columnar pronaos (with the length of the space equally divided between the cellae and the pronaos). It was preceded by a terraced forecourt from which continuous steps arose across the entire facade. The temple walls rose from a high podium, its steps on the axis of the Via Sacra. It is believed that the Capitolium was modelled after the 6th-century BC Temple of Jupiter, Juno, and Minerva at Rome. Its terracotta mouldings are similar to the building traditions of Etruscan and early Roman architecture.

==== Temple A ====
Temple A consisted of a terraced podium and was oriented southwest. It was roughly the same size as the Capitolium with its forecourt, measuring 43 x 28 m. The polygonal masonry of its podium is closely related to that of the town walls.

==== Temple D (of Mater Matuta) ====
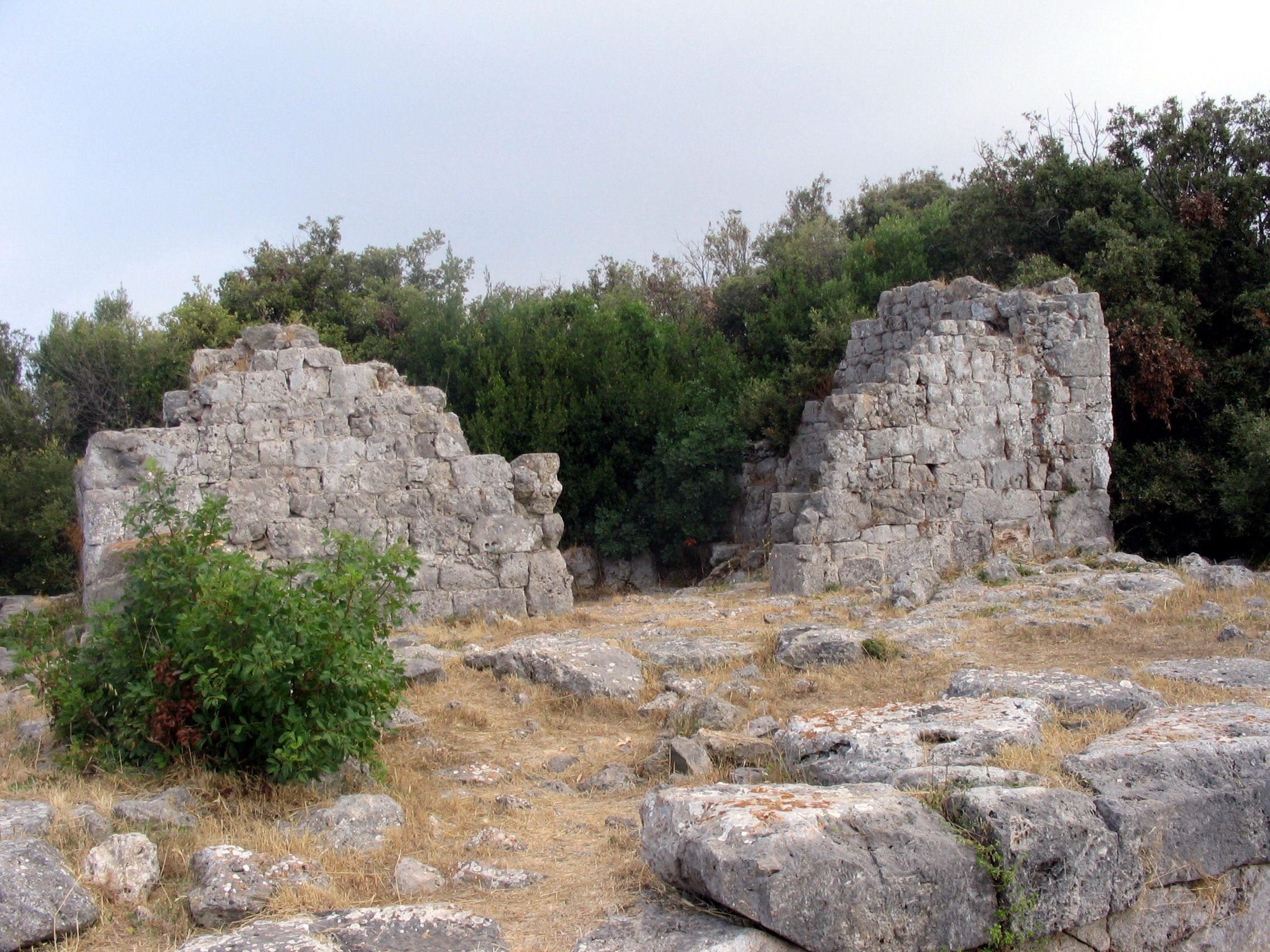
Temple of Mater Matuta

Dating to the late 3rd century BC, Temple D was located opposite the north angle of the Capitolium's forecourt and was oriented SE. It supported a single square cella. Temple D has been provisionally identified as being dedicated to the Roman-Italic goddess Mater Matuta.

=== Forum ===
Forum

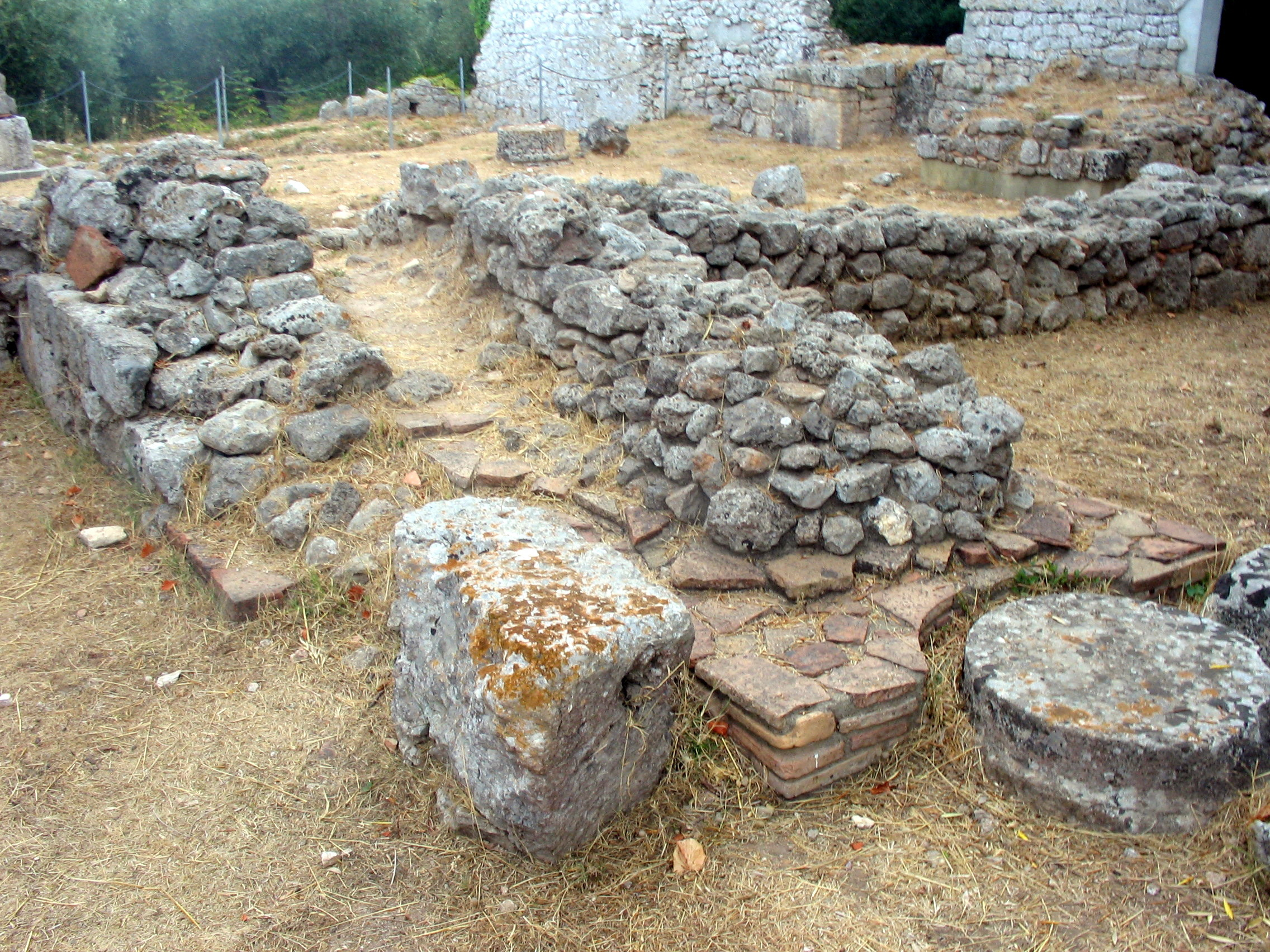
Basilica in the forum

The forum, as the public square of the city, occupied one-tenth of the urban area and was the site of many important buildings, including a basilica, a curia-comitium complex, Temple B, and one of Italy's oldest monumental arches tait the entrance to the forum.

The first buildings in the Forum were four large cisterns holding approximately 1.75 million litres of water.

=== Curia and Comitium ===
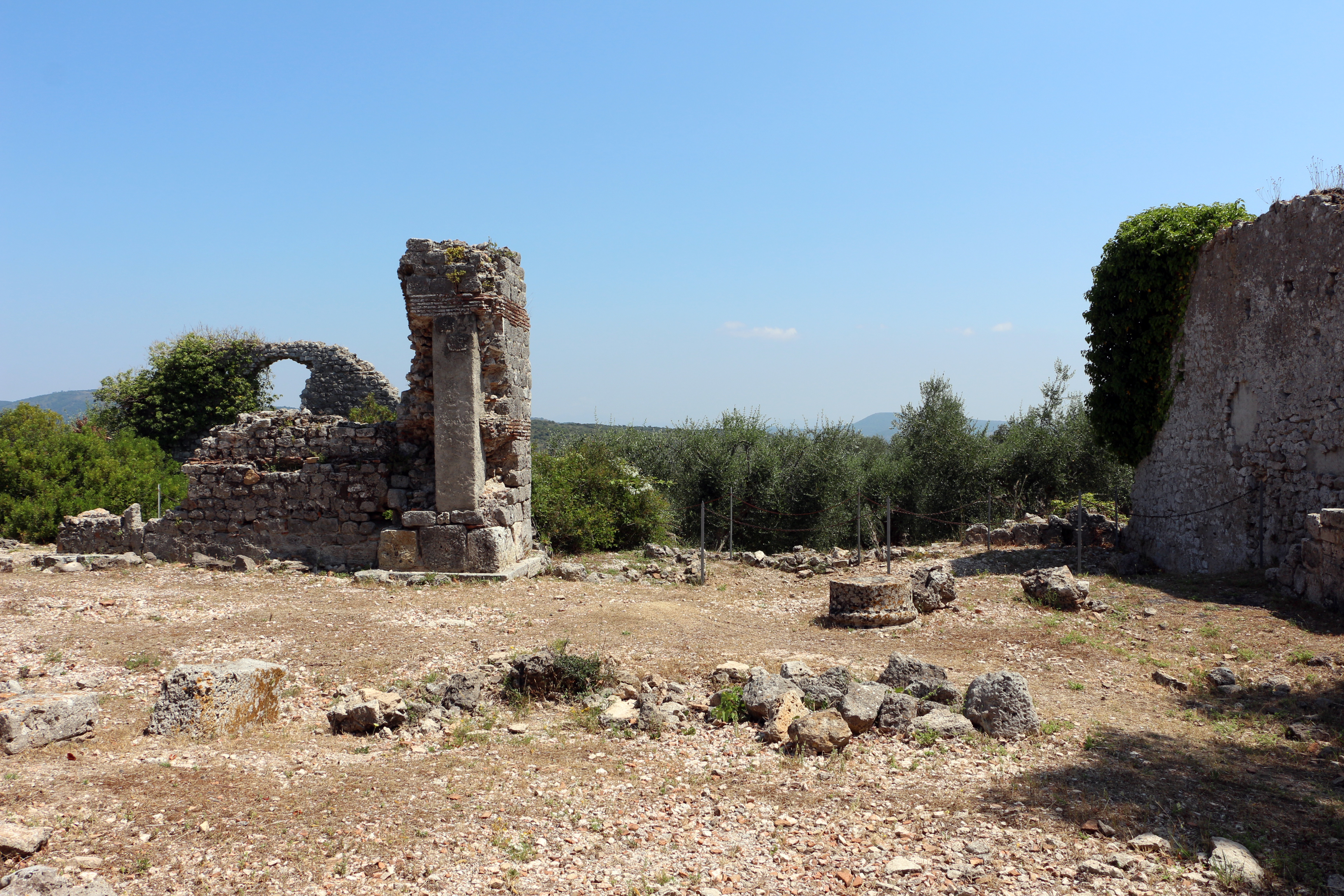
Comitium

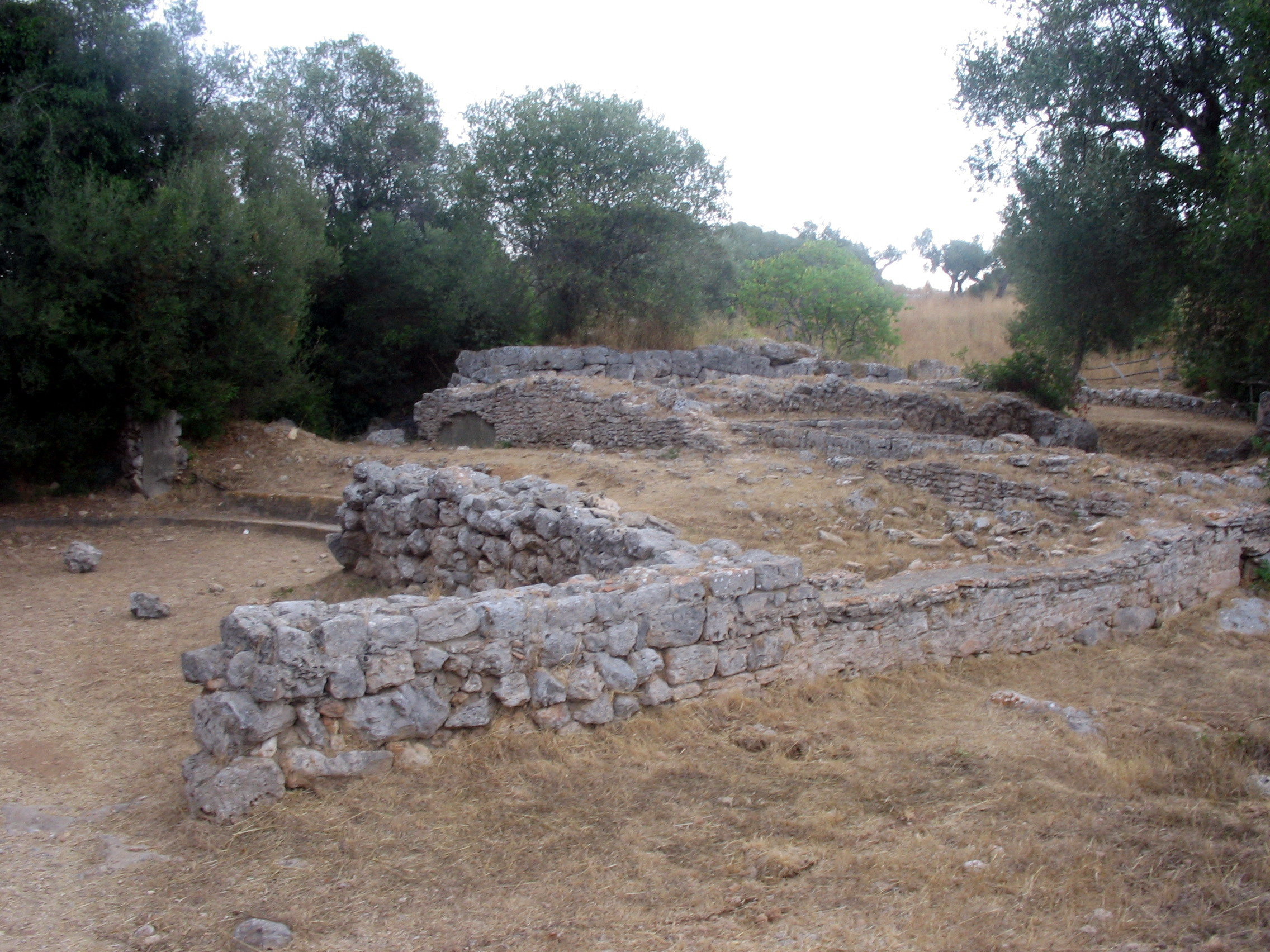
Remains of the Temple of Concord and the Comitium

These are two of the most important buildings: the Comitium shows many similarities to that of Rome; the Curia lies on the northern end of the Comitium and dates to the start of Cosa around 273 BC. The Curia was located between the basilica and Temple B.

The Curia was used for assemblies of the magistrates, while the Comitium was most likely used for public events, assemblies, funerals, and speeches. The Comitium steps would most likely have been stood on to allow for more people to assemble, and also because the size and shape (about 33 cm x 40 cm wide) would not have allowed for comfortable seating. Approximately 600 people could stand on the Comitium steps.

The original Curia shows many similarities to the Curia Hostilia at Rome. It is thought to have been a wooden structure with a stone base that was later made more permanent. The Comitium steps which lead up to the Curia appear to have been stone from the beginning. The earliest Curia started as a small two-story building consisting of the curia proper and possibly a records office. The biggest change is seen around 173 BC with the second wave of colonists which called for a larger Curia. The Curia was then expanded into a larger building with three halls. Scholars speculate that these three halls are at the northern end of a tabularium, with offices for aediles and other magistrates on the south side, and the Curia in the middle. This tripartite aspect is seen as a common in Roman culture such as in the Curia Julia and around the 4th/3rd century BC with the south halls of the Forum at Pompeii.

Curia II only lasted for fifteen to twenty years before more space was required and it was demolished to build Curia III.

After the rebuilding of Curia III and Temple B, the Basilica was laid out.

=== Temples B (temple of Concordia) and C ===
Temples B and C stood side by side to the southeast of the basilica. Little of Temple C, the smaller of the two, is visible. Temple B is dated from 175-150 BC and consisted of a single cella on a polygonal masonry base with two rows of two columns across its front (pronaos) and at least one stone-vaulted cistern. It is thought that it was built over earlier ruins due to the distinctive off-centre altar in front. The temple's elaborate terracotta decorations including pediment sculptures have been partially recovered as well as a frieze with chariots and horses, which remained in place for a long time, replaced only by copies from the original moulds.

After about thirty or forty years temple B was seriously damaged by the collapse of a wall which led to its reconstruction while preserving much of the older structure. Between the 10th and 11th centuries AD, a Christian church was built over the ruins.

=== The Eastern Height ===
==== Temple E ====
This small building is constructed at the summit of the Eastern Height, on an artificially flattened terrace facing the sea. The subsequent use of this site for a number of early medieval buildings has left little legible, but there remains enough to know that the podium, built of large ashlars like those of Temple D70 BCE, measured 6.25 x 11.25m. A date in the Republican period, perhaps in the middle of the second century BCE, has been proposed on the basis of a fragment of a Greco-Italic amphora of that date found inside the podium. This aligns with the comparison of its architectural terracottas with those of the original decoration of the Capitolium and those of Temple B. The temple may only have survived until 70 BCE, as the Augustan reconstruction does not seem to have reached that part of the original town.

=== Private houses ===
The site has played an important role in the interpretation of Roman colonisation during the Middle Republican period, notably in terms of the development of houses.

==== House of Diana ====
House of Diana

On the south side of the forum this large house, 16m wide and built around 170 BC has a standard atrium plan, very similar to that of the House of Sallust in Pompeii. Opening onto the forum are two shops (tabernae), with rear rooms and cesspits, probably intended for the sale of wine in one case and food in the other. The atrium with a central impluvium was entered through fauces. On the right and left were two cubicula, followed by two alae, or side rooms. At the back were the kitchen, the tablinum (reception room) and the triclinium, or dining room. Beyond them lay a garden, probably used for raising vegetables, as a large compost heap suggests. The house was destroyed around 70 BC and entirely rebuilt in the Augustan period, with a fine series of frescoes and mosaic floors. The triclinium was opened towards the rear and connected to the garden, now ornamental, through a colonnaded loggia for summer use. For a winter triclinium the two eastern cubicula were merged into a single room.

In the 50s AD it seems to have become the house of Lucius Titinius Glaucus Lucretianus who was responsible for the repair of the damage caused by an earthquake. In the garden he added a small sanctuary in the form of a temple to the goddess Diana including a fourth-century BC head of a woman in Greek marble.

The house was abandoned no later than the end of the first century AD and in the third century it was used for a granary.

==== House of the Skeleton ====
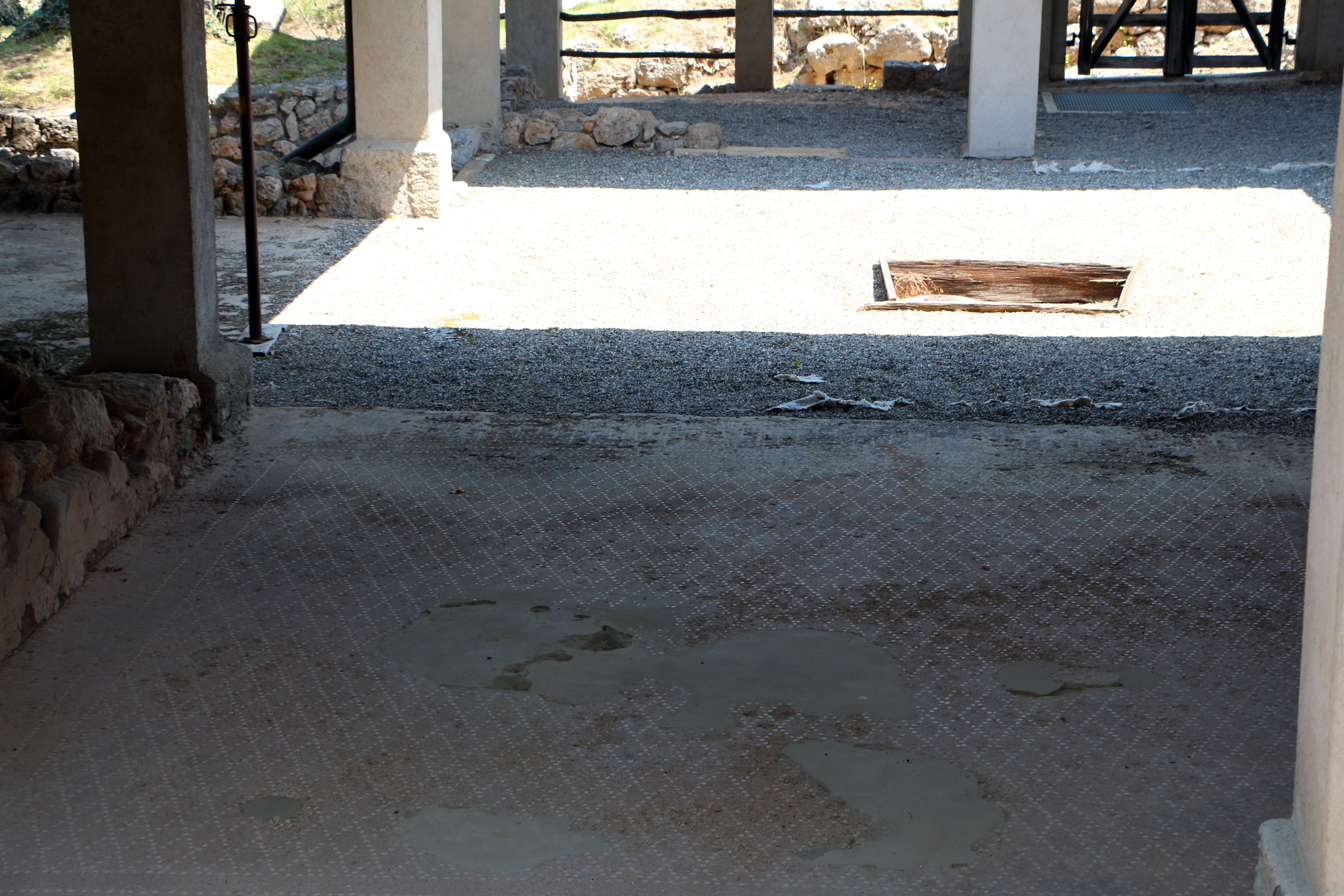
Atrium

The House of the Skeleton was named after the skeleton of an adult male found in the accumulation layers of the cistern, perhaps thrown there after the destruction of the city around 70 BC.

Built at the beginning of the 1st century BC, dated by Republican coins of 90-89 BC, on a terrace that is still visible, the house had originally a square plan (17.5 m on each side), later modified by the addition of a three-columned portico, the garden and other rooms connected to it. The heart of the house was the atrium, an unroofed courtyard with impluvium at its centre, a basin to collect rain water for an underground cistern.

The house included a kitchen and bathroom area; there is also a probable second kitchen and a pantry for food; nearby is a room which, based on the discovery of loom weights, was probably used for women's work. To the side of the entrance was a small bedroom. There was also a service area, perhaps an animal shelter, and stairs leading to an upper floor. There were also two exedrae, one for the winter months (hiberna), the other for the summer (aestiva). From the exedra aestiva one reached the covered triclinium and the portico, which led to the large garden and the summer triclinium. Most of the rooms have opus signinum floors made up of tesserae that created several patterns, including geometrical ones. Part of the wall decoration also remains in the First Pompeian Style.

The House was destroyed around the year 70 BC, perhaps due to a pirate incursion that raided the city, and was left abandoned. During the Augustan age the ruins of the House became a shelter for animals, testifying to an early ruralisation of this area of the city.

==== House of the treasure ====
In the same insula as the House of the Skeleton, this house was overbuilt by a modern farmhouse, now the Archaeological Museum. It owes its name to the discovery of a hoard of 2004 coins hidden under the pantry floor, perhaps to protect them from looting. A small group of these coins dates to the end of the 2nd century BC, while the majority date to 74-72 BC and their excellent preservation indicates that their burial dates to 72-71 BC and the house's destruction in 70 BC. Based on the treasure and similarities with the House of the Skeleton, the construction dates to 90-80 BC, but was built on the remains of earlier dwellings.

The discovery of two black-glazed vases with the letters Q. FVL. scratched on the bottom has allowed attribution of the house to a certain Quintus Fulvius. It featured three rooms (kitchen, pantry, and bathroom) and a large room, later divided into two. Fragments of First Style wall decoration were found; the floors were of red opus signinum decorated with white tesserae.

==== Houses of Square V-D ====
Excavations in 1993 dealt with a series of small houses in the western part of the site. These occupy street frontages of around 8 m, with open courtyard spaces and gardens in the rear. The smaller houses strongly resembled the Pompeii-style houses of the time, measuring about 8 m wide, containing a tablinum-type room and a minimum of one cubiculum, and were grouped around a courtyard. These smaller houses are typical of Roman housing of the Republican period, bearing a close resemblance to similar structures at Pompeii. The private houses surrounding the forum contrast the findings of Scott and what was previously thought about the houses at Cosa because they were much bigger and match the archetypal layout we see at sites like Pompeii. The houses elsewhere in the colony that have been excavated are only half as wide as the large houses surrounding the forum. There are a few possibilities as to what the larger houses meant in the grand scheme of the colony. Archaeologist Vincent Bruno suggests that the unusual layout of the house of the skeleton, a larger, 'atrium' house, suggests that this "quality of the unexpected may perhaps be regarded as a symptom of the period in which Roman builders were still experimenting with structural ideas later employed in more rigidly symmetrical compositions". Elizabeth Fentress suggests that the differentiation in house size between the smaller plots in this block and those clustered around the forum is due to a colonist class distinction. The houses near the forum and along the processional streets are almost certainly...houses for two classes of colonists, some of whom received plots twice as large as the others. The smaller houses are those of the ordinary colonists, with clear parallels at Pompeii and elsewhere. Regardless of the reasoning behind the different sizes and layouts of the private spaces, the houses at Cosa are extremely telling of the history of Cosa after 200 BC. Scott's excavations of the West Block show "not only the effects of the sack and subsequent abandonment of the town in the first century BC but also those of more recent and seasonal occupation by small farmers and herdsmen between the beginning of the 18th and 19th century."

=== Ancient port and fishery ===
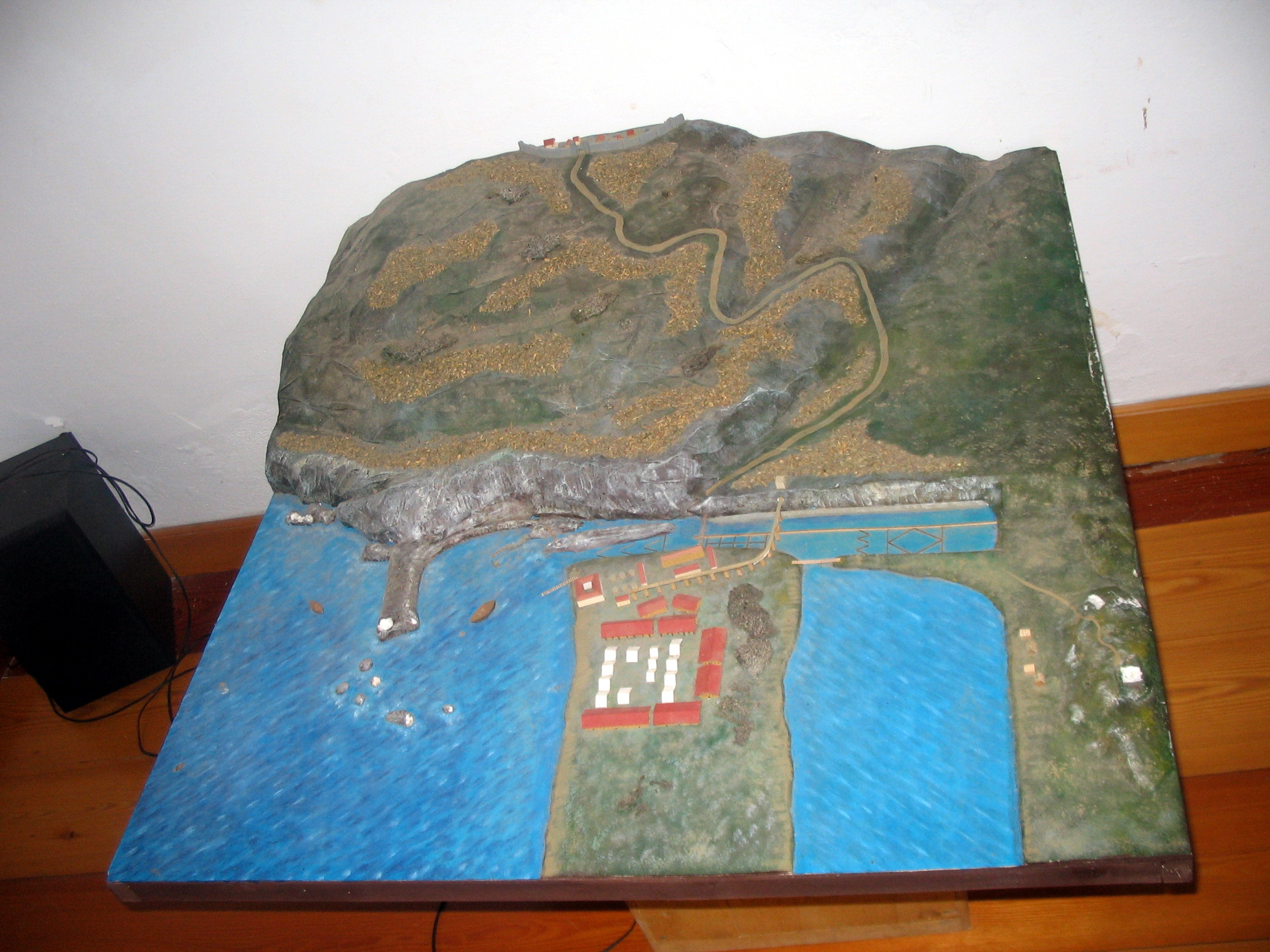
Model of the Portus Cosanus

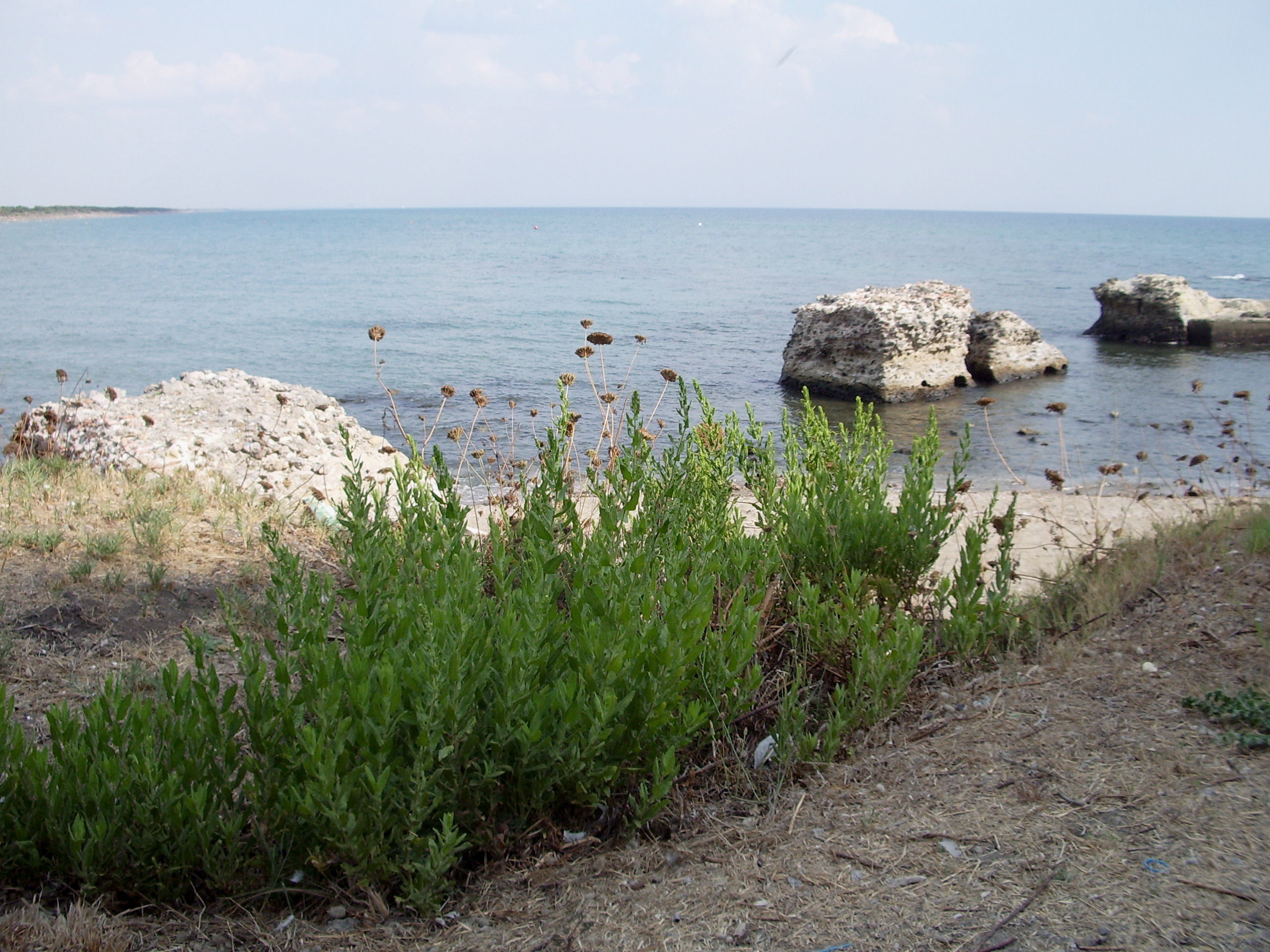
Port Cosanus

Cosa had two port areas, Portus Cosanus and Portus Feniliae. The former was located southeast of the city and founded at the same time as the Roman colony in 273 BC, the earliest Roman harbour known. Portus Feniliae was to the north of Cosa. Both had fish farms nearby dating from the Republican era.

Cosa provided the best anchorage between Gaeta in the south and La Spezia to the north, and was in a key position within newly acquired Etruscan territory.

It was also close to the sources of timber and supplies from the Tuscan hinterland which Rome was later to need for the creation of fleets in her first naval struggles with Carthage.

The port's main period of prosperity occurred from the late 2nd to the later 1st century BC, with a revival by the 2nd and 3rd centuries AD due to the growth of the villa economy in the nearby countryside. In 417 Rutilius Namatianus found the Cosa ports were no longer accessible during his voyage.

==== Portus Cosanus ====
Tagliata Etrusca

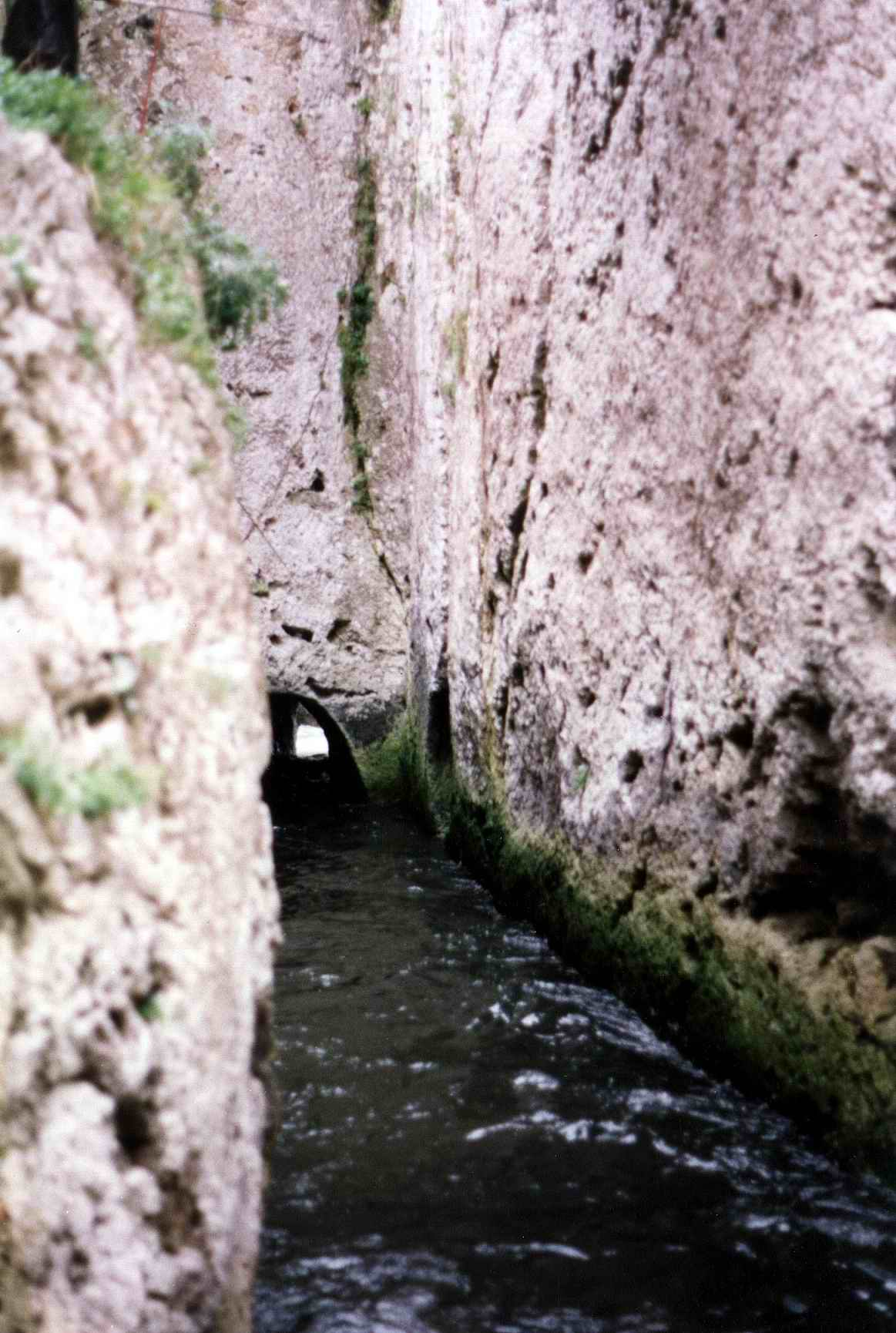
Tagliata Etrusca

It was a landlocked port and communicated with the sea by an artificial ship-channel, protected at the seaward end by a massive breakwater. A set of elaborate channels cut into the limestone cliff were designed to keep the mouth of the port free of sand and can still be seen, known as the Tagliata Etrusca (Etruscan cut).

There are visible remains of five piers in the Portus Cosanus harbour built from opus caementicium, mortared rubblework of tuff and sherds. The sherds are mostly from amphorae of Dressel Type I, suggesting a construction date during the 2nd or 1st centuries BC. The piers provide the earliest evidence for the use of tuff and pozzolana concrete in salt water because of its resistance to deterioration. There is also a continuous foundation of stone (only visible underwater) for a breakwater which offered protection on the southern exposure, as well as a series of discontinuous extensions of the breakwater protecting the harbour from the south and southwest winds.

A lucrative wine trade based in the Cosa area is shown by the many fragments of transport amphorae found on the beach and offshore areas of the harbour, many of which were stamped with the sign of the Sestius family, major exporters of wine whose trade network extended into Gaul, and Roman nobility who, according to Cicero, owned a villa in Cosa. The earliest of these sherds date to 175-150 BC and they continue into the 1st century. Their abundance of suggests that the port was their centre of manufacture and distribution, which firmly places Cosa as a key trading centre during the late Republic.

Eventually Portus Cosanus established its own community, including a temple dedicated either to Portunus or Neptune, which resembled the temple on the Arx and probably also dates to 170-160 BC, and an aqueduct whose pillars can be seen. An elaborate spring house was excavated at the west end of the lagoon in which one of the most important finds from the port was the unique wooden bucket chain mechanism from the second and first centuries BC, the earliest example known, that lifted water to the aqueduct. A new water wheel replaced it to lift water to a cistern when the spring house was refurbished to serve the baths of the maritime villa della Tagliata during the 1st century AD.

Completed in the mid-2nd century as part of an imperial project, the villa combined residential functions with a port and production facility in a rectangular plan with a monumental entrance, a tower and a bath complex. The villa was renovated in the 3rd century and survived until the mid-5th century. The villa is almost entirely unexplored and lies beneath a 14th-century watchtower.

==== Fishery ====
The coastal barrier lagoon now silted up was originally 20 km long, up to 800 m wide, and 5 m deep and within this two 90m long concrete fish ponds covering 1.2 ha were built and linked to the sea by channels some cut into the limestone hill that exist today. This earliest known commercial fishery was about 250 m to the north of Portus Cosanus and completed with a freshwater spring enclosed in a spring house (on the western embankment). The connecting channels allowed for continuous circulation of water and fish as well as salinity and temperature control. The evidence points to a large-scale fishing industry at Cosa, and there may have been a factory close by for salting fish and producing garum (the fish sauce), trade in which is thought to have been much more lucrative than for most wines.

==== Archaeological methods ====
Lewis invented two new technical devices: a water jet prober to help identify structures buried in the sand, and a construction of sheet steel formed by joining cylinders which could be used to obtain harbour stratification. This allowed finds to be recovered in a stratified context for the first time in underwater archaeology, and established ancient harbour levels for Cosa 1-1.8 m below the current sea floor.

== Middle Ages ==
Cosa appears in some documents dating from the 11th century, although a 9th-century occupation is suggested by frescoes at the abbey of S. Anastasio alle Tre Fontane in Rome, recording the capture of the site by Charlemagne and Pope Leo III. However, no sign of occupation between the eighth and the tenth centuries has been recovered. By the end of the 10th century, a small cemetery was found next to a church built over a temple facing the forum. The town is recorded as Ansedoniam civitatem in a privilege of Pope Gregory VII (1073-1085).

Occupation of the site began with a few sunken-floored buildings, but by the 11th century, it was concentrated on the Eastern Height, now surrounded by a double bank and ditch. In the 12th century, a tower was built in the centre of these fortifications, with a large cistern on two sides. That this cistern was subsequently used as a prison is suggested by graffiti on its plaster lining, one of which gives the date of 1211.

The castle, belonging to the Aldobrandeschi family in 1269, was destroyed by the Sienese army in 1329, on the pretext that it was occupied by bandits. A catapult or trebuchet base found on the Eastern Height may have formed part of the defences at this time. The site remained deserted after this time.

== See also ==
- For the "Port of Cosa", Amphora Industry, see Fish sauce, and garum.
- See Pozzolana mortar, for the marine concrete in the Port of Cosa.

== Bibliography ==
FINAL PUBLICATIONS

1. Brown, F. E., Richardson E. H. and Richardson, L. jr. "Cosa I, History and Topography." MAAR 20, 1951, 5-113. JSTOR; DOI: 10.2307/4238626
2. Brown, F.E. Cosa II, the Temples of the Arx. MAAR 26, 1960. JSTOR; DOI: 10.2307/4238649
3. Dyson, Stephen L. Cosa: The Utilitarian Pottery MAAR 33, 1976. Full text at HathiTrust.
4. Brown, F. E. Cosa, the Making of a Roman Town Ann Arbor: University of Michigan Press, 1980. WorldCat
5. Brown, F.E., Richardson E. H. and Richardson, L. jr. Cosa III: the buildings of the forum: colony, municipium, and village. MAAR 37, Rome 1993. WorldCat
6. Bruno, V. J. and Scott., R. T. Cosa IV, The Houses. MAAR 38, Rome 1993.
7. Collins Clinton, J. A Late Antique Shrine of Liber Pater at Cosa, (Etudes préliminaires aux religions orientales dans l'empire romain, vol. 64), Leiden, 1977.
8. McCann, A. M., J. Bourgeois, E.K. Gazda, J.P. Oleson, and E.L. Will. The Roman Port and Fishery of Cosa: a Center of Ancient Trade, Princeton: Princeton University Press, 1987. JSTOR
9. Fentress, E. et al. Cosa V: An Intermittent Town, Excavations 1991-1997 MAAR supp. Ann Arbor: University of Michigan Press, 2004. JSTOR; DOI: 10.2307/4238459

MATERIALS

1. Brendel, O. "A Ganymede Group from Cosa," American Journal of Archaeology Vol. 73, No. 2 (Apr., 1969), 232. JSTOR
2. Bruno, Vincent J. "Fragments of a Temple Decoration from the Arx at Cosa," American Journal of Archaeology Vol. 73, No. 2 (Apr., 1969), p. 232 JSTOR
3. Buttrey, T.V. "Cosa: The Coins" MAAR 34, 1980, 11-153. JSTOR; DOI: 10.2307/4238673
4. Fitch, C.R. and Goldman, N., The Lamps, (Memoirs of the American Academy in Rome; 39). University Park: American Academy in Rome, 1993. ISBN 9780472105182.
5. Grose, David Frederick (R. T. Scott, editor). The Hellenistic, Roman, and Medieval Glass from Cosa. (Supplements to the Memoirs of the American Academy in Rome). Ann Arbor: University of Michigan Press, 2017. ISBN 978-0-472-13062-7.
6. Hobart, M.: 'Ceramica invetriata di Cosa (Ansedonia - Orbetello)' in L. Paroli, ed., La ceramica invetriata tardoantica e altomedievale in Italia, Florence, 1990, 304-309.
7. Hobart, M. 'La Maiolica arcaica di Cosa (Orbetello)' in Atti del XXIV convegno internazionale della ceramica, Albissola, 1991, 71-89.
8. Marabini Moevs, M. T. The Roman Thin Walled Pottery from Cosa (1948-1954), MAAR 32, 1973. Full text at HathiTrust.
9. Marabini Moevs, M. T. "Italo-Megarian Ware at Cosa," MAAR 34, 1980, 161-227. JSTOR; DOI: 10.2307/4238674
10. Marabini Moevs, M. T. Cosa. The Italian Sigillata. MAAR supp. 3. Ann Arbor: Published for the American Academy in Rome by the University of Michigan Press, 2006. WorldCat
11. Scott, A. R. Cosa: The Black-Glaze Pottery 2. MAAR supp. 5. Ann Arbor: Published for the American Academy in Rome by the University of Michigan Press, 2008. WorldCat
12. Scott, R. T. "A New Inscription of the Emperor Maximinus at Cosa" Chiron 11, 1981, 309-314. DOI
13. Scott, R. T. "A new fragment of "serpent ware" from Cosa," Journal of Glass Studies 34(1992) 158-159.
14. Taylor, D. M. "Cosa, Black-Glaze Pottery," MAAR 25, 1957, 65-193. JSTOR
15. Tondo, L. "Monete medievale da Ansedonia," ArchMed IV, 1977, 300-305. ProQuest
16. Tongue, W. "The Brick Stamps of Cosa," American Journal of Archaeology Vol. 54, No. 3 (Jul. - Sep., 1950), 263. JSTOR
17. Will, E. Lyding "Ambiguity in Horace, Odes 1.4," CP 77 (1982), 240-245.
18. Will, E. Lyding. "Defining the "Regna Vini" of the Sestii," in Goldman, N.W., ed. New Light from Ancient Cosa: Studies in honor of Cleo Rickman Fitch. New York, 2000, 35-47.
19. Will, E. Lyding "The Roman Amphoras," in McCann, A.M., J. Bourgeois, E.K. Gazda, J.P. Oleson, and E.L. Will, The Roman Port and Fishery of Cosa: A center of Ancient Trade, Princeton, 1987, 170-220.
20. Will, E. Lyding "The Sestius Amphoras. A Reappraisal," Journal of Field Archaeology 6, 1979, 339-350. JSTOR
21. Will, Elizabeth Lyding and Kathleen Warner Slane. 2019 Cosa: The Roman and Greek Amphoras. (Supplements to the Memoirs of the American Academy in Rome). Ann Arbor: University of Michigan Press. ISBN 978-0-472-13143-3.

EPIGRAPHY

1. Babcock, Charles L. "An inscription of Trajan Decius at Cosa," AJP 83.2, 1962, 147-158. JSTOR; DOI: 10.2307/292212
2. Manacorda, D. "Considerazioni sull'epigrafia della regione di Cosa," Athenaeum 57, 1979, 73-92
3. Saladino, V. "Iscrizioni del territorio di Cosa," Epigraphica 39, 1977, 142-151.
4. Scott, R. T. "A New Inscription of the Emperor Maximinus at Cosa," Chiron 11, 1981, 309-314. DOI

STUDIES

1. Brown, F. E., Zancani Montuoro, P. "Il faro di Cosa in ex-voto a Vulci?," RIA 2, 1979, 5-29.
2. Dyson, S., 2005: "Success and failures at Cosa (Roman and American)", Journal of Roman Archaeology 18, 615-620. DOI
3. Fentress, E., L. Richardson Jr., R. T. Scott: "Excavations at Cosa: the First Fifty Years"
4. Fentress, E., "Introduction: Cosa and the idea of the city" in Fentress, E., ed., Romanization and the City. Creation, Transformations and Failures, Journal of Roman Archaeology supp. 38, Portsmouth, RI, 2000.
5. Fentress, E. and E. Cirelli. "After the Rats: Cosa in the Late Empire and Early Middle Ages". In N. Christie and A. Augenti, eds., Urbes Extinctae: archaeologies of abandoned classical towns. Farnham: Ashgate, 2012.
6. Gerkan, A. von "Zur Datierung der Kolonie Cosa," in Scritti in Onore di Guido Libertini, Florence 1958, 149-156.
7. Hesberg, H. von. "Coloniae Maritimae," Römische Mitteilungen 92, 1985, 127-150.
8. Manacorda, D. "The Ager Cosanus and the production of the amphorae of Sestius: New evidence and a reassessment," Journal of Roman Studies 68, 1978, 122-131. JSTOR
9. Richardson Jr., L. "Cosa and Rome, Comitium and Curia," Archaeology 10, 1957, 49-55. JSTOR
10. Scott, R. T. "The decorations in terracotta from the temples of Cosa," In La coroplastica templare etrusca fra il IV e il II secolo a. C. Florence, 1992, 91-128.
11. Scott, R. T. "The Latin colony of Cosa," DialArch 6, 1988, 73-77.
12. Sewell, J., "Trading places? A reappraisal of the fora at Cosa," Ostraka 14, 2005, 91-114. Academia.edu
13. Taylor, Rabun. "Temples and Terracottas at Cosa," American Journal of Archaeology 106.1 (2002) 59-84. JSTOR
14. Dyson, Stephen L. "Success and failures at Cosa (Roman and American)." Journal of Roman Archaeology 18 (2005) 615-20.
15. Dyson, Stephen L. "Cosa." In A Companion to the Archaeology of the Roman Republic, edited by J. DeRose Evans, 472-484. Oxford: Blackwell Publishing Ltd, 2013. doi: 10.1002/9781118557129.ch30
16. De Giorgi, Andrea U., Russell T. Scott, Jr., Ann Glennie, and Allison Smith. "Cosa (Orbetello, GR): 70 years of excavations and new directions," BOLLETTINO DI ARCHEOLOGIA ON LINE X, 3-4 (2019) BollArch
17. De Giorgi, Andrea U. "The Foundation of Cosa: Context, Plans, and Resources," In The Routledge Handbook of the Archaeology of Urbanism in Italy in the Age of Roman Expansion (Routledge, 2024). Taylor and Francis
18. De Giorgi, Andrea U. “Cosa, Orbetello, and the Genesis of a Colony.” In Roman Urbanism in Italy: Recent Discoveries and New Directions, vol. 5, edited by Alessandro Launaro. Oxbow Books, 2024. DOI
19. Rönnberg, Maximilian. "Pirates in Cosa? Frank E. Brown’s Unmaking of a Roman Town." Memoirs of the American Academy in Rome, 2025, Vol. 70 (2025), pp. 107–137 JSTOR

INTERIM REPORTS

1. Brown, F. E. "Scavi a Cosa - Ansedonia 1965-6," BdA 52, 1967, 37-41
2. Brown, F.E. "Excavations at Cosa, 1965-1968," American Journal of Archaeology Vol. 73, No. 2 (Apr., 1969), p. 232 JSTOR
3. Scott, R. "The Arx of Cosa (1965-1970)," AJA 73, 1969, 245. Bryn Mawr College Repository
4. Brown, F. E. "The Northwest Gate of Cosa and its Environs," Studi di antichità in onore de G. Maetzke, Rome 1984, 493-498
5. Ciampoltrini, G. "Orbetello (Grosseto) Località Ansedonia. Ricerche sui monumenti d'età traianea e adreanea del suburbio orientale di Cosa," BA 11-12 1991
6. Ciampoltrini, G. "Orbetello (Grosseto) La necropoli di Cosa. Ricerche e recuperi 1985-1991," BA 7, 1991, 59-73.
7. Fentress, E., Hobart, M., Clay, T., Webb, M. "Late Roman and Medieval Cosa I: The Arx and the Structure near the Eastern Height," PBSR 59, 1991, 197-230. JSTOR
8. Fentress, E. "Cosa in the empire: the unmaking of a Roman town," Journal of Roman Archaeology 7, 1994, 208-222. DOI
9. Fentress, E., and Celuzza, M.G. "La Toscana centro-meridionale: i casi di Cosa - Ansedonia e Roselle." In R. Francovich and G.Noyé eds., La Storia dell'Alto Medioevo Florence 1994, 601-613
10. Fentress, E., and Rabinowitz, A. "Excavations at Cosa 1995: Atrium Building V and a new Republican Temple," MAAR 41, 1996. JSTOR
11. Hobart, M. "Cosa - Ansedonia (Orbetello) in età medievale: da una città romana ad un insediamento medievale sparso," ArchMed 22, 1995, 569-583.
12. Roca Roumens, M.,"Orbetello (GR) . Excavación en la insula O-P/4-5 de ciudad romana de Cosa," Notiziario della Soprintendenza per i Beni archeologici della Toscana 3, 2007, 480-485.

THE TERRITORY OF COSA AND THE LOWER ALBEGNA VALLEY IN THE ROMAN PERIOD

1. Attolini, I. et al. "Political geography and productive geography between the valleys of the Albegna and the Fiora in northern Etruria," In G. Barker and J. Lloyd, eds, Roman Landscapes, London, 142-153.
2. Bisconti, F. "Tarda antichità ed alto medioevo nel territorio orbetellano. Primo bilancio critico," Atti del VI congresso nazionale di archeologia cristiana, Florence 1986, 63-77.
3. Bronson, R., Uggieri, G. "Isola del Giglio, Isola di Giannutri, Monte Argentario, Laguna di Orbetello," SE 38, 1970, 201-230.
4. Calastri, C. "L’insediamento di Portus Fenilie nell’agro Cosano." Campagna e paesaggio nell’Italia antica, Rome, 2000, 127-136
5. Cambi, F., Fentress, E. "Villas to Castles: first millennium A.D. Demography in the Albegna Valley." In K. Randsborg, ed., The Birth of Europe, Rome, 1989, 74-86.
6. Carandini, A. "Il vigneto e la villa del fondo di Settefinestre nel Cosano. Un caso di produzione per il mercato trasmarino," MAAR 36, 1980, 1-10. JSTOR
7. Carandini, A. ed. La romanizzazione dell'Etruria: il territorio di Vulci (catalogue of the exhibition at Orbetello, 1985), Florence 1985
8. Carandini, A., Ricci, A. eds. Settefinestre: una villa schiavistica nell'Etruria romana, Modena 1985.
9. Carandini, A., Settis, S. eds. Schiavi e padroni nell'Etruria romana Bari 1979
10. Carandini, A., Cambi, F., Celuzza M.G. and Fentress, E., eds. Paesaggi d'Etruria: Valle dell'Albegna, Valle d'Oro, Valle del Chiarone, Valle del Tafone : progetto di ricerca italo-britannico seguito allo scavo di Settefinestre Roma : Edizioni di storia e letteratura, 2002.
11. Carlsen, J. "Considerations on Cosa and the Ager Cosanus," Analecta Romana Instituti Danici 13, 1984, 49-58. SDU
12. Castagnoli, F. "La centuriazione di Cosa," MAAR 25, 1957, 149-165. JSTOR
13. Celuzza, M.G., Regoli, E. "La Valle d'Oro nel territorio di Cosa. Ager Cosanus and Ager Veientanus a confronto," DdA 1, 31-62.
14. Ciampoltrini, G. "Un insediamento tardo-repubblicano ad Albinia," Rassegna di Archeologia 4 1984, 149-180.
15. Ciampoltrini, G. "Una statua ritratto di età imperiale dalla foce dell'Albegna," Prospettiva 43, 1985, 43-47.
16. Ciampoltrini, G., Rendini, P. "L'agro Cosano fra tarda antichità e alto medioevo. Segnalazione e contributi," ArchMed 15, 1988, 519-534.
17. Del Chiaro, M. "A new late republican-early imperial villa at Campo della Chiesa, Tuscany," Journal of Roman Archaeology 2, 1989, 111-117. DOI
18. Dyson, S. "Settlement Patterns in the Ager Cosanus. The Wesleyan University Survey," Journal of Field Archaeology 5, 1978, 251-263. JSTOR
19. Fentress, E. 1984. "Via Aurelia - Via Aemilia," PBSR 52, 1984, 72-77.
20. Fentress, E.- "Peopling the Countryside.: Roman Demography in the Albegna Valley and Jerba" in A. Bowman and A. Wilson, eds., Quantifying the Roman Economy. Methods and Problems. Oxford, 127-162.
21. Manacorda, D. "Produzione agricola, produzione ceramica e proprietari nell'ager Cosanus nel I sec. a. C." In Società romana e produzione schiavistica Bari 1981, 3-54.
22. Pasquinucci, M. 1982. "Contributo allo studio dell'ager cosanus: la villa dei muraci a Porto Santo Stefano," SCO 32, 1982, 141 -149
23. Quilici-Gigli, S., Quilici L. "Ville dell'agro cosano con fronte a torrette," RIA 1 1978, 11-64.
24. Quilici-Gigli, S. "Portus Cosanus. Da monumento archeologico a spiaggia di Ansedonia," BstorArt 36, 1993, 57-63.
25. Peacock, D.: 1977. "Recent Discoveries of Amphora Kilns in Italy," AntJ 57, 1977, 262ff.
26. Rathbone, D. "The development of agriculture in the Ager Cosanus during the Roman Republic. Problems of evidence and interpretation," JRS 71 1981, 10-23. JSTOR
27. Uggeri, G. "Il popolamento del territorio cosano nell'antichità." In Aspetti e problemi di storia dello Stato dei presidi in Maremma, Grosseto 1981, 37-53.
28. Vitali, D., Laubenheimer, F., "Albinia, Torre Saline (prov. Di Grosseto) Il complesso produttivo con fornaci, II-I secolo a.C.-I secolo d.C." MEFRA 116, 2004, 591-604. Persée
29. Vitali, D., Laubenheimer, F., Benquet, L. "La produzione e il commercio del vino nell’Etruria romana. Le fornaci di Albinia (Orbetello, GR.)" in Archeologia della vite e del vino in Etruria. Atti del Convegno internazionale di studi. Scansano, 9-10 settembre 2005, Siena 2007. 191-200.
30. Vitali, D., ed, 2007. Le fornaci e le anfore di Albinia: primi dati su produzioni e scambi dalla costa tirrenica al mondo gallico. Atti del seminario internazionale (Ravenna, 6-7 maggio 2006). Albinia, 1.
