= Peter von Blanckenhagen =

American archaeologist (1909–1990)

Peter Heinrich von Blanckenhagen (March 21, 1909, in Riga, Russia; now in Latvia – March 6, 1990, in New York, United States) was a scholar of Roman art, and especially ancient wall painting.

== Early life ==
Von Blanckenhagen and his family fled to Germany following the Bolshevik coup. It was in German universities that he received his training in Classical archaeology.

== Career ==
In 1947, von Blanckenhagen emigrated to the United States and was a visiting professor at the University of Chicago. He would return to Germany, but became an American citizen in 1956. As a scholar he was best known for his expertise in Roman painting and sculpture - particularly of the Flavian period - and he had a long and distinguished career during which he published numerous books and articles and held several eminent lectureships. He wrote multiple books about the art of the Villa of Agrippa Postumus in Boscotrecase. At his death, von Blanckenhagen was the Robert Lehman Professor Emeritus of Fine Arts at the Institute of Fine Arts at New York University.

== Honours ==
Von Blanckenhagen was awarded the Commander’s Cross of the Order of Merit of the Federal Republic of Germany in 1981. He was awarded the Gold Medal Award for Distinguished Archaeological Achievement from the Archaeological Institute of America in 1982. He was a member of both the American Academy of Arts and Sciences and the American Philosophical Society.

== Publications ==
- The Paintings from Boscotrecase. Heidelberg: F.H. Kerle, 1962.
- "Daedalus and Icarus on Pompeian Walls," Römische Mitteilungen 75 (1968): 106-145.
- The Augustan Villa at Boscotrecase. Mainz am Rhein: P. von Zabern, 1990.
- "Das Bild des Menschen in der Romischen Kunst". Krefeld, Germany: Scherpe-Verlag, 1948. (The Human Image in Roman Art)
