= Settefinestre =

Ancient Roman villa in Orbetello, Italy

Coordinates: 42°25′50.14″N 11°19′36.32″E

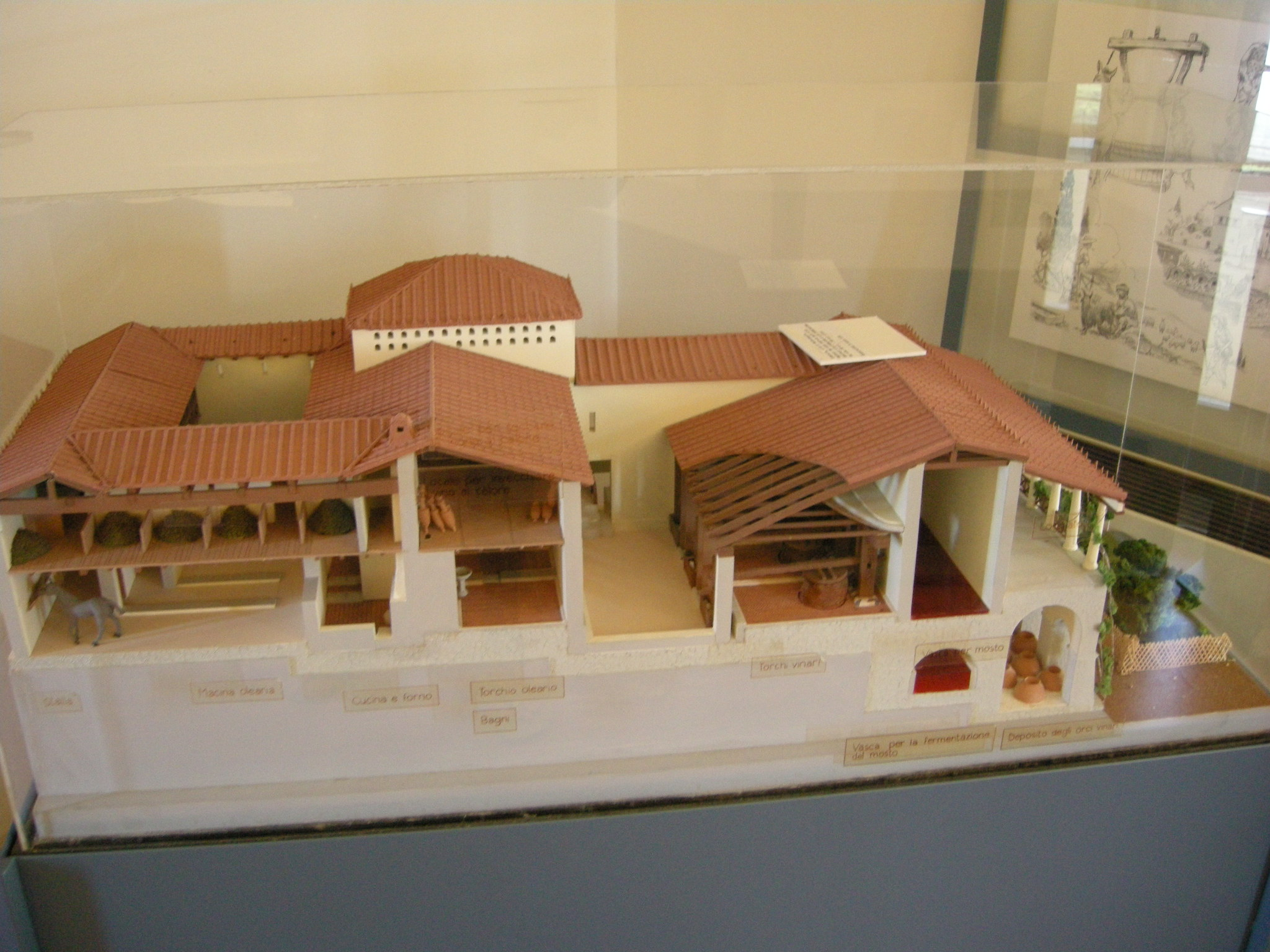
- Reconstruction of part of the villa (Museo archeologico di Rosignano Marittimo)

- Location within Tuscany
- Type: villa and estate
- Periods: Roman Republic Roman Empire
- Region: Tuscany

History
- Built: 1st century BC

Site notes
- Archaeologists: Andrea Carandini

Plan of early villa

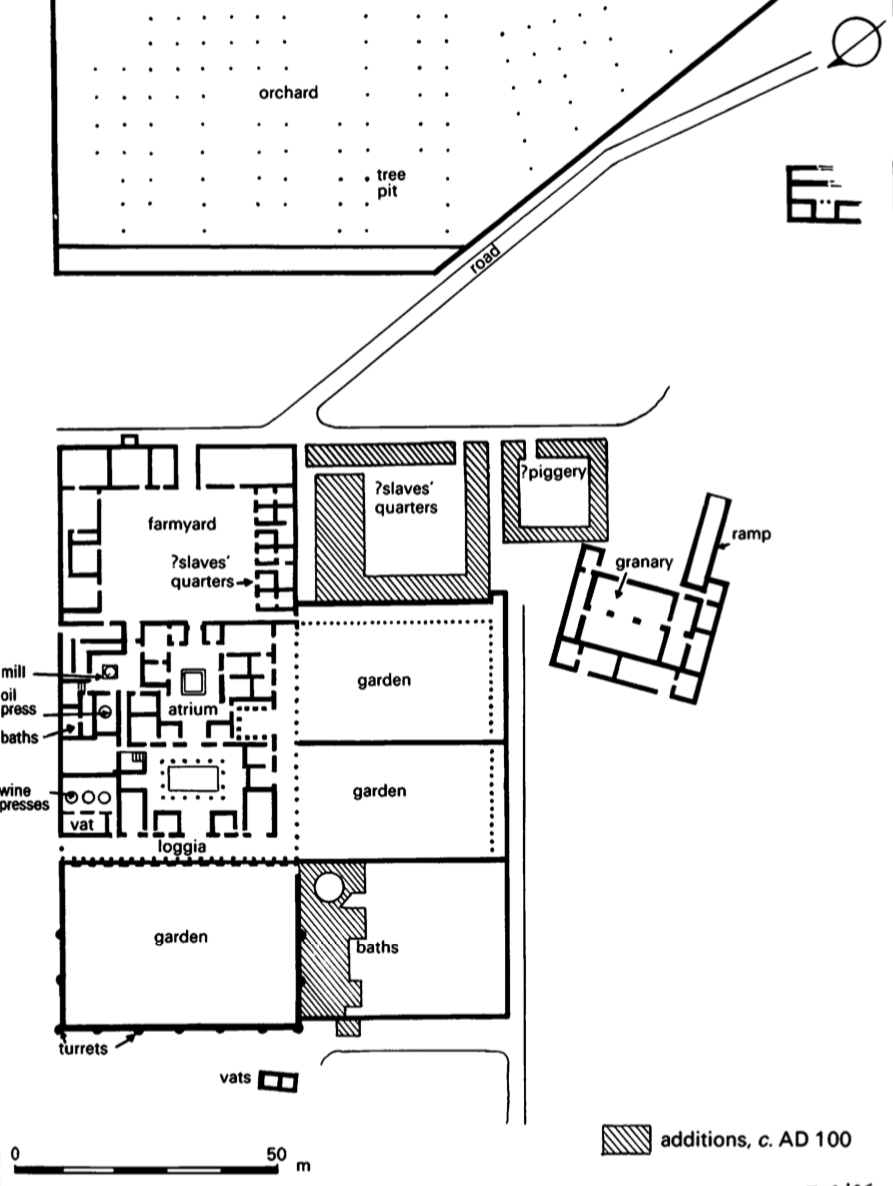
Plan with changes from 100 AD

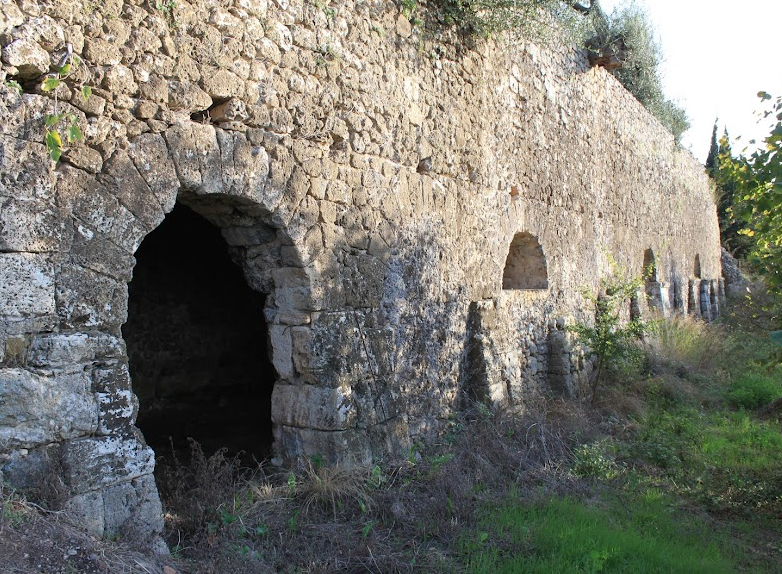
cryptoporticus

Settefinestre is best known for the site of the late Republican Roman slave-run villa excavated in 1976–81. It lies between Capalbio and Orbetello in Tuscany, Italy.

It was one of the first large Roman villas to be excavated and thoroughly published, and the exemplary archaeological excavations were a starting point for the new phase of science-supported field archaeology in Italy that led to a more detailed study of the occupation history of the Roman countryside and moved beyond the antiquarian tradition of villa studies.

It is also important as an example of the villas described in the ancient texts of Varro and Columella.

== History ==
The villa was located 3.5 km from Cosa in the Ager Cosanus, a Latin colonia founded in 273 BC. The area was linked to Rome by the Via Aurelia from about 241 BC. After the Second Punic War (218 to 201 BC) in which Hannibal had left a trail of devastation across Italy, the rich bought up both public land and the small farms of the poor. Like many Latin colonies, Cosa also suffered a crisis in the Roman Republican civil wars and became depopulated. As part of land redistribution, a group of great villas was assembled in the area, run by slave labour like the latifundia estates typical of southern Italy.

The villa was built on an earlier site in about 40-30 BC by the local Sestii family, as shown by brick stamps.

It prospered in the early 1st century AD and was enlarged with a massive cryptoporticus to support a terraced platform of 44 x 44 m.

In the Trajanic period, the villa underwent a major conversion; the guest apartment became the lodgings of a procurator with a separate entrance, all the production areas were moved out, while outside large baths were built in a part of the gardens. A piggery and extended slave quarters were added.

The villa still prospered in the age of the Antonines until about 175, after which the land probably ended up in the imperial estate and the buildings underwent a slow, progressive decline.

The villa was re-fortified at a later period and was again rebuilt as a villa in the more modern sense in the 15th century. The villa was renovated in the 1970s as a luxury holiday property with the ruins open to the public and picturesquely incorporated in the garden plan.

== The site ==
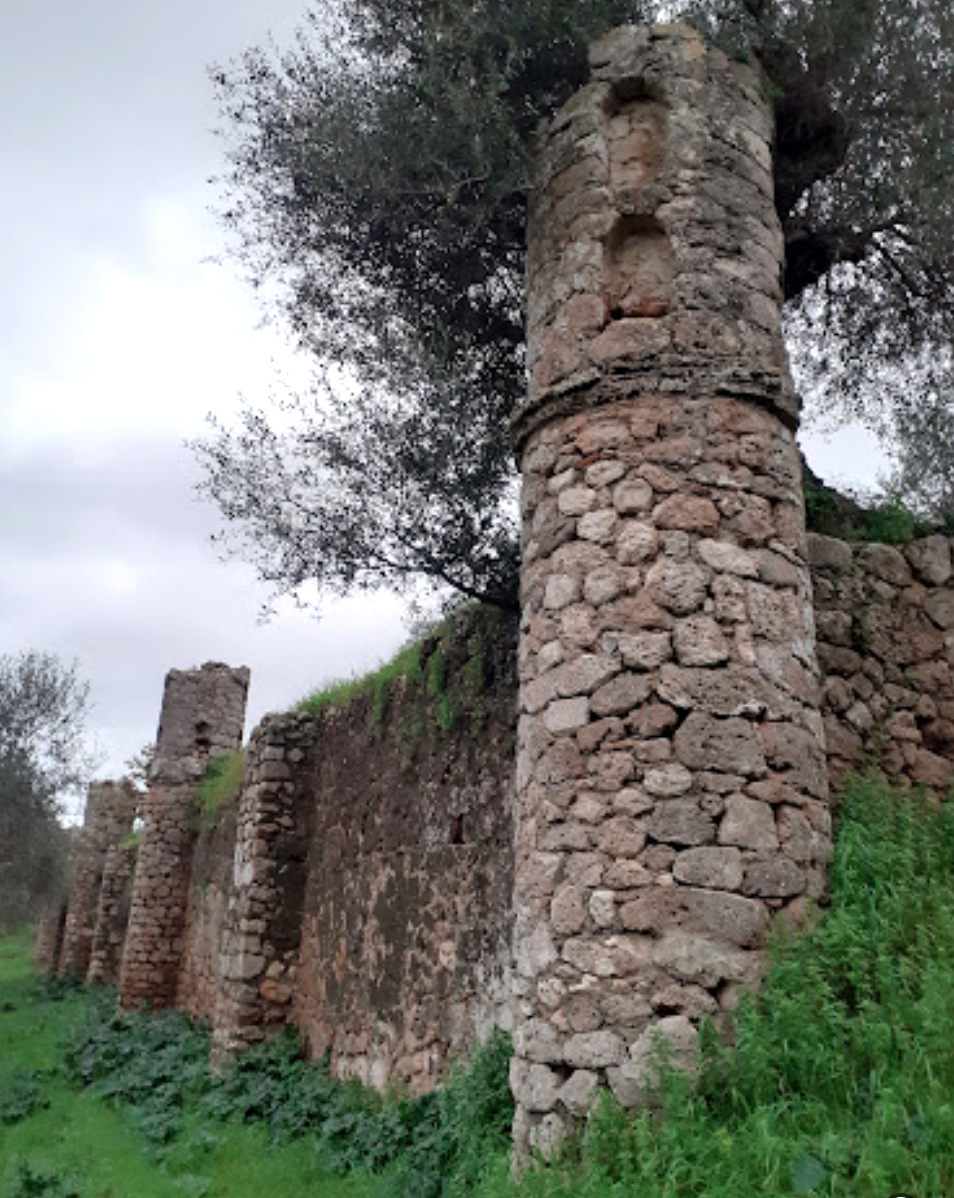
Settefinestre lower terrace wall

The villa seems to represent the ideal model of Varro, with its subdivision into pars urbana, rustica and fructuaria. The private part of the pars urbana was luxuriously decorated and centred around a peristyle while the guest rooms and pars rustica were built around an atrium and had a mosaic floor.

It was built on at least 2 terraces supported by cryptoportici, still visible, with gardens on the lower one and the main villa on the terrace above. An unusual feature visible today is the lower terrace wall with narrow towers as in a fortification, a local speciality common to other nearby villas, such as at "Le Colonne".

The main commercial product of Roman Villa Settefinestre was wine.

A fresco found at the site was recently restored and was on display at the museum in Orbetello.

Aside from the villa at Settefinestre, there are remains of comparable contemporary villas at Le Colonne (Capalbio) and La Provincia, and many remains of Roman buildings nearby.

== Sources ==
- Settefinestre: Una Villa Schiavistica Nell'Etruria Romana edited A. Carandini and A Ricci, (Modena, 1985) : several lavish volumes present the detailed report of the archaeology.
- Annalisa Marzano, Roman Villas in Central Italy: A Social and Economic History. (Brill, 2007)
