= John W. Hayes =

British archaeologist (1938–2024)

John Walker Hayes (21 May 1938 – 27 February 2024), often referred to as J.W. Hayes, was a British archaeologist. Hayes studied at the University of Cambridge and was curator at the Royal Ontario Museum in Toronto from 1968. He was an expert on Roman pottery, especially Eastern and North-African fine wares. Among his voluminous scholarship, his most significant works are Late Roman Pottery (1972) and Handbook of Mediterranean Roman Pottery (1997). He was honoured with the Gold Medal Award for Distinguished Archaeological Achievement by the Archaeological Institute of America in 1990. Hayes died on 27 February 2024, at the age of 85.
