= Russell T. Scott Jr. =

American classicist and historian

- Born: 8 December 1938; United States
- Died: 28 May 2024 (aged 85); Ardmore, Pennsylvania
- Education: Yale University
- Occupations: Classical scholar, ancient historian

Russell T. Scott Jr. (born December 8, 1938, in Lewiston, Idaho – died May 28, 2024, in Ardmore, Pennsylvania) was a prominent American Classicist and Ancient Historian known especially for his archaeological fieldwork at the ancient colonial city of Cosa and in the area of the House of the Vestals adjacent to the Forum Romanum in Rome. Scott was known by the nickname "Darby".

== Life ==
Scott was educated at Stanford University (B.A. in Classics and Philosophy, 1960) and Yale University (M.A. in classics, 1962; Ph.D. in classics, 1964). Scott joined the faculty of Bryn Mawr College in 1966 and taught there until his retirement in 2006. Frank Edward Brown supervised his work at Yale. While on the faculty at Bryn Mawr, Scott supervised 18 doctoral dissertations and 18 Master's-level papers.

== Selected works ==
- 1968. Religion and Philosophy in the Histories of Tacitus. Papers and Monographs of the American Academy in Rome, Volume XXII. Rome: the American Academy in Rome. Pp. xiv, 139.
- 1993. with Vincent J. Bruno. Cosa IV: the houses University Park, Pa.: Published for the American Academy in Rome by the Pennsylvania State University Press.
- 1993. with Ann Reynolds Scott. edd. Eius Virtutis Studiosi: Classical and Postclassical Studies in Memory of Frank Edward Brown (1908-1988). Washington, DC: National Gallery of Art.
- 2009. Excavations in the Area Sacra of Vesta (1987-1996). Ann Arbor, Michigan: Published for the American Academy in Rome by the University of Michigan Press.
- 2009. [Festschrift] Scott, Russell T., Paul B. Harvey, and Catherine Conybeare. Maxima Debetur Magistro Reverentia: Essays on Rome and the Roman Tradition in Honor of Russell T. Scott. Como: New Press.
