= Frank Edward Brown =

American archaeologist (1908–1988)

- Born: LaGrange, Illinois
- Died: Marco Island, Florida
- Citizenship: United States of America
- Occupation: Archaeologist
- Known for: Classical archaeology

Academic background
- Education: Yale University

Academic work
- Discipline: Classics

Frank Edward Brown (LaGrange, Illinois, USA, May 24, 1908 – Marco Island, Florida, February 28, 1988) was a preeminent Mediterranean archaeologist.

== Education ==
Educated at Carleton College in Northfield, Minnesota, (B.A. 1929), Brown went on to receive his doctorate at Yale University, with a dissertation on Plautus (Ph.D. 1938). He would then serve as Assistant Professor of Classics there until the United States entered World War II, during which time he served the Office of War Information in Syria and Lebanon. In 1945 he became Director-General of Antiquities of the Republic of Syria.

Brown first came to Rome and to the American Academy in 1931 as a graduate student of Yale University. Early a fellow of the American Academy in Rome, Brown went to Syria in 1932 to excavate at Dura-Europos with the joint Yale University- Académie des Inscriptions (France) mission under the direction of Franz Cumont and Michael Rostovtzeff and became field director at Dura in 1935.

== Fieldwork and career ==
His return to the American Academy in Rome from Syria in 1947 marked the beginning of the Academy's involvement in archaeological fieldwork in Italy with the excavations of the Latin colony of Cosa (Ansedonia) in southwestern Tuscany. Brown saw Cosa as a site that was useful a template for the archaeology of Latin colonies and mid-Republican Rome itself. Brown remained at the Academy as Professor-in-Charge of the Classical School and Director of Excavations from 1947–1952 and then returned to Yale as Professor of Classics where in addition to his teaching responsibilities he continued to be active in the publication of Dura-Europus and in the life of the American Schools of Oriental Research (ASOR), the offices of which were then in New Haven. He was Secretary of ASOR, 1955–1962; Master of Jonathan Edwards College, 1953–1956; and in collaboration with his Yale colleagues, Professors Lawrence Richardson, Jr. and Emeline Richardson, produced the second volume of the Cosa excavation reports, The Temples of the Arx (MAAR 1960). A generation of American Classical archaeologists and historians received their training under Brown at Cosa; notable among them are Lawrence Richardson, Jr., Emeline Hill Richardson, Russell T. Scott, and Stephen L. Dyson. The third volume on Cosa's forum and municipal buildings appeared after Brown's death.

In the same period, Brown served the Archaeological Institute of America as Trustee and Norton Lecturer. In 1963, however, Brown left Yale to return permanently to the American Academy in Rome, resuming the positions of Professor-in-Charge and Director of Excavations to which were added the responsibilities of the directorship of the Academy in 1965–1969. Nevertheless, these years saw him characteristically active both in Rome and in Ansedonia. In 1963 he made soundings in the church of Santa Maria in Aracoeli. At the invitation of the Archaeological Superintendency of Rome, he returned in 1964 to the Regia in the Roman Forum, a building of which he had made an architectural study during his years as a Fellow. The excavation of the Regia was to yield the most substantial evidence for the early organization and development of the Forum since the work of Giacomo Boni at the turn of the century. In 1965 he resumed work at Cosa supervising fieldwork and the preparation of additional publications of the Cosa series, and the design, construction, and outfitting of the site museum, since 1981 the National Museum of Cosa.

From Rome, he was also able to further the work of other American archaeologists in Italy and Yugoslavia, as well as the corpus of Roman mosaics in North Africa and the international project to safeguard the Punic and Roman antiquities of Carthage. While Director of the Academy, he was also President of the International Union of the Institutes of Archaeology, History, and the History of Art in Rome in 1966–1967, and he was active in the affairs of the International Association for Classical Archaeology throughout his years in Rome.

== Scholarship ==
Having resigned from the directorship of the Academy in 1969, Brown remained Professor in Charge of the Classical School until his retirement in 1976, when he received the Academy's Medal of Merit for his many years of outstanding service to that institution. He continued to serve the Academy thereafter as Thomas Spencer Jerome Lecturer in 1979, from which series came the book Cosa: The Making of a Roman Town (University of Michigan Press, 1980), and as the leader of a summer seminar sponsored by the National Endowment for the Humanities on the early colonies of Rome in 1980. In 1982 he was Senior Fellow at the Center for Advanced Study in the Visual Arts of the National Gallery in Washington where he continued to work on Vitruvius and returned to the study of the architecture of the Hierothesion of Antiochus I of Commagene at Nemrud Dagh, a project he had helped develop for ASOR in the 1950s. His last years in Rome were given over to the preparation of final reports on the excavations in the forum of Cosa and the Regia in the Roman Forum. On 21 April 1983, he was honored for his services to Italian archaeology by the city of Rome as a "Cultore di Roma".

== Honors ==
In Italy he was a foreign member of the Accademia Nazionale dei Lincei and of the Società Nazionale di Scienze, Lettere e Arti in Napoli, and the Istituto di Studi Etruschi ed Italici (Firenze), and a member of the Pontificia Accademia Romana di Archeologia and the German Archaeological Institute. In America, he was a member of ASOR, Archaeological Institute of America, and the American Philological Association. In March 1987 Frank Brown took leave of Rome and the American Academy to join his wife of 50 years, the former Jaquelin Goddard, in Florida.

He was awarded the Freedom of the Borough of Eastleigh in 1986.

== Publications ==
- Plautus, Titus Maccius. T. Macci Plauti Pseudolus, edited, with an introduction and notes, by Edgar H. Sturtevant in collaboration with Frank E. Brown, Frederick W. Schaefer and John P. Showerman. New Haven, Yale university press; London, H. Milford, Oxford University Press, 1932.
- The excavations at Dura-Europos, conducted by Yale University and the French Academy of Inscriptions and Letters. Final report ..., New Haven, Yale University Press, 1943-
- Brown, F.E., Richardson E. H. and Richardson, L. jr. "Cosa I, History and Topography." MAAR 20, 1951, 5-113.
- Cosa II: The temples of the Arx By Frank Edward Brown, Emeline Hill Richardson and L. Richardson. Rome: American Academy in Rome, 1960. Memoirs of the American Academy in Rome v. 26
- Roman architecture. New York: G. Braziller, 1961.
- Cosa: the making of a Roman town. Ann Arbor: University of Michigan Press, 1980.
- Cosa III: the buildings of the forum: colony, municipium, and village. By Frank Edward Brown, Emeline Hill Richardson, L. Richardson. University Park, Pa. : Published for the American Academy in Rome by Pennsylvania State University Press, 1993. Memoirs of the American Academy in Rome v. 37
- Eius virtutis studiosi: classical and postclassical studies in memory of Frank Edward Brown (1908-1988) edited by Russell T. Scott and Ann Reynolds Scott. Washington : National Gallery of Art, 1993.

== Necrology ==
- "Frank E. Brown Dies; Archeologist Was 79" The New York Times D-20 March 3, 1988
