= Norma Goldman =

American philologist and archaeologist (1922–2011)

Norma Wynick Goldman (March 30, 1922 – October 1, 2011) was an American classics scholar, author, professor at Wayne State University, and president of the Detroit Classical Association. Her works include textbooks of the Latin language as well as studies of Roman lamps, the architecture of the Janiculum Hill in Rome, and Roman costumes.

== Life and career ==
Norma Wynick was born in Pittsburgh on March 30, 1922, and moved with her family to Detroit as a teenager. She began her undergraduate studies at Wayne University (now Wayne State University) in 1939, graduated in 1944 with both bachelor's and master's degrees, as well as a teaching certificate, and in the same year married art historian Bernard Goldman.

After completing her doctorate, she taught in the Greek and Latin department at Wayne State University until 1993, when instead of retiring she moved to the Department of Interdependency. With Edith Kovach, she founded the Detroit Classical Association in 1957. In 2003 she founded the Society of Active Retirees with the goal of encouraging retired people to return to the classroom.

She died of a heart attack while battling cancer on October 1, 2011, in Fountain Hills, Arizona.

== Works ==
Goldman was the author, co-author, or editor of:

- Latin Via Ovid (with Jacob Nyenhius, 1977)
- English Grammar for Students of Latin: The Study Guide for Those Learning Latin (with Ladislas Szymanski, 1983) ISBN 9780934034340
- Practice! PractiSusan M. Hopkinsce!: A Latin Via Ovid Workbook (with Michael Rossi, 1993)
- Cosa: The Lamps (with Cleo Rickman Fitch, 1994) Memoirs of the American Academy in Rome, no. 39. Ann Arbor (Mich.): University of Michigan Press, 1994. ISBN 9780472105182
- New Light from Ancient Cosa: Classical Mediterranean Studies in Honor of Cleo Rickman Fitch (edited, 2001) New York: Lang, 2001. ISBN 9780820451411
- The Janus View From the American Academy in Rome: Essays on the Janiculum (edited with Katherine Geffcken, 2007) . New York: The American Academy of Rome, 2007. ISBN 9781879549159
- My Dura-Europos: the Letters of Susan M. Hopkins (edited with Bernard Goldman, 2011)
- Goldman, Norma Wynick, ed. New Light from Ancient Cosa: Classical Mediterranean Studies. New York: Lang, 2001. ISBN 9780820451411

== Recognition ==
Wayne State University gave Goldman their distinguished alumni award in 1985. The Classical Association of the Middle West and South gave her their Ovatio award in 1988, and the American Classical League gave her their Merita award in 2006.
