= Andrea Carandini =

Italian archaeologist (born 1937)

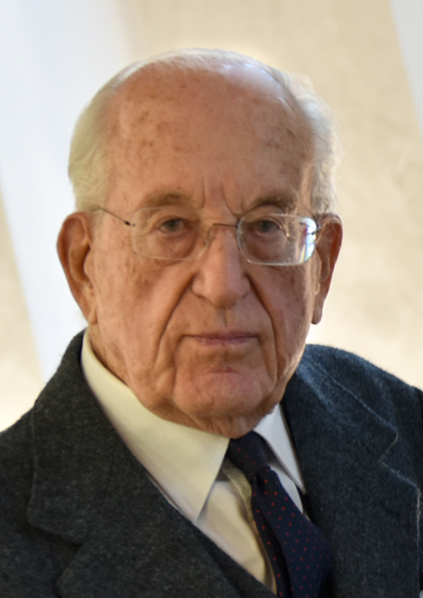
- Andrea Carandini, in 2022.
- Born: 3 November 1937; Rome, Italy
- Scientific career
- Fields: Archaeology
- Workplaces: Università di Roma La Sapienza
- Doctoral advisor: Ranuccio Bianchi Bandinelli

Andrea Carandini (born 3 November 1937) is an Italian professor of archaeology specialising in ancient Rome. Among his many excavations is the villa of Settefinestre.

== Biography ==
The son of Italian diplomat Count Nicolò Carandini (1896–1972), Andrea was born in Rome and became a member of the faculty of the University of Rome La Sapienza beginning in 1963. Carandini was a student of Ranuccio Bianchi Bandinelli, completing his laurea in 1962 with a thesis on the Roman villa of Piazza Armerina. His research is focused on the topography of ancient Rome, Etruria in the Roman period, and the analysis of monumental complexes in various cities in Italy including Volterra, Grumentum, Pompeii, and Veii. Since 1993 he has coordinated a project in Rome's suburbium and the Tiber Valley in conjunction with the Soprintendenza Archeologica and the Sovrintendenza Comunale di Roma. He continues to direct the excavations of the north slope of the Palatine Hill in Rome where important discoveries relating to the earliest city of Rome have been made, including the discovery of the famous Palatine Wall in 1988.

Carandini is the third cousin of actor Christopher Lee.

In the 1990s Carandini was also involved in the excavation of the Auditorium site in Rome, a substantial domestic structure dating to the fifth century B.C.; it is most likely to have been the monumental residence of an important clan (gens). Some of his views on the historicity of Romulus are controversial.

Carandini's Atlas of Ancient Rome appeared in English in 2017.

== Excavations ==
- 1964–1982: Piazza Armerina.
- 1966–1977: Ostia Antica.
- 1974–1985: Villa Settefinestre.
- 1985: Carthage.
- 1987–1992: Volterra.
- 1989: Tipasa.
- 1985: Palatine Hill, Rome.
- 1990–1993: Basilicata.
- 1993: Pompeii.
- 1996: Veii.
- 1996–1997: Parco della Musica, Rome.

== Publications ==
- Ricerche sullo stile e la cronologia dei mosaici della Villa di Piazza Armerina (1964)
- La secchia Doria: una "storia di Achille" tardo-antica. Contributo al problema dell'industria artistica di tradizione ellenistica in Egitto. (1965)
- Vibia Sabina : funzione politica, iconografia e il problema del classicismo adrianeo (1969)
- Schiavi e padroni nell'Etruria romana : la Villa di Settefinestre dallo scavo alla mostra (1979)
- Archeologia e cultura materiale: dai lavori senza gloria nell'antichità a una politica dei beni culturali (1979)
- Esclaves et maîtres en Etrurie romaine : les fouilles de la villa de Settefinestre : catalogue de l'exposition (1981)
- Filosofiana, la villa di Piazza Armerina : immagine di un aristocratico romano al tempo di Costantino (1982)
- La Romanizzazione dell'Etruria : il territorio di Vulci (1985)
- Settefinestre : una villa schiavistica nell'Etruria romana (1985)
- Schiavi in Italia : gli strumenti pensanti dei Romani fra tarda Repubblica e medio Impero (1988)
- Storie dalla terra. Manuale di scavo (1981) ISBN 9788806124113
- Roma: Romolo, Remo e la fondazione della città (2000) ISBN 9788843573295
- Archeologia del mito. Emozione e ragione fra primitivi e moderni (2002) ISBN 9788806162535
- Paesaggi d’Etruria. La Valle dell’Albegna, la valle d’Oro e la Valle del Chiarore (2002, with Franco Cambi, Mariagrazia Celuzza, Elizabeth Fentress, Ida Attolini) ISBN 9788884980588
- "Variations sur le thème de Romulus. Réflexions après la parution de l’ouvrage “La nascita di Roma”" (in De Boccard, La naissance de la ville dans l’Antiquité, 2003)
- "Il mito romuleo e le origini di Roma" (in M. Citroni, Memoria e identità. La cultura romana costruisce la sua immagine, 2003)
- La nascità di Roma. Dei, Lari, eroi e uomini all'alba di una civiltà (2003) ISBN 9788806164096
- Palatino, Velia e Sacra Via: Paesaggi urbani attraverso il tempo (2004) ISBN 9788884760142
- Remo e Romolo. Dai rioni dei Quiriti alla città dei Romani (775/750 - 700/675 a.C. circa) (2006) ISBN 9788806180652
- La leggenda di Roma (Lorenzo Argentieri, Paolo Carafa) 4 volumes. (Fondazione Lorenzo Valla; Mondadori,, 2006) ISBN 9788804538219
- "The Blessing of the Palatine and the Founding of Roma Quadrata," in Rome: Day One (2011), Princeton: Princeton University Press.
- with Paolo Carafa, Atlante di Roma antica : biografia e ritratti della città 2 v. (Milan: Electa, 2013) ISBN 9788837085100
- with Paola Carafa, The Atlas of Ancient Rome. Biography and Portraits of the City, in 2 volumes, (Princeton University Press, Princeton, New Jersey, 2017) ISBN 9780691163475
- Io, Agrippina Editore Laterza, 2020. ISBN 9788858141724
- Io, Nerone Editore Laterza, 2023. ISBN 9788858153727
