= Lawrence Richardson Jr. =

American classicist (1920–2013)

- Born: December 2, 1920; Altoona, Pennsylvania, US
- Died: July 21, 2013 (aged 92); Durham, North Carolina, US
- Spouse: Emeline Hill Richardson

Academic background
- Education: Yale University (BA, PhD)

Academic work
- Discipline: Classicist; Ancient historian
- Main interests: Roman architecture; Roman wall painting

Lawrence Richardson Jr. (December 2, 1920, in Altoona, Pennsylvania – July 21, 2013, in Durham, North Carolina) was an American classicist and ancient historian educated at Yale University who was a member of the faculty of classics at Duke University from 1966 to 1991. He was married to the classical archaeologist Emeline Hill Richardson. Richardson received numerous fellowships, including a Fulbright and a Guggenheim, and support from the American Council of Learned Societies. He was a Fellow of the American Academy in Rome (1950) and field director of the Academy's Cosa excavations (1952–1955). He was a resident of the American Academy in Rome (1979) and was its Mellon professor-in-charge of the School of Classical Studies (1981). In 2012 he was awarded the Gold Medal of the Archaeological Institute of America.

Richardson's research included interests in Roman domestic architecture, the sites of Pompeii and Cosa, and Roman wall painting.

== Publications ==
=== Theses ===
- 1944. Poetical theory in republican Rome; an analytical discussion of the shorter narrative hexameter poems written in Latin during the first century before Christ. Undergraduate prize essays: Yale university, vol. v. New Haven, Yale University Press; London, H. Milford, Oxford University Press.

=== Books ===
- 1977: Propertius: Elegies I-IV : Ed., with introd. and commentary. Norman OK: University of Oklahoma Press. ISBN 9780806113715.
- 1988: Pompeii: an architectural history. Baltimore: Johns Hopkins University Press. ISBN 9780801835339.
- 1992: A new topographical dictionary of ancient Rome. Baltimore: Johns Hopkins University Press. ISBN 9780801843006.
- 1993: F. E. Brown, E. H. Richardson, L. Richardson, Jr. Cosa III: The Buildings of the Forum. Colony, Municipium, and Village. (Memoirs of the American Academy in Rome, 37.) Pennsylvania State University Press.
- 1998: [Festschrift] L. Richardson Jr., M. T. Boatwright, and H. B. Evans. The shapes of city life in Rome and Pompeii : essays in honor of Lawrence Richardson, Jr. on the occasion of his retirement. New Rochelle, N.Y. : A.D. Caratzas. ISBN 9780892415663.
- 2000: A catalog of identifiable figure painters of ancient Pompeii, Herculaneum, and Stabiae. Baltimore: Johns Hopkins University Press. ISBN 9780801862359

=== Articles ===
- "Cosa and Rome: Comitium and Curia". Archaeology. 10 (1): 49–55. March 1957.

== Ph. D. students ==
1. James L. Franklin. 1975. The Chronology and Sequence of the Candidacies for Municipal Magistracies Attested by the Pompeian Parietal Inscriptions, A.D. 71-79. Ph.D. thesis], Duke University.

== Necrology ==
- "Lawrence Richardson, Jr., FAAR'50, RAAR'79" American Academy in Rome Society of Fellows
- The News & Observer on July 25, 2013
