= Elizabeth Fentress =

American archaeologist

Elizabeth Barringer Fentress FSA
- Education: University of Pennsylvania, University College London, University of Oxford
- Occupation: Archaeologist

Elizabeth Barringer Fentress is a Roman archaeologist who specialises in Italy and North Africa. She has collaborated on the excavation of numerous sites in the Western Mediterranean and published their results. She is also the originator and scientific director of the online database of excavations in Italy, Bulgaria and elsewhere Fasti Online (www.fastionline.org), and editor of its journal Fasti Online Documents & Research (FOLD&R). In 2021 she was awarded the Archaeological Institute of America's 2022 gold medal for distinguished archaeological achievement.

== Biography ==
Fentress was educated at the University of Pennsylvania (BA 1969 Latin), University College London (MA 1974 Etruscan and Roman Archaeology) and St Hugh's College, Oxford (DPhil 1979 Roman Archaeology, The Economic Effects of the Roman Army on Southern Numidia).

She was a visiting professor at University College London (2007–12), (2018-2023), Visiting Fellow of All Souls College, Oxford (2010) and Mellon Professor at the American Academy in Rome (1996–99).

Fentress is a former president of the International Association of Classical Archaeology (AIAC), corresponding member of the German Archaeological Institute and a Fellow of the Society of Antiquaries since 2006.

In 2003, she set up Fasti Online, an international database of Mediterranean archaeological excavation. Then in 2013, she was the winner of the first Archaeological Institute of America Award for Outstanding Digital Archaeology. She was an Honorary Visiting Professor at University College London between 2018 and 2023. She was awarded the Archaeological Institute of America's gold medal for distinguished archaeological achievement at the San Francisco meetings in January 2022. Most recently she initiated a new platform, the North African Heritage Archives Network NAHAN, an open- access repository for the archives of North African archaeology.

Her husband James Fentress was an anthropologist and historian.

== Scholarship ==
Her primary concentration has been on the application of archaeology to history of the longue durée in both the Italian Peninsula and the countries of North Africa. Her work has focused on social and economic aspects of Roman landscapes of all periods, with special regard to the interaction between Roman and non-Roman peoples at their points of contact in areas such as slave markets, the limes, urban areas like Cosa in Italy and Meninx, Utica, Sétif and Volubilis in North Africa and an imperial Villa, Villa Magna, in Italy. She is also a leader in the application of open-area, single-context stratigraphic excavation and intensive survey techniques, and she has directed or co-directed the following survey and excavation projects:

- Albegna Valley Survey, Italy (with M. Grazia Celuzza) 1979-84
- Setif, Algeria (with A. Mohamedi) 1979-85
- Cosa, Italy 1990-97
- Jerba, Tunisia; field survey of the island (with Renata Holod and Ali Drine) 1996-2001
- Volubilis, Morocco (with G. Palumbo and H. Limane) 2000-05 (with C. Fenwick and H. Limane) (2018-)
- S. Sebastiano at Alatri (with Caroline Goodson, M. Laird, S. Leone)
- Villa Magna, Italy 2006-10
- Utica, Tunisia (with I. Ben Jerbania, Josephine Quinn and Andrew Wilson) (2010–17)

== Publications ==
- Numidia and the Roman Army (1979)
- Fouilles de Setif 1977-1983 (1991)
- (with Michael Brett) The Berbers (1996)
- Romanization and the City, Creation, Transformations and Failures (2000)
- (with A. Carandini, F. Cambi and M. Grazia Celuzza) Paesaggi d'Etruria tra l'Albegna et la Fiora (2002)
- Cosa V: An intermittent town (2003)
- (with M. Laird, S. Leone, C. Goodson) Walls and Memory: the Abbey of San Sebastiano at Alatri (2005)
- (with R. Holod and A. Drine) An Island through time: Jerba Studies volume I (2009)
- (with Hendrik Dey) The Spaces of European Monasticism (2011)
- (with Patrice Cressier) La Céramique Islamique Maghrébine du haut Moyen Age (2011)
- (with C. Goodson, M. Maiuro) Villa Magna : an imperial estate and its legacies : excavations 2006-10 (2016)
- (with H. Limane) Volubilis après Rome. Les fouilles UCL/INSAP. 2000-2005 (2019)
- (with A. Rabinowitz) Slaving States: from West Africa to the Ancient Mediterranean Princeton University Press (2026)
