= Beulé Gate =

Fortified gateway on the Acropolis of Athens

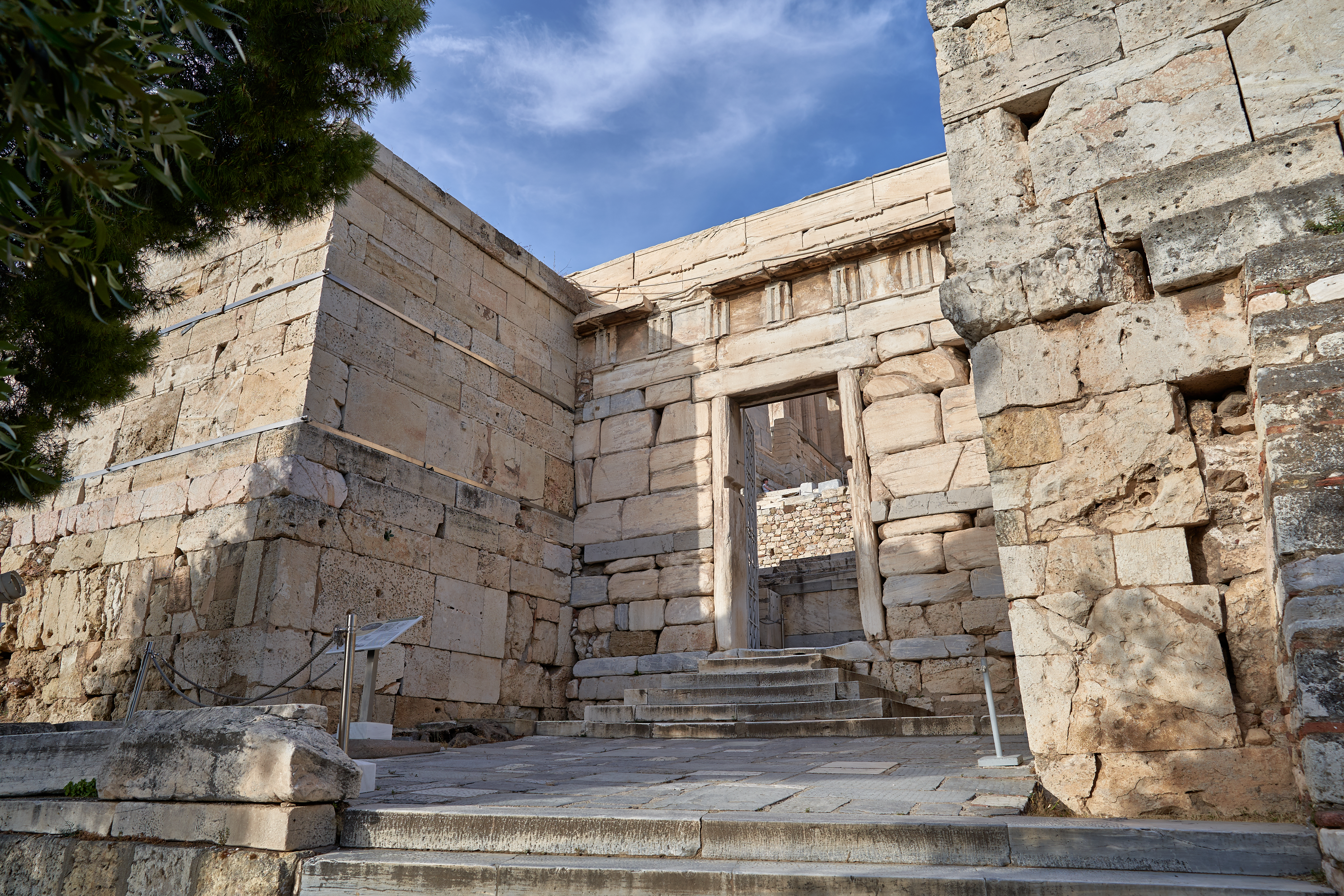
- Photograph of the Beulé Gate from the south-west

- Location of the Beulé Gate in central Athens
- 37°58′18″N 23°43′29″E
- Periods: Roman
- Cultures: Classical Greece
- Location: Acropolis of Athens, Greece

History
- Built: 3rd–4th century CE

Site notes
- Material: Marble
- Excavation dates: 1852–53
- Archaeologists: Charles Ernest Beulé
- Public access: Yes

UNESCO World Heritage Site
- Part of: Acropolis of Athens
- Reference: 404
- Inscription: 1987 (11th Session)

The Beulé Gate (French pronunciation: [bœ'le]) is a fortified gate, constructed in the Roman period, leading to the Propylaia of the Acropolis of Athens. It was constructed almost entirely from repurposed materials (spolia) taken from the Choragic Monument of Nikias, a monument built in the fourth century BCE and demolished between the second and fourth centuries CE. The dedicatory inscription from Nikias's monument is still visible in the entablature of the Beulé Gate.

The gate was integrated into the Post-Herulian Wall, a late Roman fortification built around the Acropolis in the years following the city's sack by the Germanic Heruli people in 267 or early 268 CE. Its construction marked the beginning of a new phase in the Acropolis's use, in which it came to be seen more as a potential defensive position than in the religious terms that had marked its use in the classical period. During the medieval period, the gate was further fortified and closed off, before being built over with a bastion in Ottoman times.

The monument was discovered by the French archaeologist Charles Ernest Beulé in 1852, and excavated between 1852 and 1853. Its discovery was greeted enthusiastically in France among the scholarly community and the press, though archaeologists and Greek commentators criticised the aggressive means – particularly the use of explosives – by which Beulé had carried out the excavation. In modern times, the gate has served primarily as an exit for tourists from the Acropolis.

== Description ==
The Beulé Gate is situated at the bottom of a monumental staircase, which led to the Propylaia approximately 37 m (120 ft) to the east. The staircase was constructed in the later first century CE, possibly at the instigation of the emperor Claudius (r. 41–54 CE). The gate includes two pylon-like towers, which project around 5 m (16 ft 5 in) from the structure. These towers are joined by walls to the terraces above, including that of the Temple of Athena Nike. The doorway is set into a marble wall and aligned with the main route through the Propylaia.

The gate is almost 23 m (80 ft) wide, with a central part around 7 m (20 ft) in both height and width. The area above the central doorway is decorated in the Doric order. It consists of an architrave in Pentelic marble, topped with marble metopes and triglyphs made from a variety of limestone known as poros stone. Above the metopes and triglyphs is a geison with mutules, itself topped with an attic. The doorway itself is 3.87 m (12 ft 8 in) high, 1.89 m (6 ft 2 in) wide at its base, and 1.73 m (5 ft 8 in) wide at the top. Within the doorway is a lintel added in the sixth century CE.

=== Entablature inscription ===
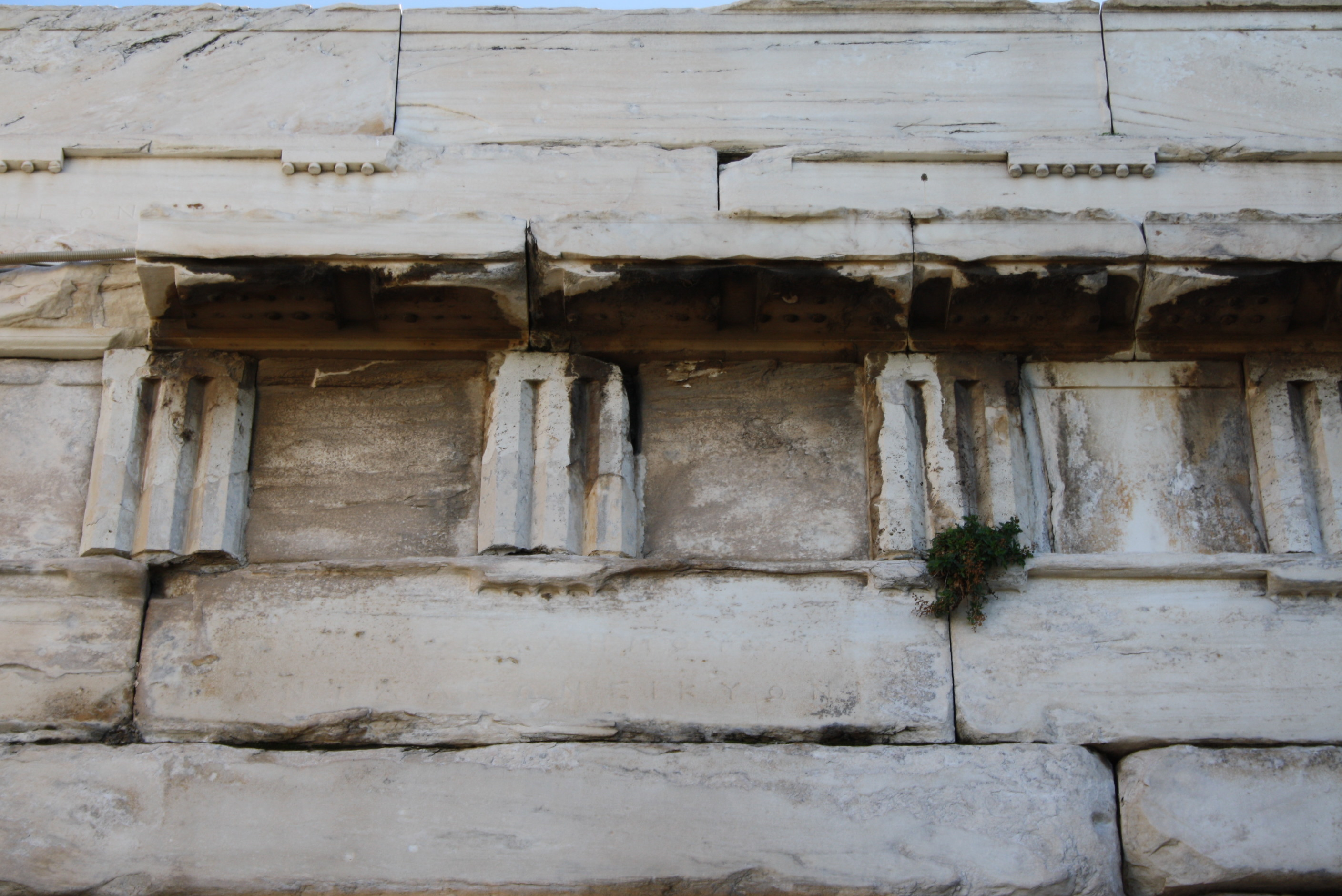
Detail of the entablature, showing the vertical triglyphs, metopes, geison and attic

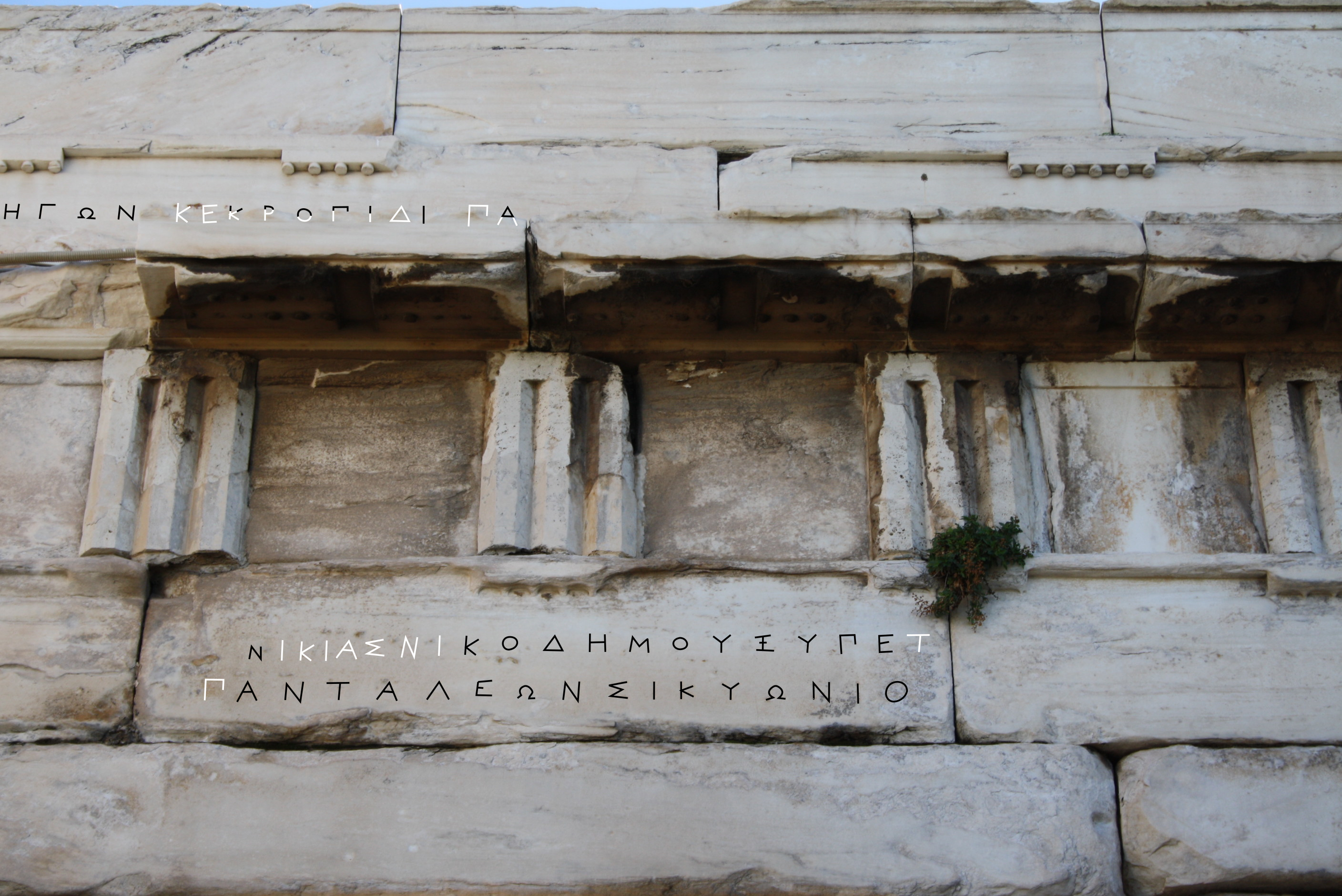
Trace of part of the inscription: legible letters marked in black, reconstructed letters in white

The inscription visible on the entablature was originally the dedicatory inscription of the Choragic Monument of Nikias, a structure built shortly after 320 BCE to commemorate the Athenian choregos Nikias and his victory in the choragic competitions of that year. As arranged on Nikias's monument, it reads as follows:

Νι[κ]ίας Νικοδήμου Ξυ[π]εταιὼν ἀνέθηκε νικήσας χορηγῶν Κεκροπίδι παίδων. Πανταλέων Σικυώνιο[ς] ηὔλει. ἆισμα· Ἐλπήνωρ Τιμοθέου· Νέ[αι]χμ[ο]ς ἦρχε.
Nikias, son of Nikodemos, of the deme of Xypete, set this up having won as choregos of the boys' chorus for Kekropis. Pantaleon of Sicyon played the aulos. The song performed was the Elpenor of Timotheos. Neaechmos was archon.

Nikias's monument was built in the form of a Greek temple in the Doric order, consisting of a square naos with a prostyle, hexastyle pronaos (that is, a front porch with a pediment and six columns). The inscription would originally have been placed across the architrave of Nikias's monument, and represents one of the latest such inscriptions from Hellenistic Athens. Under Demetrios of Phaleron, who governed Athens between 317 and 307 BCE, sumptuary laws to control aristocrats' ostentatious spending caused the construction of choragic monuments to cease. Throughout the remainder of the Hellenistic period, fashions in public art changed to favour statues of rulers and monumental buildings constructed by those rulers themselves.

== Date ==
The gate's discoverer, Charles Ernest Beulé, erroneously believed the gate to have been the original entrance to the Acropolis. Later research, beginning with that of Paul Graindor in 1914, established it as belonging to the late Roman period (c. 284 – c. 476 CE), and most probably to the late third or early fourth centuries CE. Scholarly opinion remains divided as to precisely when in that period it was built. (Note: Graindor 1914; Frantz 1982, pp. 35–36; Sironen 1994, pp. 28–29; Camp 2001, pp. 224–226; Rous 2019, p. 58. For the dates of the late Roman period, see Cameron 1993, pp. 1–2.)

The Beulé Gate is constructed almost entirely from marble pieces (spolia) taken from the Choragic Monument of Nikias. Nikias's monument was demolished at an uncertain date. In the 1880s, Wilhelm Dörpfeld suggested 161 CE, on the grounds of his belief that a foundation discovered underneath the Odeon of Herodes Atticus, constructed in that year, had originally belonged to the monument. In 1910, William Bell Dinsmoor disproved Dörpfeld's hypothesis by demonstrating that the Nikias monument had originally stood at the eastern end of the Stoa of Eumenes. (Note: Dinsmoor 1910, p. 482: for the early acceptance of Dinsmoor's work, see Chase 1911, pp. 114–115, Weller 1913, pp. 215–216, and later Hill 1953, p. 110.) Dinsmoor alternatively suggested that the demolition may have dated to the late third or early fourth centuries CE, a view since established as the scholarly consensus. (Note: Rous 2019, p. 58; see e.g. Wycherley 1978, p. 184, Camp 2001, pp. 224–226.) More precise proposed dates for the gate's construction include the reign of the Roman emperor Valerian (r. 253–260 CE) and the period around the sacking of Athens by the Heruli in 267 or early 268 CE – either slightly before the sack or around ten years afterwards. (Note: Rous 2019, pp. 57–61. For the sack and its date, see Chioti 2021.)

Diachronic plan of the Acropolis of Athens, showing the Beulé Gate (19). The Odeon of Herodes Atticus is numbered 20 and the Stoa of Eumenes 21. The original location of the Choragic Monument of Nikias is numbered 26.

The Beulé Gate shows architectural similarities with the Post-Herulian Wall, such as the use of alternating courses of differently coloured marble. The Post-Herulian Wall was built around the Acropolis about two decades after the sack of 267 or 268. Although the gate's date is not absolutely certain, it is generally agreed that the demolition of the Choragic Monument of Nikias, the construction of the Post-Herulian Wall and the building of the Beulé Gate were approximately contemporary. Most modern scholars consider that the gate was built in the aftermath of the sack. Judith Binder has suggested that the gate may have been constructed by Dexippos, the Athenian general who successfully defended the Acropolis against the Heruli during their invasion.

A stone reused in the Ottoman fortifications of the Acropolis preserves an inscription commemorating Flavius Septimius Marcellinus for having constructed "the gateway to the Acropolis from his own resources". (Note: Sironen 1994, p. 28; IG II^{2} 5206 = IG II^{2} 13291) The inscription gives Marcellinus's rank as lamprotatos (Ancient Greek: λαμπρότατος), a title equivalent to the Latin clarissimus and customarily used, after the early second century CE, to refer to men of senatorial rank. (Note: An older, obsolete reading gave the partial rank flam- (Ancient Greek: φλαμ-) for flamen (φλαμήν) or flaminalios (φλαμινάλιος), both priestly titles.) It also identifies him as a former agonothetes (ἀγωνοθέτης), a title given in Roman Athens to the officials responsible for funding and organising religious festivals, including the Panathenaia, the Dionysia, and games in honour of the imperial family. (Note: Geagan 1967, pp. 132–135. For the use of the agonothetes title for the Dionysia, see also Wilson 1999, p. 324.) The inscription has been dated to the mid-fourth century CE, after 325; it is generally, though not universally, assumed to be associated with the construction of the Beulé Gate.

== History ==
The archaeologist and philologist Walter Miller suggested in 1893 that the gate may have been built to replace an older, now-lost gateway, which he hypothesised would have been less strongly fortified. The Beulé Gate is believed to have been intended to safeguard the approach leading to the Klepsydra, a spring on the Acropolis which provided it with a safe supply of water in case of siege.

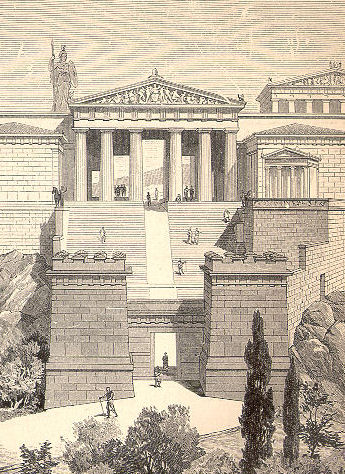
Reconstruction of the Acropolis in the 3rd century CE, showing the Beulé Gate (foreground, centre) with the Propylaia behind

During the demolition of the Choragic Monument of Nikias, some parts of the structure – the geisa – were numbered while still in situ, allowing them to be correctly reassembled within the gate. The Doric frieze of the Choragic Monument, built from limestone and marble, was reconstructed along the top of the Beulé Gate, though the architrave of the Choragic Monument, which originally formed a single horizontal beam, was divided into two parts, one above and one below the gate's frieze. Jeffrey M. Hurwit has described the re-use of the Choragic Monument as a "twice-told Classicism", since the original monument was itself modelled on the Propylaia, and so its re-use created architectural harmony between the Beulé Gate and the Propylaia to which it led.

Hurwit has called the construction of the gate a "turning point" in the Acropolis's history, suggesting that it represented a renewed emphasis on the Acropolis's role as a strategic fortification rather than as a religious sanctuary — making the site now "a fortress with temples". During the third or fourth century CE, a wooden roof was constructed along the gate's inner face; under the emperor Justinian (r. 527–565) another lintel was fitted to the gate's doorway, reducing its height. The gate remained the main entrance to the Acropolis during the Middle Byzantine period (c. 843 – c. 1261): during this time, another storey with a wooden roof was added to the whole structure, and a barrel vault, running from north to south, was constructed against the inner (eastern) side of the towers and the gate wall. Tasos Tanoulas has suggested that this work may have been carried out by Leo II, the Metropolitan of Athens between 1060 and 1069.

In 1204, after the Fourth Crusade, the Byzantine Empire was partitioned between Venice and the leaders of the crusade. Athens became the centre of the Duchy of Athens, a lordship initially held by the Burgundian (Note: It is unclear whether Othon originated from the County of Burgundy, within the Kingdom of Arles and the Holy Roman Empire, or the adjacent Duchy of Burgundy, a vassal of the kingdom of France. The medieval historian Jean Longnon considers the latter more likely, but both hypotheses unproven.) aristocrat Othon de la Roche. Between the thirteenth and fifteenth centuries, the city's Frankish rulers gradually refortified the Acropolis. The Beulé Gate was closed off during the reign of Othon's descendants, the de la Roche family, which lasted until 1308; a vaulted structure was also built in the gate's north tower to brace it during the same period. (Note: Tanoulas 1997b, p. 311. For the dates of the de la Roche dynasty, see Setton 1975, p. 211.) The medieval period also saw the closing off of the Propylaia, which was further reinforced with the Frankish Tower at an uncertain date.

The gate's previous role as an entrance to the Acropolis was taken over by the gate situated at the western foot of the large classical bastion on which the Temple of Athena Nike was built. The medieval notary Niccolò da Martoni, who visited Athens in February 1395, wrote an account suggesting that the Beulé Gate was still visible, though no longer used. (Note: Tanoulas 1997b, p. 286. On Niccolò da Martoni, see Agrigoroaei 2020, particularly pp. 324–326.) At some point in the Ottoman period (1458–1827), the gate's towers were heightened and a bastion was constructed on top of it: (Note: Haussoullier 1888, p. 41; Tanoulas 1997b, pp. 293–294. For the dates of the Ottoman period, see Kolovos 2021, p. 254.) (Note: Beulé dated the Ottoman bastion to the end of the fifteenth century.) this bastion was visible in drawings made by the British antiquary William Gell in 1801–1806. When Beulé excavated the bastion, he reported finding evidence that the gate had been damaged by gunpowder weapons before the bastion's construction. By the nineteenth century, knowledge of the gate's existence was lost.

== Excavation ==
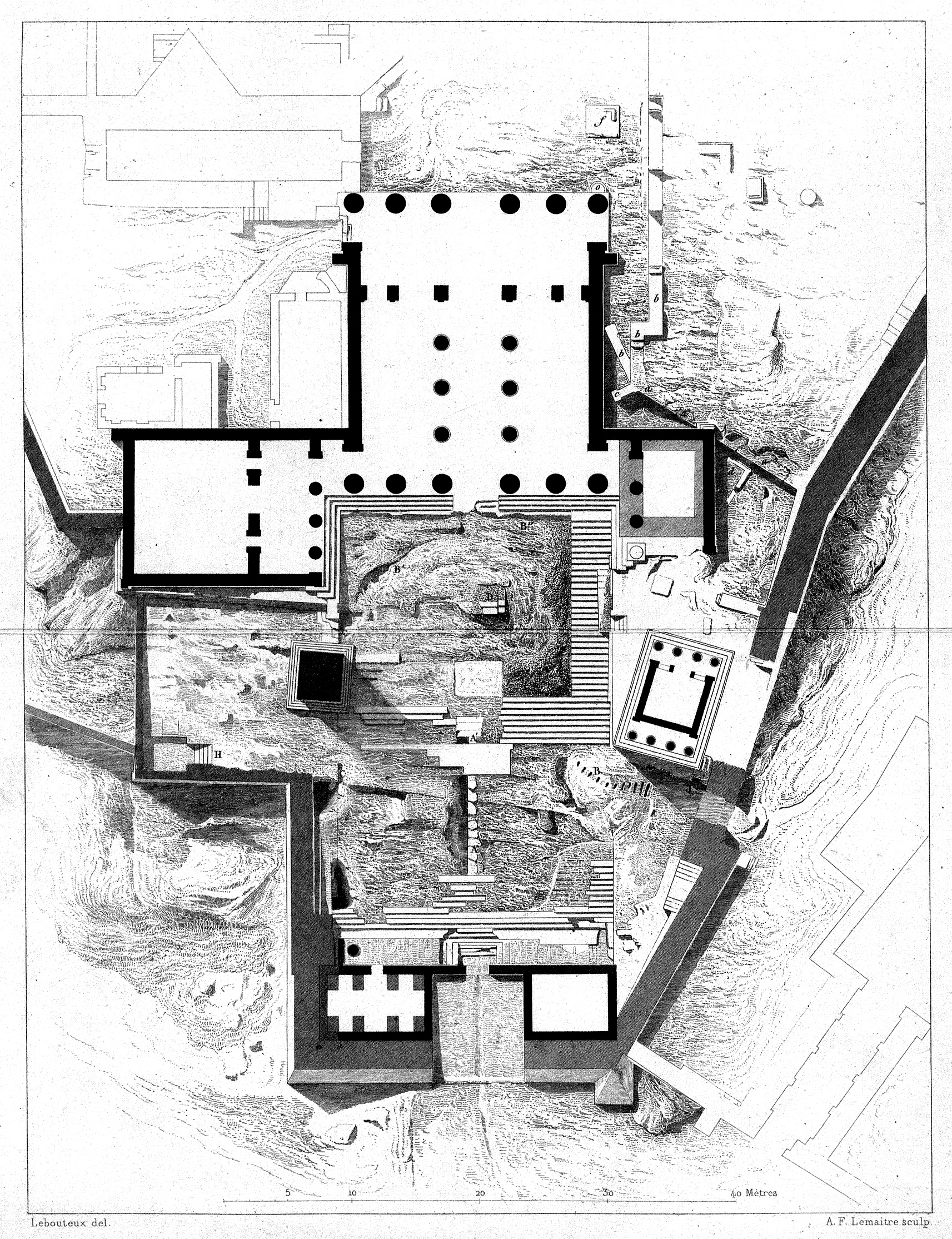
Beulé's plan of the entrance to the Acropolis of Athens. The Beulé Gate is at the bottom (west) of the image.

The gate is named for Charles Ernest Beulé, a member of the French School at Athens, who discovered the gate in 1852. The first of Athens's foreign schools of archaeology, the French School had been founded in 1846 with the aim of carrying out excavations and classical scholarship, as well as of enhancing French prestige, particularly vis-à-vis British archaeology. Beulé had joined the French School in 1849, and discovered the gate while excavating the approach to the Propylaia under the direction of Kyriakos Pittakis, the Greek Ephor General of Antiquities. The historian Jean-Michel Leniaud has called the excavation "the first of the great archaeological transformations" carried out on the Acropolis; Tanoulas describes it as the most important archaeological project of the mid-nineteenth century at the site.

The existence of a lower route to the Propylaia had become evident during the operations to clear and repair the monuments of the Acropolis following the end of the Greek War of Independence in 1829. In 1846, the architect and archaeologist Auguste Titeux began to reveal the staircase leading up to the Propylaia, but archaeologists did not generally consider that there had been a second gateway below it. Titeux died in 1846 with his work on the staircase unfinished: in 1850, Pittakis completed the work of clearing it and partially reconstructing the steps.

Pittakis enlisted Beulé to assist with the removal of medieval and modern structures from the rest of the Propylaia area in 1852. Beulé, against the prevailing scholarly opinion of his time, believed that Mnesikles, the architect of the Propylaia, had originally constructed a second gateway, and secured Pittakis's blessing as well as support from Alexandre de Forth-Rouen, the French ambassador to Greece, to investigate his hypothesis. On 16 May [O.S. 4 May], (Note: Greece adopted the Gregorian calendar in 1923; 28 February [O.S. 15 February] was followed by 1 March.) the excavators discovered more steps leading towards the gate, and by 29 May [O.S. 17 May] it had become clear that they had found the edge of a fortified wall around the Acropolis, and within it a gateway. The site was visited by King Otto and Queen Amalia of Greece, and the discovery made Beulé's scholarly reputation.

Beulé left Athens for France at the beginning of June, returning in December to direct renewed excavations, now focused on the gate. On 5 January 1853 [O.S. 24 December 1852], work was temporarily halted when the Greek Minister for War ordered the excavators to leave, concerned that the excavation would destroy the Acropolis's defensive value in case of a future invasion; Beulé, with the support of the French embassy, was able to persuade the Greek authorities that the Acropolis had little military value anyway, and "would not hold out for twenty-four hours against an assault".

When work was able to resume in 1853, the excavators encountered a particularly stubborn block of mortar through which their tools could not penetrate. Beulé secured a batch of explosives from sailors of the Station du Levant, a fleet of the French Navy tasked with patrolling the Aegean Sea, and used 150 lb (68 kg) of gunpowder to blast through the block. Contemporary archaeologists criticised his actions, as did the Greek newspapers, one of which had previously accused Beulé of wanting to blow up everything on the Acropolis. (Note: Baelen 1958, p. 98. For the quantity of explosives, see Beulé 1854, p. 291.) Pittakis, who had been watching the operation, was almost struck by a fragment of the debris, which pierced his hat: reports circulated in the aftermath that he had been killed.

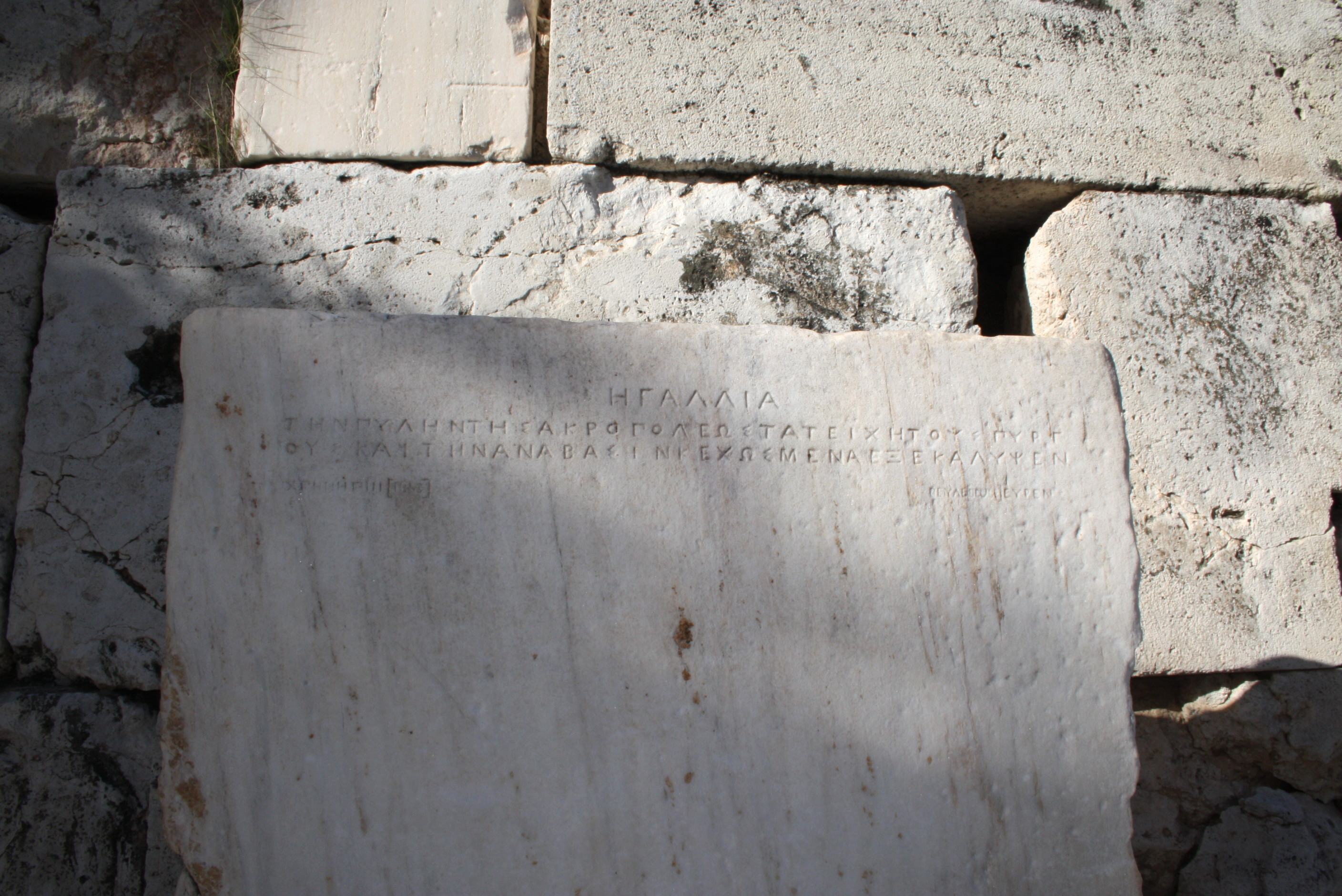
The commemorative inscription erected by Beulé in 1853

By 12 April [O.S. 31 March] 1853, the two towers had been fully revealed, followed by the gateway itself on 13 April [O.S. 1 April]. The excavations finished that month; the monument was formally opened in a ceremony on 11 May [O.S. 28 April]. Beulé fixed a commemorative stone, recovered during the excavations, to the right of the gate's entrance. He had it inscribed in Ancient Greek:

Η ΓΑΛΛΙΑ ΤΗΝ ΠΥΛΗN ΤΗΣ ΑΚΡΟΠΟΛΕΩΣ, ΤΑ ΤΕΙΧΗ ΤΟΥ ΠΥΡΓΟΥ, ΚΑΙ ΤΗΝ ΑΝΑΒΑΣΙΝ ΚΕΧΩΣΜΕΝΑ ΕΞΕΚΑΛΥΨΕΝ. ΒΕΥΛΗ ΕΥΡΕΝ.
France discovered and unearthed the gate of the Acropolis, the walls of the tower, and the ascending road, which were previously buried. Beulé found them.

Beulé also reported having inscribed a French translation of the same inscription below the Greek text. The discovery of the gate prompted scholarly celebration in France, and was reported with enthusiasm in the French press. The diplomat and philhellene Jean Baelan has written that the excavation turned Beulé into "the standard-bearer for national honour in the field of archaeology". In recognition of Beulé's discovery, the Académie Française made the Acropolis of Athens the topic for its Grand Prize for Poetry (Note: French: grand prix de poésie.) in 1853, which was won by Louise Colet. The British historian Thomas Henry Dyer praised Beulé's discovery, but correctly questioned his assertion that the gate had been built under Mnesikles, and criticised Beulé's commemorative inscription, calling it "somewhat vainglorious". Ludwig Ross, who had preceded Pittakis as Ephor General, described the inscription as "an example of petty national and personal vanity" and predicted that it was likely to be stolen or removed by the Greeks.

After its excavation, the Beulé Gate resumed its original function as a monumental gateway for the Acropolis. In the 1960s, the main entrance was moved to the south-east side, leaving the Beulé Gate as primarily an exit.

== Gallery ==
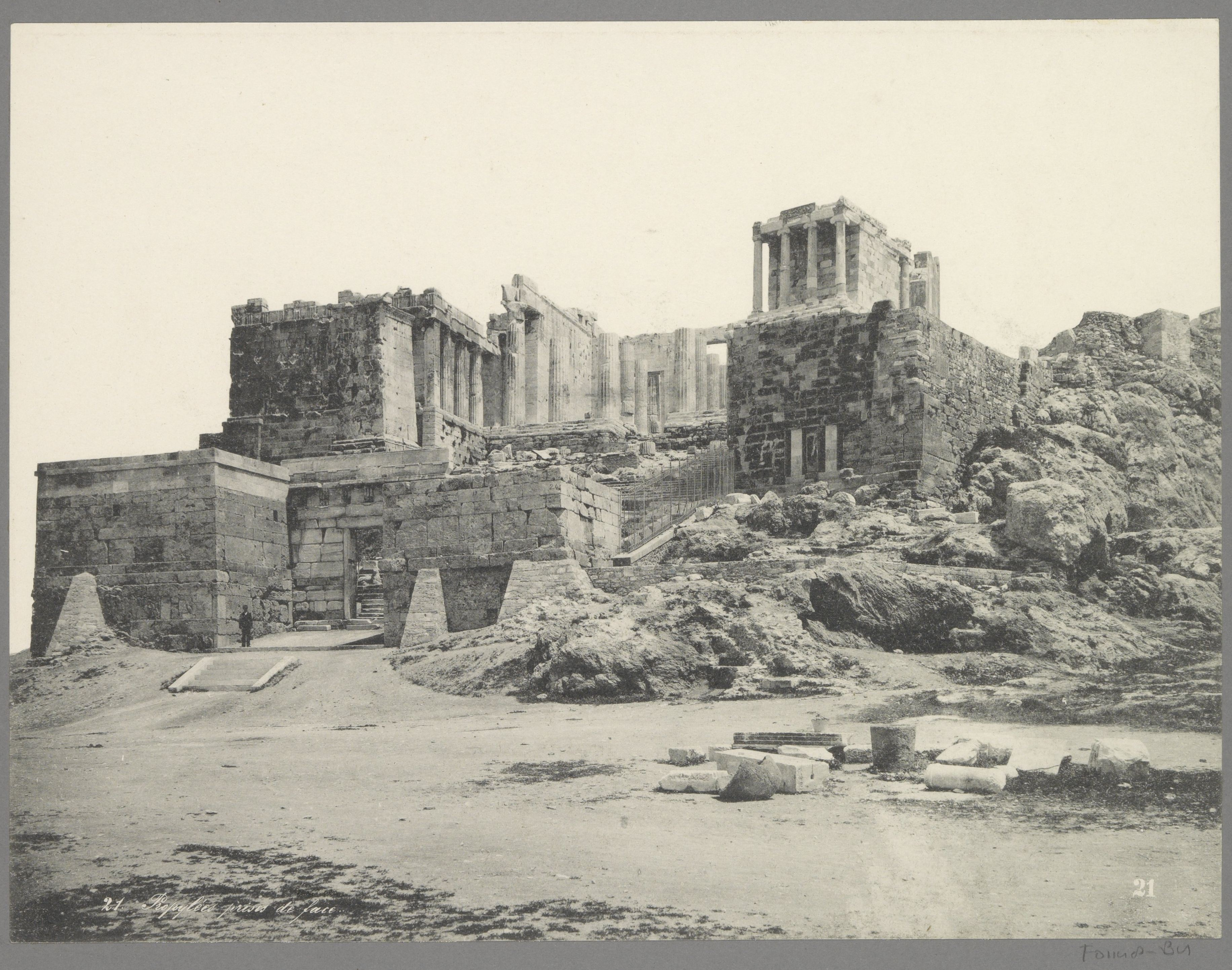
Photographed between 1875 and 1893

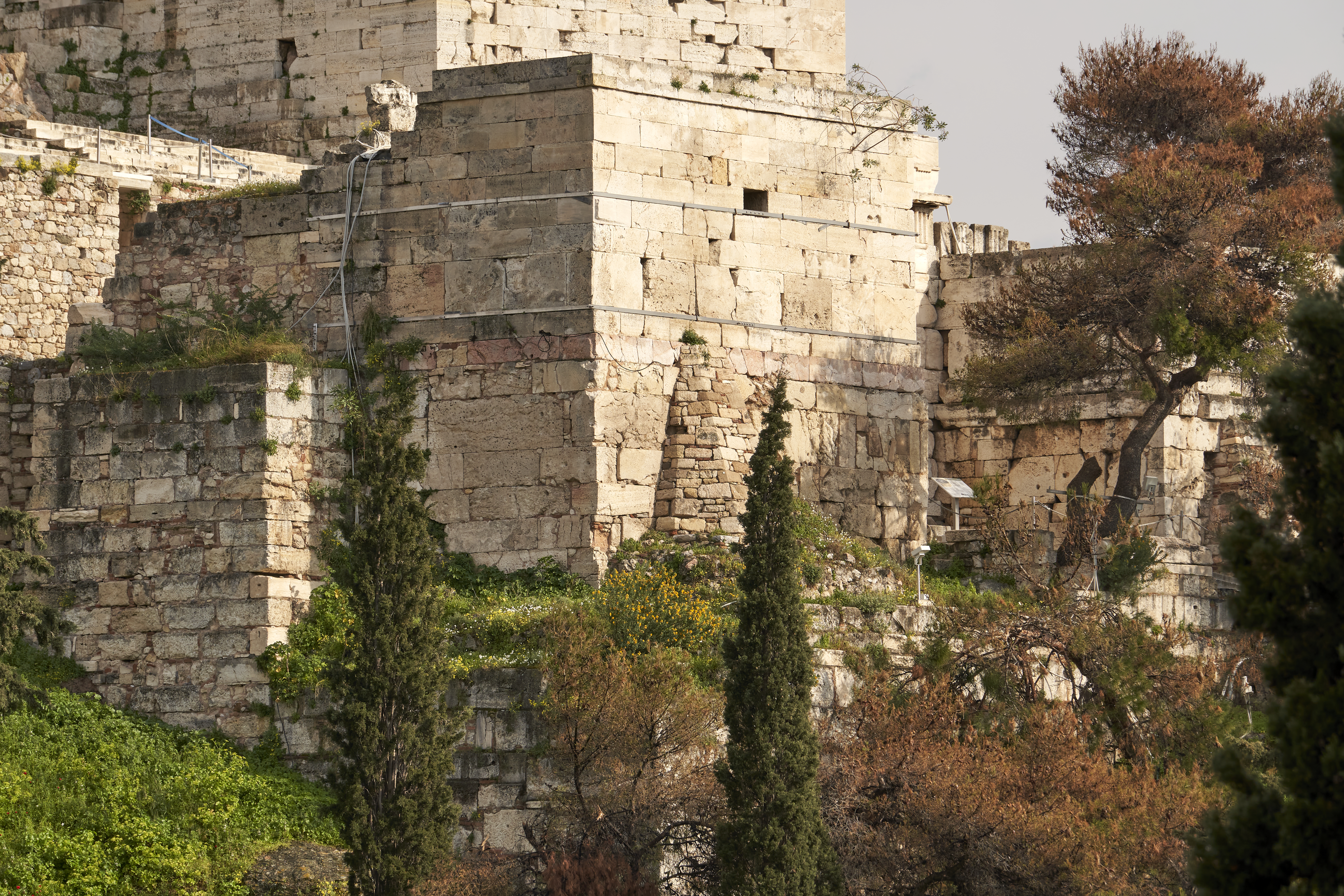
View of the gate from the north-west

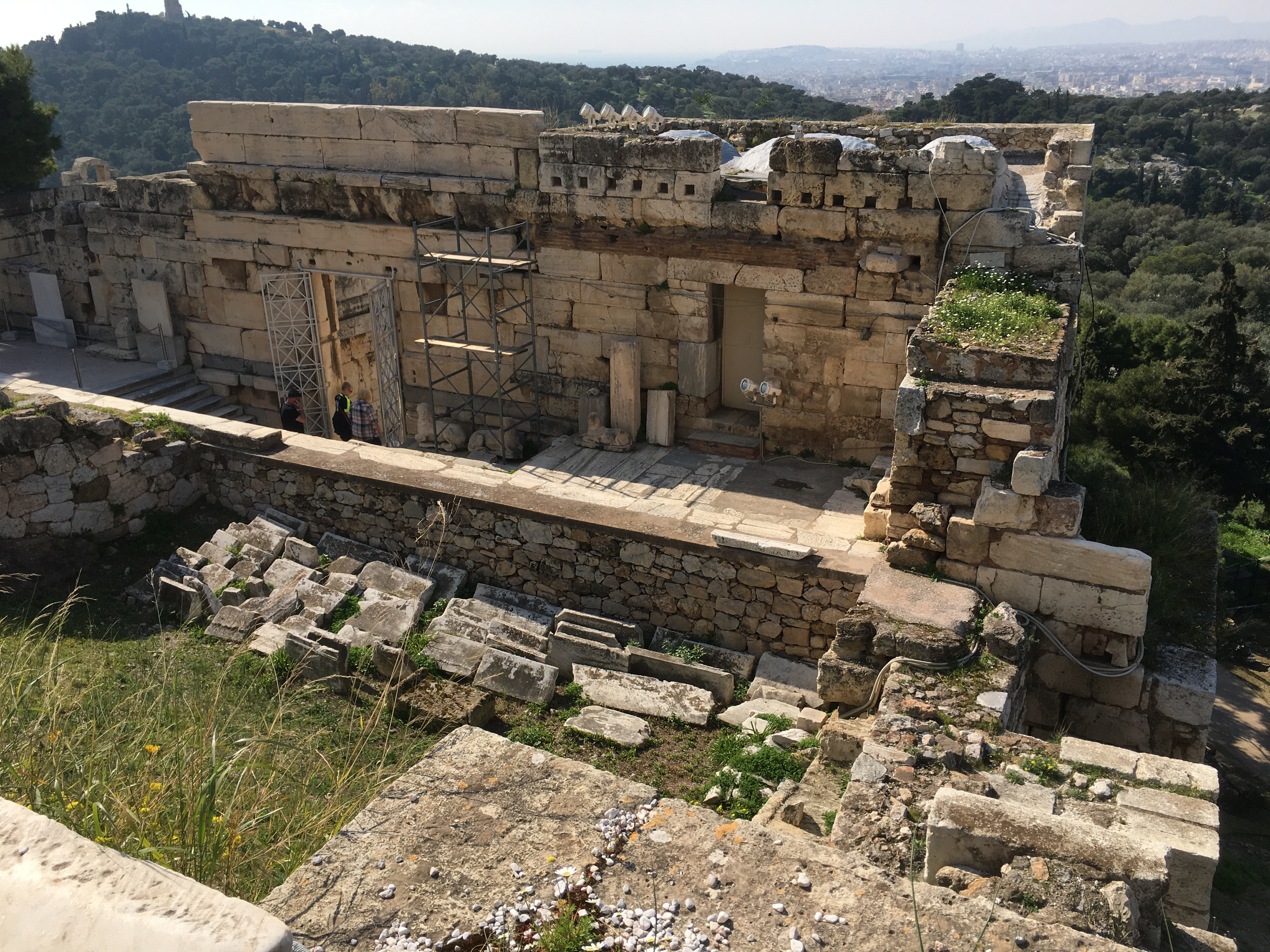
Back of the gate, viewed from the north-east

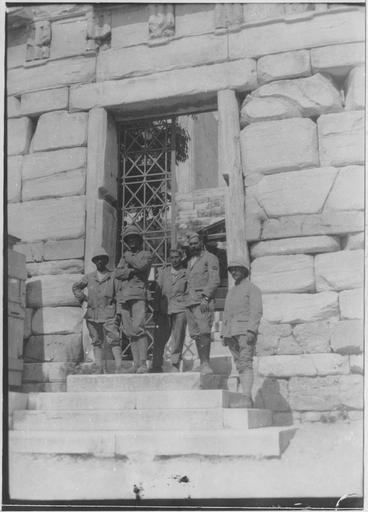
French troops during the Allied occupation of Athens (Noemvriana), 1917

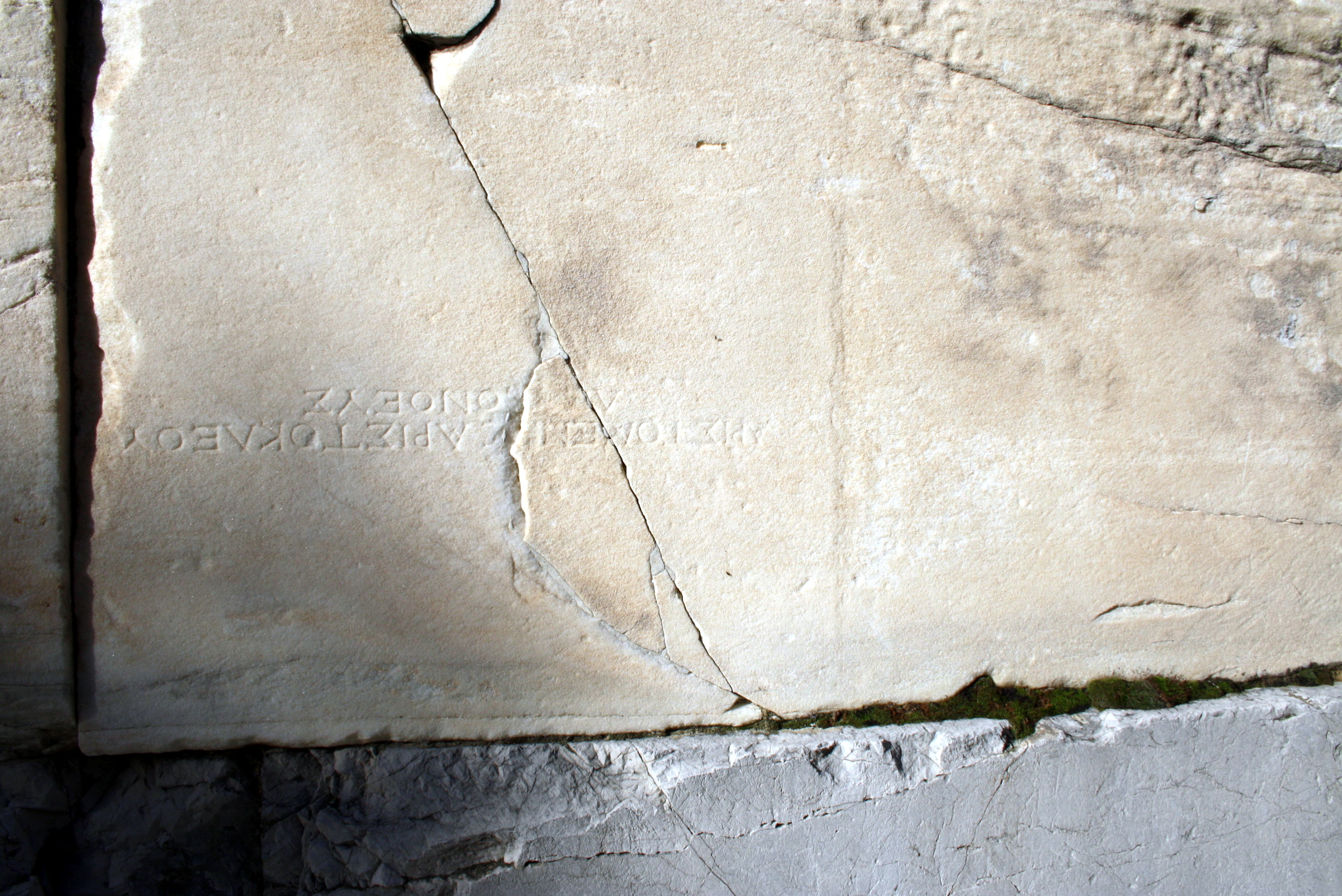
A stone of the gate, repurposed from an older monument: an inscription, now upside-down, is visible.

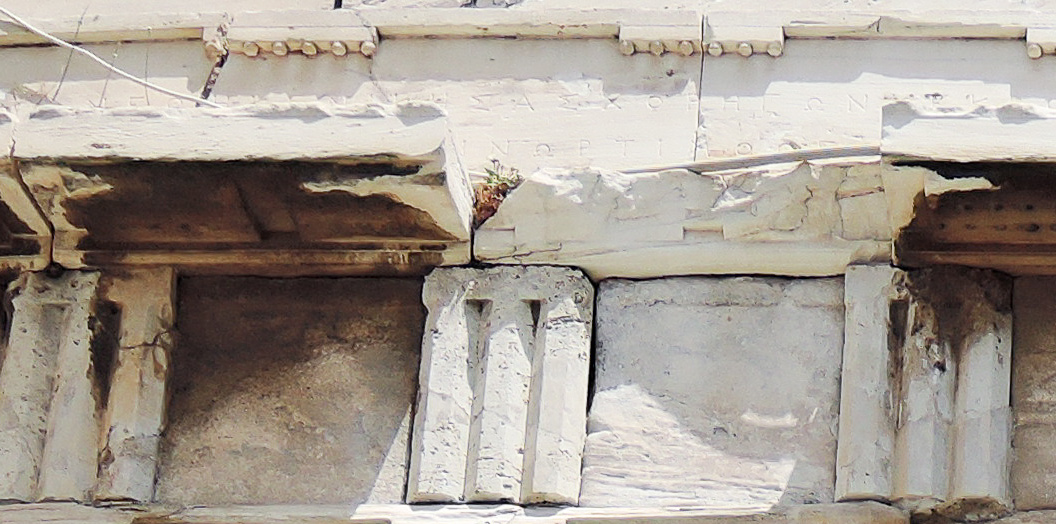
Close-up of part of the entabulature, showing inscribed letters at top centre

== Bibliography ==
- Agrigoroaei, Vladimir (2020). "Recreational Tourism, Make-Believe Antiquity, and the Trivial Origins of the Renaissance in Niccolo da Martoni's Travels through Latin-Occupied Greece". Itineraria. 19: 321–395. ISSN 2975-142X – via Academia.edu.
- Anderson, William James; Spiers, Richard Phené; Dinsmoor, William Bell (1927). The Architecture of Ancient Greece: An Account of Its Historic Development: Being the First Part of The Architecture of Greece and Rome. Vol. 1. London: B. T. Batsford. ISBN 978-0-404-14725-9.
- Baelen, Jean (1958). "La porte Beulé et le prix de poésie de 1854" [The Beulé Gate and the Poetry Prize of 1854]. Bulletin de l'Association Guillaume Budé (in French). 1 (2): 92–116. doi:10.3406/bude.1958.3823. ISSN 2802-3080.
- Beulé, Charles Ernest (1853). L'Acropole d'Athènes [The Acropolis of Athens] (in French) (1st ed.). Paris: Firmin Didot frères, fils et cie. OCLC 176879281.
- Beulé, Charles Ernest (1854). "1er Rapport, adressé à M. le Ministre de l'instruction publique et des cultes par M. Ernest Beulé, sur l'Acropole d'Athènes. Athènes, le 17 janvier 1853" [1st Report, Addressed to M. the Minister for Public Education and Religion, by M. Ernest Beulé, on the Acropolis of Athens, Athens, 17 January 1853]. Archives des missions scientifiques et littéraires [Archives of Scientific and Literary Missions] (in French). 3: 289–307. ISSN 1256-3854.
- Beulé, Charles Ernest (1862) [1853]. L'Acropole d'Athènes [The Acropolis of Athens] (in French) (2nd ed.). Paris: Firmin Didot frères, fils et cie. OCLC 16929013.
- Billard, Yves; Chandezon, Christophe (2012). "Ernest Beulé (1826–1874). Archéologie classique, histoire romaine et politique sous Napoléon III" [Ernest Beulé (1826–1874). Classical Archaeology, Roman History and Politics under Napoleon III]. Liame (in French). 24. doi:10.4000/liame.277. ISSN 2264-623X.
- Bodnar, Edward W. (1960). Cyriacus of Ancona and Athens. Collection Latomus. Vol. 43. Brussels: Latomus. OCLC 1284459.
- Cameron, Averil (1993). The Later Roman Empire, AD 284–430. Cambridge MA: Harvard University Press. ISBN 978-0-674-51194-1.
- Camp, John M. (2001). The Archaeology of Athens. New Haven: Yale University Press. ISBN 978-0-300-13815-3.
- Chase, George Henry (1911). "Archaeology in 1910: Part II". The Classical Journal. 7 (3): 114–125. ISSN 0009-8353. JSTOR 3286990.
- Chioti, Lamprini (2021). "The Herulian Invasion in Athens (A.D. 267)". In Fachard, Sylvian; Harris, Edward M. (eds.). The Destruction of Cities in the Ancient Greek World: Integrating the Archaeological and Literary Evidence. Cambridge: Cambridge University Press. pp. 319–339. doi:10.1017/9781108850292. ISBN 978-1-108-85029-2.
- Delis, Apostolis (2016). "A Hub of Piracy in the Aegean: Syros during the Greek War of Independence". In Harlaftis, Gelina; Dimitropoulos, Dimitris; Starkey, David J. (eds.). Corsairs and Pirates in the Eastern Mediterranean: Fifteenth to Nineteenth Centuries. Athens: Sylvia Ioannou Foundation. pp. 41–54. ISBN 978-960-87792-5-9.
- Dickins, Guy (2014) [1912]. Catalogue of the Acropolis Museum: Volume 1, Archaic Sculpture. Cambridge: Cambridge University Press. ISBN 978-1-107-41801-1.
- Dinsmoor, William Bell (1910). "The Choragic Monument of Nicias". American Journal of Archaeology. 14 (4): 459–484. doi:10.2307/497149. ISSN 0002-9114. JSTOR 497149. S2CID 191360396.
- Dinsmoor, William Bell (1973) [1902]. The Architecture of Ancient Greece: An Account of Its Historic Development. New York: Biblio and Tannen. ISBN 978-0-8196-0283-1.
- Dyer, Thomas Henry (1873). Ancient Athens: Its History, Topography and Remains. London: Bell and Daldy. OCLC 2195750 – via Internet Archive.
- Frantz, Alison (1982). "The Date of the Phaidros Bema in the Theater of Dionysos". Studies in Athenian Architecture, Sculpture and Topography Presented to Homer A. Thompson. Hesperia Supplements. Vol. 20. Princeton: American School of Classical Studies at Athens. pp. 34–39, 194–195. doi:10.2307/1353943. JSTOR 1353943. OCLC 8050699.
- Frantz, Alison (1988). Late Antiquity: AD 267–700 (PDF). The Athenian Agora. Vol. XXIV. Princeton: American School of Classical Studies at Athens. ISBN 0-87661-224-9.
- Geagan, Daniel J. (1967). The Athenian Constitution After Sulla. Hesperia Supplements. Vol. 12. Princeton: American School of Classical Studies at Athens. OCLC 434280.
- Graindor, Paul (1914). "L'entrée de l'Acropole sous l'Empire" [The Entrance of the Acropolis Under the Empire]. Bulletin de Correspondance Hellénique (in French). 38: 272–295. doi:10.3406/bch.1914.3123. ISSN 2241-0104.
- Haussoullier, Bernard (1888). Grèce: guide. Guides Joanne (in French). Paris: Hachette. pp. 41–42. OCLC 457578778.
- Hendrickx, Benjamin (2015). "Les duchés de l'Empire latin de Constantinople après 1204: origine, structures et statuts" [The Duchies of the Latin Empire of Constantinople after 1204. Origin, Structures and Statutes]. Revue belge de philologie et d'histoire (in French). 93 (2): 303–328. doi:10.3406/rbph.2015.8837. ISSN 2295-9068.
- Hill, Ida Thallon (1953). The Ancient City of Athens: Its Topography and Monuments. Cambridge MA: Harvard University Press. OCLC 1154172699.
- Hoppin, James Mason (1897). Greek Art on Greek Soil. Boston and New York: Houghton Mifflin. OCLC 1062172.
- Hurwit, Jeffrey M. (1999). The Athenian Acropolis: History, Mythology, and Archaeology from the Neolithic Era to the Present. Cambridge: Cambridge University Press. ISBN 0-521-42834-3.
- Kiminas, Demetrius (2009). The Ecumenical Patriarchate. San Bernardino: The Borgo Press. ISBN 978-1-4344-5876-6.
- Kolovos, Elias (2021). "Maria Georgopoulou & Konstantinos Thanasakis (ed.). 2019. Ottoman Athens: Archaeology, Topography, History. Athens: The Gennadius Library & The Aikaterini Laskaridis Foundation; 978-9-6099-9453-8 Hardback £30". Antiquity. 96 (385): 254–256. doi:10.15184/aqy.2021.176. ISSN 1745-1744. S2CID 245272826.
- Lalonde, Gerald (2021) [2005]. Horos Dios: An Athenian Shrine and Cult of Zeus. Monumenta Graeca et Romana. Vol. 11. Leiden: Brill. ISBN 978-90-474-1739-2.
- Leniaud, Jean-Michel (2002). Les archipels du passé : Le patrimoine et son histoire [The Archipelagos of the Past: Heritage and its History] (in French). Paris: Fayard. ISBN 978-2-213-65690-8.
- Lock, Peter (1986). "The Frankish Towers of Central Greece". The Annual of the British School at Athens. 81: 101–123. doi:10.1017/S0068245400020104. ISSN 2045-2403. S2CID 129263771.
- Longnon, Jean (1973). "Les premiers ducs d'Athènes et leur famille" [The First Dukes of Athens and Their Family]. Journal des Savants (in French). 1: 61–80. ISSN 0021-8103.
- Lyons, Claire L. (2005). Antiquity & Photography: Early Views of Ancient Mediterranean Sites. Los Angeles: Getty Publications. ISBN 978-0-89236-805-1.
- Makri, Efterpi; Tsakos, Konstantinos; Vavylopoulou-Charitonidou, Angeliki (1989). Το Ριζόκαστρο: Σωζόμενα υπολείμματα: Νέες παρατηρήσεις και επαναχρονολόγηση [Rizokastro: Surviving Remains: New Observations and Re-Dating]. Δελτίον της Χριστιανικής Αρχαιολογικής Εταιρείας (in Greek). 14: 329–366. ISSN 1105-5758. Archived from the original (PDF) on 21 February 2023.
- Mallan, Christopher; Davenport, Caillan (2015). "Dexippus and the Gothic Invasions: Interpreting the New Vienna Fragment (Codex Vindobonensis Hist. gr. 73, ff. 192^{v}–193^{r})". Journal of Roman Studies. 15: 203–226. doi:10.1017/S0075435815000970. ISSN 1753-528X. S2CID 163234044.
- Mallouchou-Tufano, Fani (2007). "The Vicissitudes of the Athenian Acropolis in the Nineteenth Century: From Castle to Monument". In Valavanis, Panos (ed.). Great Moments in Greek Archaeology. Athens: Kapon Press. pp. 36–57. ISBN 978-0-89236-910-2.
- Manakidou, Eleni (2018) [2012]. "Politics and Society". In Smith, Tyler Jo; Plantzos, Dimitris (eds.). A Companion to Greek Art. Chichester: Blackwell. pp. 414–439. ISBN 9781119266815.
- Mark, Ira S. (1993). The Sanctuary of Athena Nike in Athens: Architectural Stages and Chronology. Baltimore: American School of Classical Studies at Athens. ISBN 978-0-87661-526-3.
- Millar, Fergus (2002) [1983]. "Empire and City, Augustus to Julian: Obligations, Excuses, and Status". Rome, the Greek World, and the East. Vol. 2. Chapel Hill: University of North Carolina Press. pp. 336–371. ISBN 978-0-8078-5520-1.
- Miller, Walter (1893). "A History of the Akropolis of Athens". The American Journal of Archaeology. 8 (4): 473–556. doi:10.2307/495887. ISSN 0002-9114. JSTOR 495887.
- Petrakos, Vasileios (1996). "L'École française d'Athènes vue par les Grecs" [The French School of Athens Seen by the Greeks]. Bulletin de Correspondance Hellénique [Bulletin de Correspondance Hellénique] (in French). 120 (1): 501–509. doi:10.3406/bch.1996.4614. ISSN 2241-0104.
- Rogers, Dylan K. (2021). "Roman Athens". In Neils, Jenifer; Rogers, Dylan (eds.). The Cambridge Companion to Ancient Athens. Cambridge: Cambridge University Press. pp. 421–436. doi:10.1017/9781108614054. ISBN 978-1-108-61405-4. S2CID 243691800.
- Ross, Ludwig (1861) [1855]. "L'Acropole d'Athènes, par E. Beulé, ancien membre de l'école d'Athènes. 2 Bde. 8. Paris 1853–54" [The Acropolis of Athens, by E. Beulé, Former Member of the School of Athens. 2 vols. 8. Paris 1853–54]. In Keil, Karl (ed.). Archäologische Aufsätze von Ludwig Ross [Archaeological Essays of Ludwig Ross] (in German). Vol. 2. Leipzig: B. G. Teubner. pp. 268–279. OCLC 458217029 – via Google Books.
- Rous, Sarah A. (2019). Reset in Stone: Memory and Reuse in Ancient Athens. Madison: University of Wisconsin Press. pp. 57–61. ISBN 978-0-299-32280-9.
- Setton, Kenneth M. (1975). Athens in the Middle Ages. London: Variorum Reprints. ISBN 978-5-88501-407-6.
- Setton, Kenneth M. (1991) [1976]. The Papacy and the Levant (1204–1571), Volume I: The Thirteenth and Fourteenth Centuries. Philadelphia: The American Philosophical Society. ISBN 978-0-87169-114-9.
- Shear, T. Leslie (1981). "Athens: From City-State to Provincial Town". Hesperia. 50 (4): 356–377. doi:10.2307/147878. ISSN 1553-5622. JSTOR 147878.
- Sironen, Erkki (1994). "Life and Administration of Late Roman Attica in the Light of Public Inscriptions". In Castrén, Paavo (ed.). Post-Herulian Athens: Aspects of Life and Culture in Athens A.D. 267–529. Helsinki: Finnish Institute at Athens. pp. 15–62. ISBN 978-951-95295-2-3.
- St Clair, William (2022). St Clair, David; Barnes, Lucy (eds.). Who Saved the Parthenon? A New History of the Acropolis Before, During and After the Greek Revolution (PDF). Cambridge: Open Book Publishers. doi:10.11647/OBP.0136. ISBN 978-1-78374-461-9. S2CID 248842303. Archived from the original (PDF) on 27 May 2022.
- Tanoulas, Tasos (1997a). Τα Προπύλαια της Αθηναϊκής Ακρόπολης κατά τον Μεσαίωνα [The Propylaia of the Athenian Acropolis in the Middle Ages] (PDF) (in Greek). Vol. 1. Athens: Archaeological Society of Athens. OCLC 7350278735.
- Tanoulas, Tasos (1997b). Τα Προπύλαια της Αθηναϊκής Ακρόπολης κατά τον Μεσαίωνα [The Propylaia of the Athenian Acropolis in the Middle Ages] (PDF) (in Greek). Vol. 2. Athens: Archaeological Society of Athens. OCLC 7350278735.
- Weller, Charles Heald (1913). Athens and Its Monuments. New York: The Macmillan Company. OCLC 2649584 – via Internet Archive.
- Whitling, Frederick (2019). Western Ways: Foreign Schools in Rome and Athens. Berlin, Boston: De Gruyter. doi:10.1515/9783110602531. ISBN 978-3-11-060253-1. S2CID 189506180.
- Wilson, Peter J. (1999) [1996]. "Choregia". In Hornblower, Simon; Spawforth, Anthony (eds.). The Oxford Classical Dictionary (3rd ed.). Oxford: Oxford University Press. pp. 323–324. ISBN 978-0-19-866172-6.
- Wycherley, Richard Ernest (1978). The Stones of Athens. Princeton: Princeton University Press. ISBN 0-691-60970-5.
