= Choragic Monument of Nikias =

Building constructed 320–319 BCE

Coordinates: 37°58′13″N 23°43′37″E

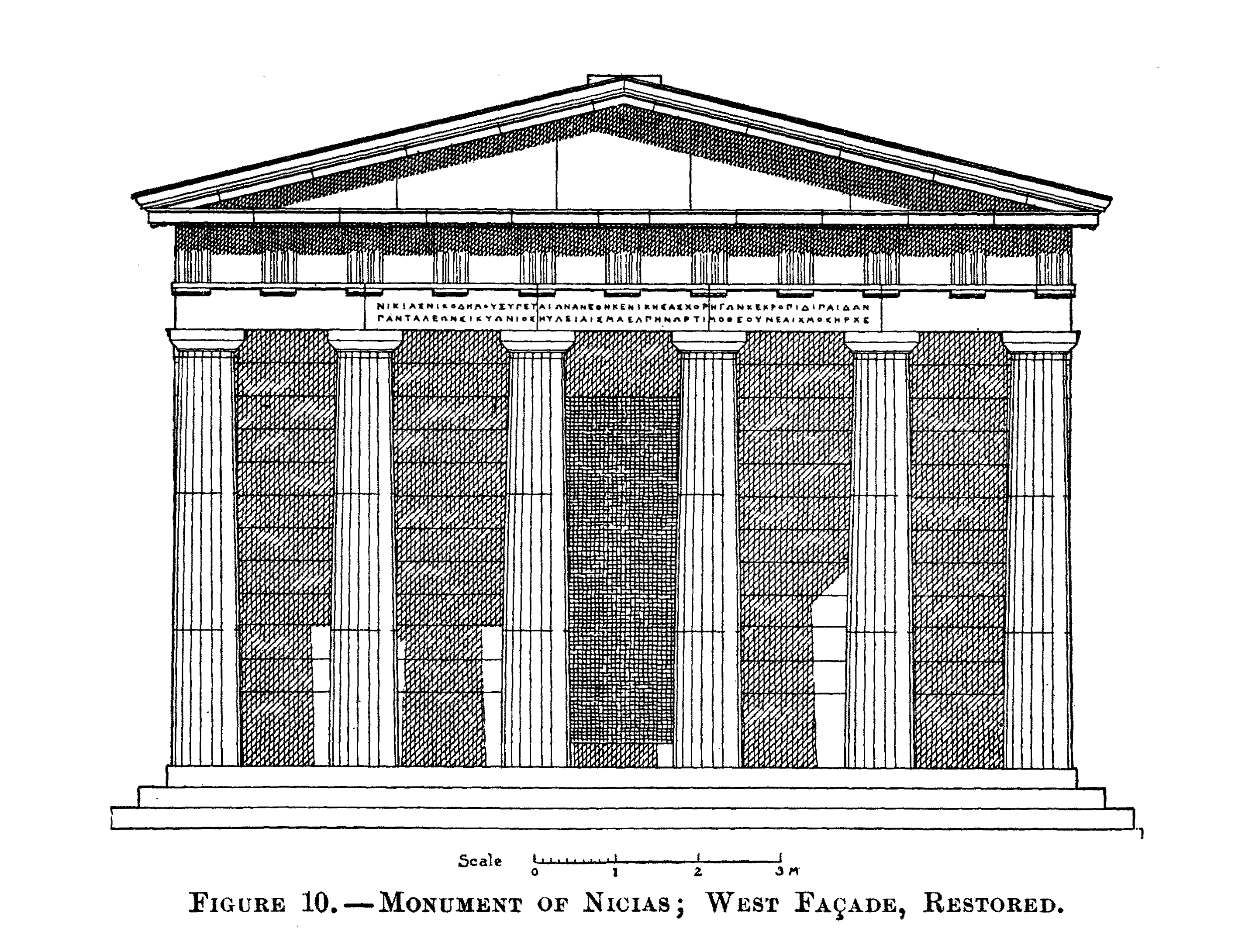
Reconstruction of the facade of the Choragic Monument of Nikias by William Dinsmoor

The Choragic Monument of Nikias is a memorial building built on the Acropolis of Athens in 320–319 BCE to commemorate the choregos Nikias, son of Nikodemos. It was situated between the Theatre of Dionysos and the Stoa of Eumenes where its foundations remain along with some fragmentary elements of the structure. It was built in the form of a substantial hexastyle Doric temple with a square cella and might have been surmounted with the prize tripod of the Dionysia. The monument was dismantled at some point in late antiquity and the masonry reused in the Beulé Gate.

== Archaeology ==
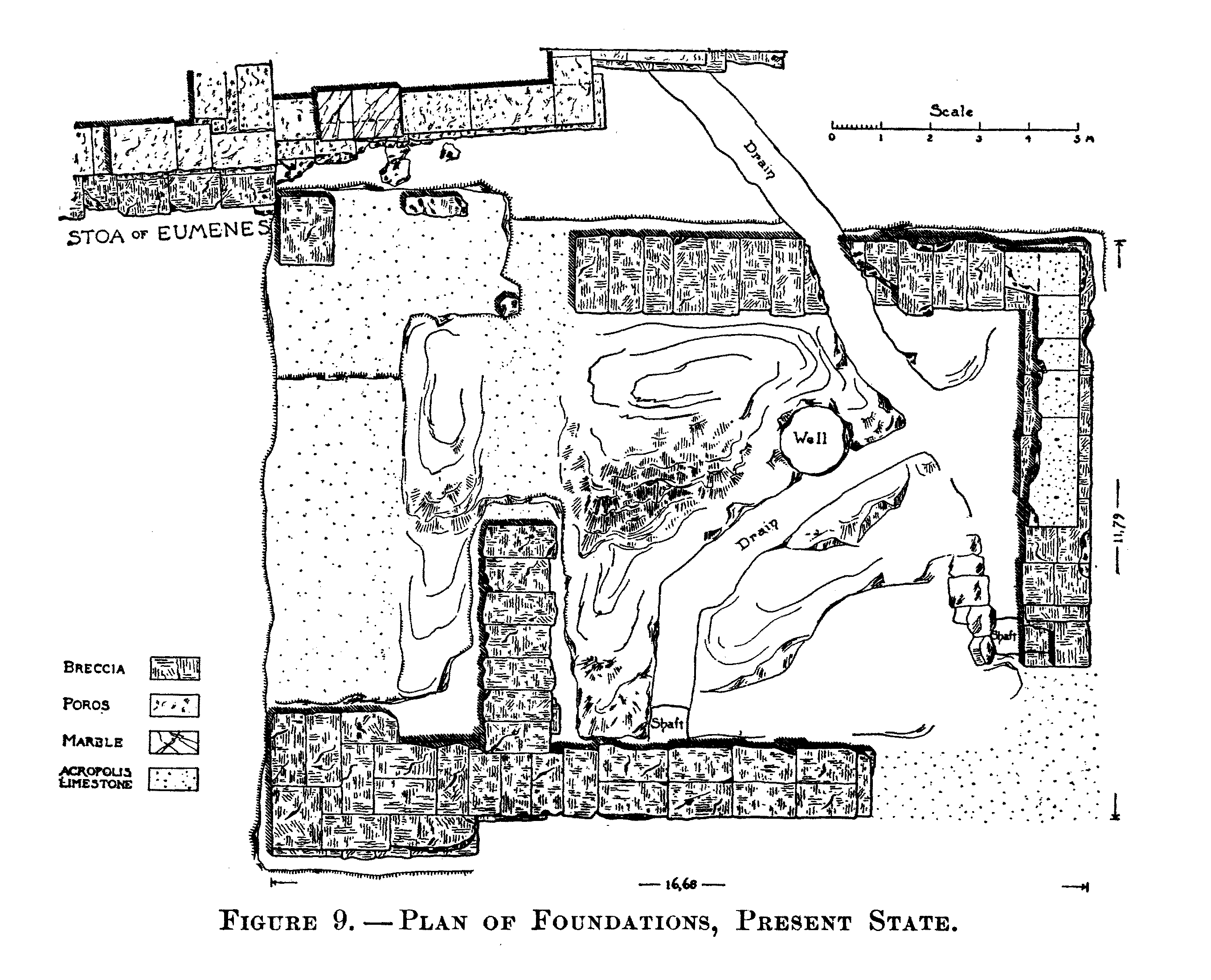
State plan of the foundations of the monument by William Dinsmoor

In 1889 Wilhelm Dörpfeld proposed a site in the area of the Odeon of Herodes Atticus for the foundations of the building, which idea was eventually discarded. This identification was then used as a terminus ante quem for the destruction of the choragic monument and the building of the Beulé Gate before the construction of the Odeon in the middle of the 2nd century. William Bell Dinsmoor finally identified the site in 1910.

Most of the surviving architectural remains of the choragic monument, notably its inscription, were later built into the central portion of the Beulé Gate, which was uncovered by Charles Ernest Beulé in 1852. These remains were first studied in 1885 by Dörpfeld.

The exact date of the destruction of the monument is unknown, however, Dinsmoor argued that it might have been at the same time as the demolition of the Stoa of Eumenes in the late Roman period, before the reconstruction by Phaidros of the Theatre of Dionysos in the 3rd or 4th century CE.

== Choragic monuments ==
Two of the major choragic monuments that have survived (Thrasyllos' and Nikias') belong to the period of oligarchic rule under the Macedonian regency, and it is perhaps significant that these are not on the Street of the Tripods, where most choragic prizes and monuments were placed. The conspicuous display of wealth and prestige they represent may have been an attempt to further the political careers of the choregoi and as such prompted the sumptuary law of Demetrios of Phaleron.

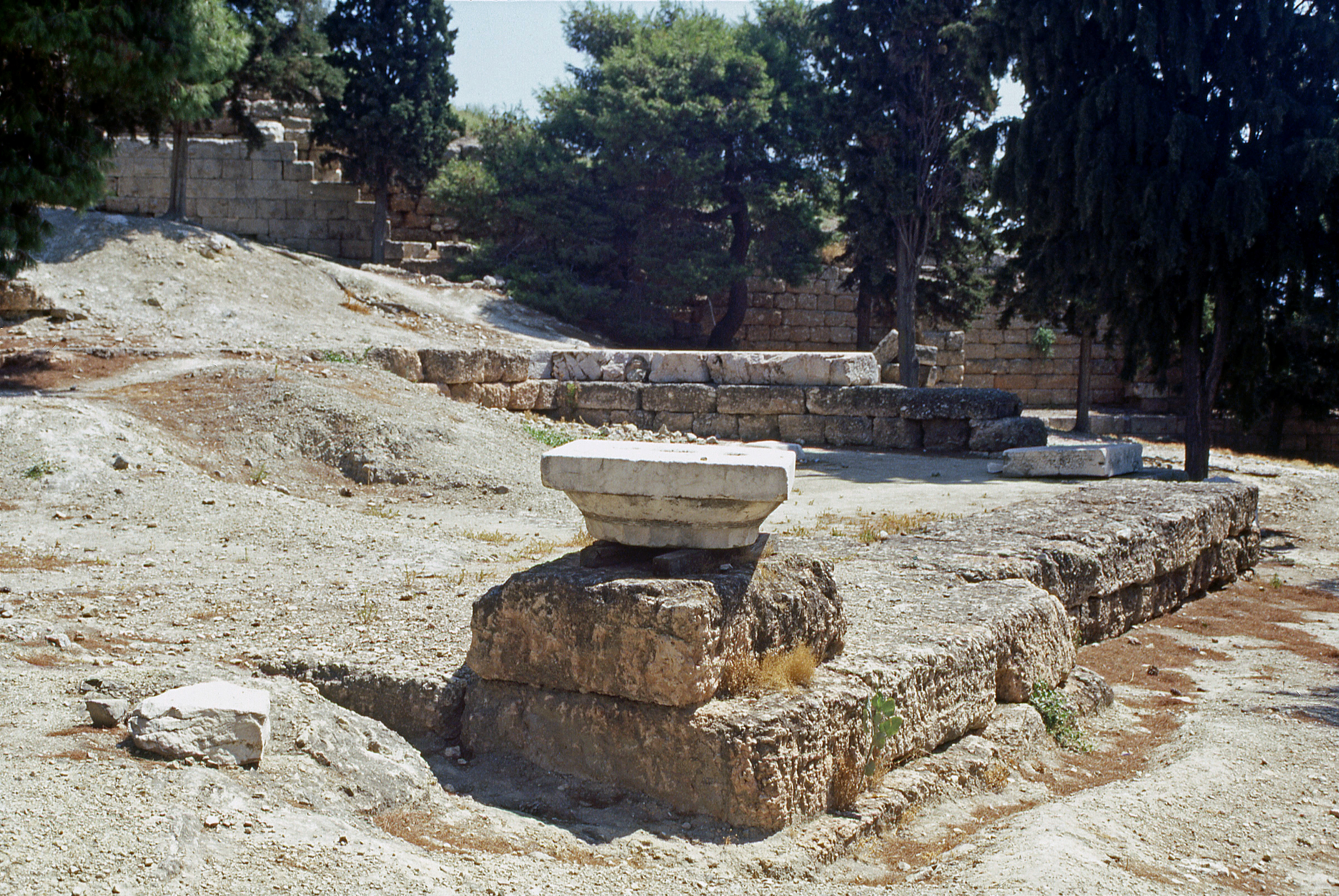
Foundations of the monument in 1998

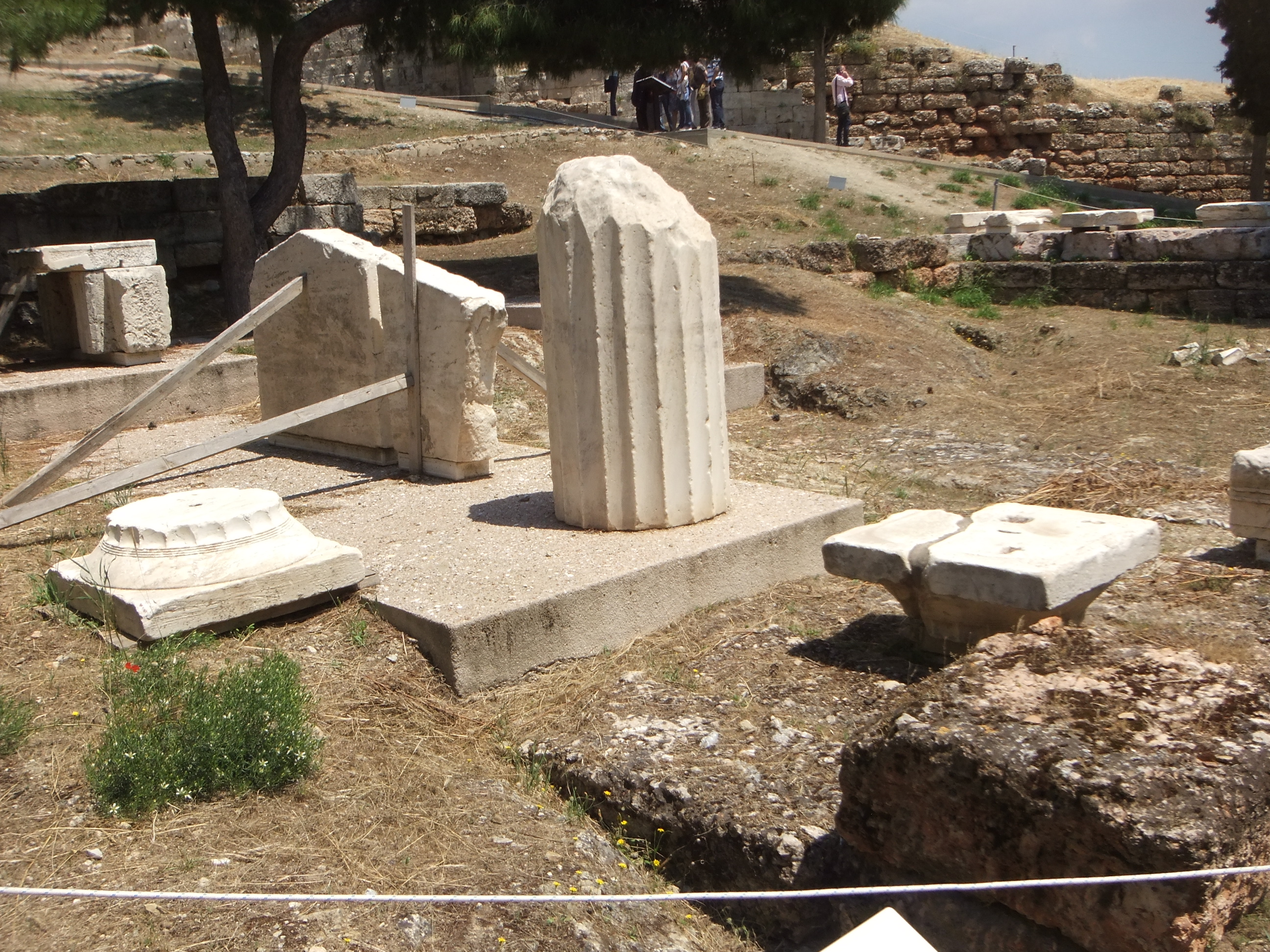
Architectural fragments of the monument at the original site

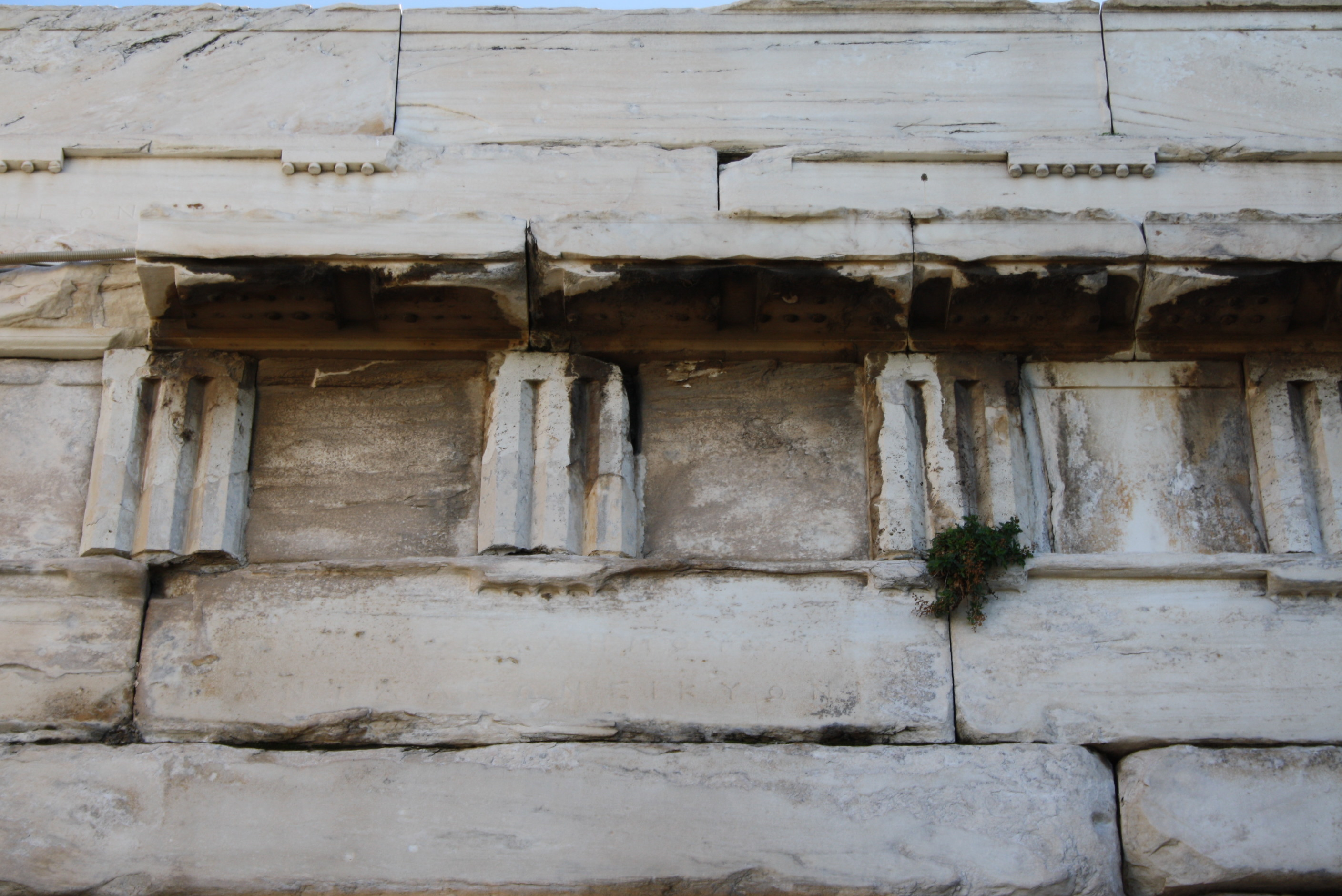
Entablature of the monument reused in the Beulé Gate
