= Choragic Monument of Thrasyllos =

Ancient monument in Athens

Coordinates: 37°58′16″N 23°43′39″E

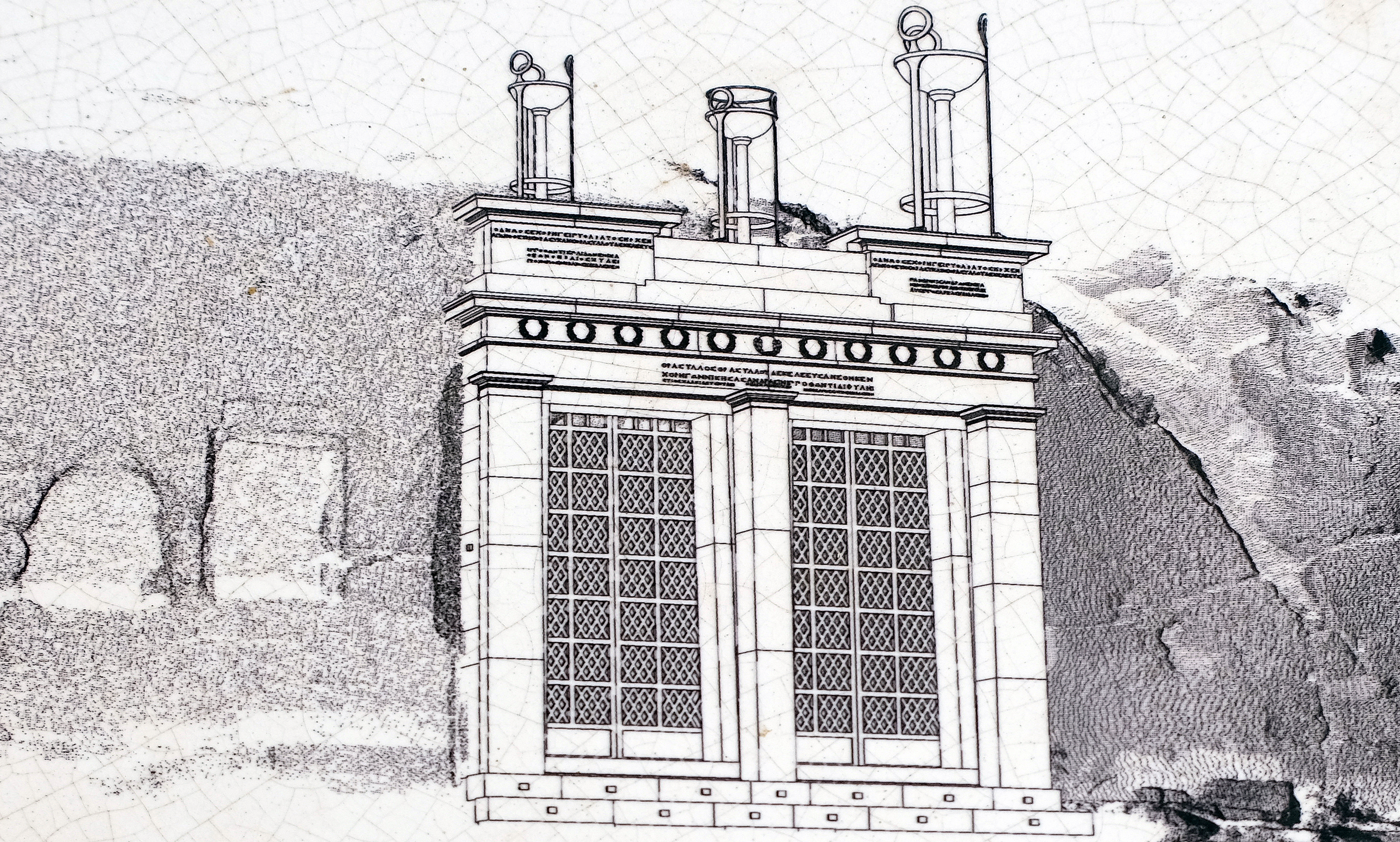
Reconstruction of the choragic monument of Thrasyllos as it might have appeared in the time of Thrasykles.

The Choragic Monument of Thrasyllos is a memorial building erected in 320–319 BCE on the artificial scarp of the south face of the Acropolis of Athens to commemorate the choregos, Thrasyllos. It is built in the form of a small temple and fills the opening of a large, natural cave. It was modified in 271–270 BCE by Thrasykles the son of Thrasyllos, agonothetes in the Great Dionysia Games. Pausanias refers to the monument indirectly, providing us with the information that in the cave there existed a representation of Apollo and Artemis slaughtering the children of Niobe.

Echoing the west part of the south wing of the Propylaea, the facade of the monument is formed by two monumental doorways with antae and a central pillar, door frames, architrave with continuous guttae, frieze and cornice. The frieze was decorated with ten olive wreaths, five on each side of a central wreath, while the cornice supported bases for the choragic tripods. It was built in a variety of marbles from local quarries. On the epistyle there was the inscription:

Thrasyllos, son of Thrasyllos of Dekeleia, set this up, being choregos and winning in the men's chorus for the tribe of Hippothontis. Euios of Chalkis played the flute. Neaichmos was archon. Karidamos son of Sotios directed.

— IG II^{3} 4, 468

Two subsequent inscriptions were added in the years 270–271 BCE, which read:

The demos was choregos. Pytharatos was archon. Thrasykles, son of Thrasyllos of Dekeleia, was agonothete. Hippothontis won the boys’ chorus. Theon the Theban played the flute. Pronomos the Theban directed.

The demos was choregos. Pytharatos was archon. Thrasykles, son of Thrasyllos of Dekeleia, was agonothete. Pandionis won the men's chorus. Nikokles of Ambracia played the flute. Lysippos the Arcadian directed

— IG II^{3} 4, 531

The structure would have been surmounted with three bronze tripods, prizes in the choregia. Stuart and Revett record a statue of Dionysos in place of the original tripods; this was likely a later addition at the time of the repair of the Theatre of Dionysos by Phaidros in the fourth century CE.

Sometime in the Christian period a church was installed in the cave dedicated to Panaghia Spiliotissa (Our Lady of the Cave). This church was in use up to the late 20th century. Lord Elgin removed the Hellenistic statue of Dionysos in 1802 as a part of the Elgin Marbles; thus the sculpture was spared when the monument was destroyed by an Ottoman bombardment during the siege of Athens in 1827. Although the monument was scheduled to be restored in the nineteenth century by the Athens Archaeological Society, some of the marble was recarved and reused on the Byzantine church of Soteira Lykodimou. Recent restoration work began in 2002 and draws largely on the measured drawing by Stuart and Revett undertaken in the eighteenth century. It was through the work of Stuart and Revett and J. D. Le Roy's Ruines des plus beaux monuments de la Grece (1758) that the Thrasyllos Monument would influence later architecture. Both Karl Friedrich Schinkel and Alexander Thomson adopted the post-and-lintel construction of the monument in their work.

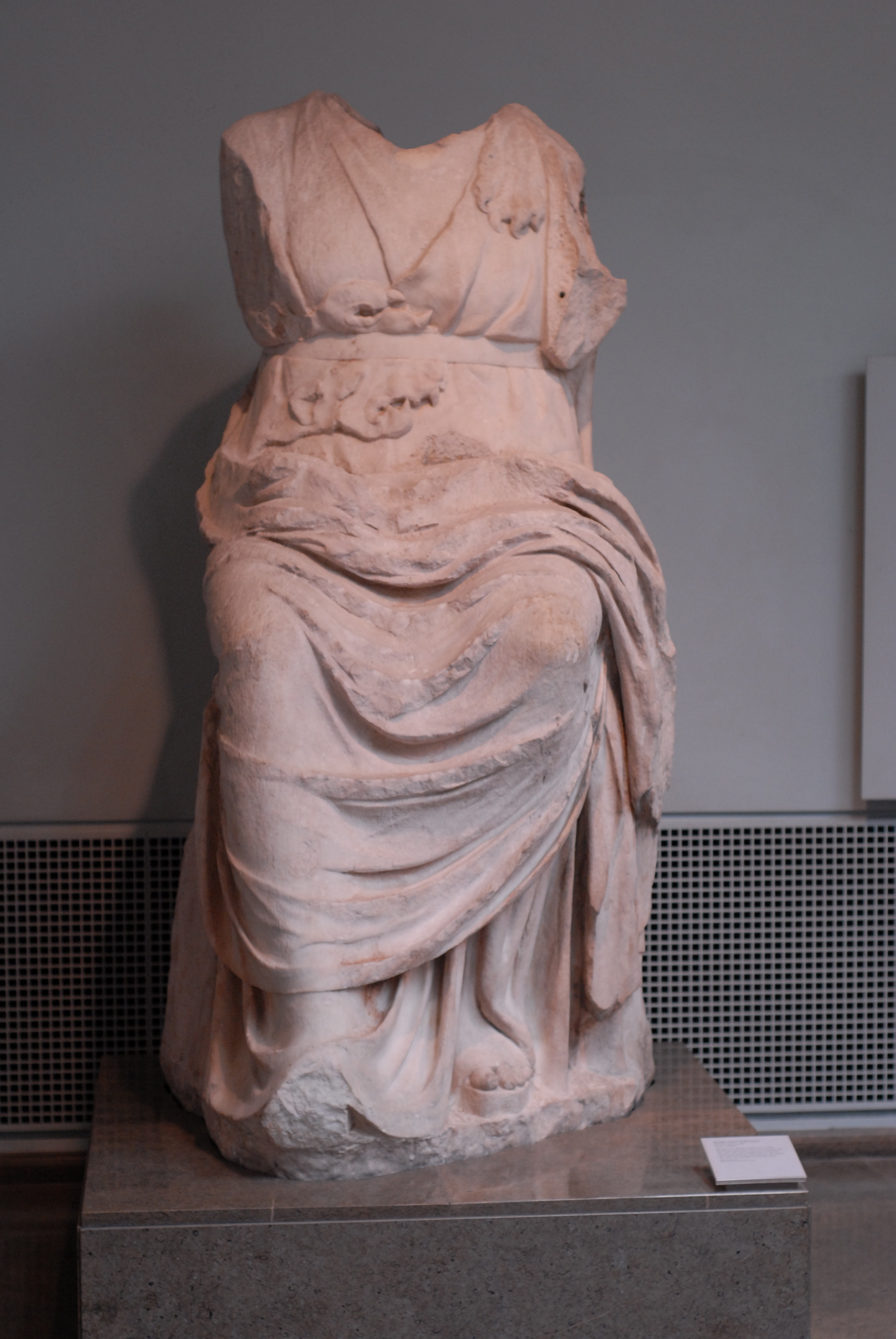
Later statue of Dionysos. British Museum.

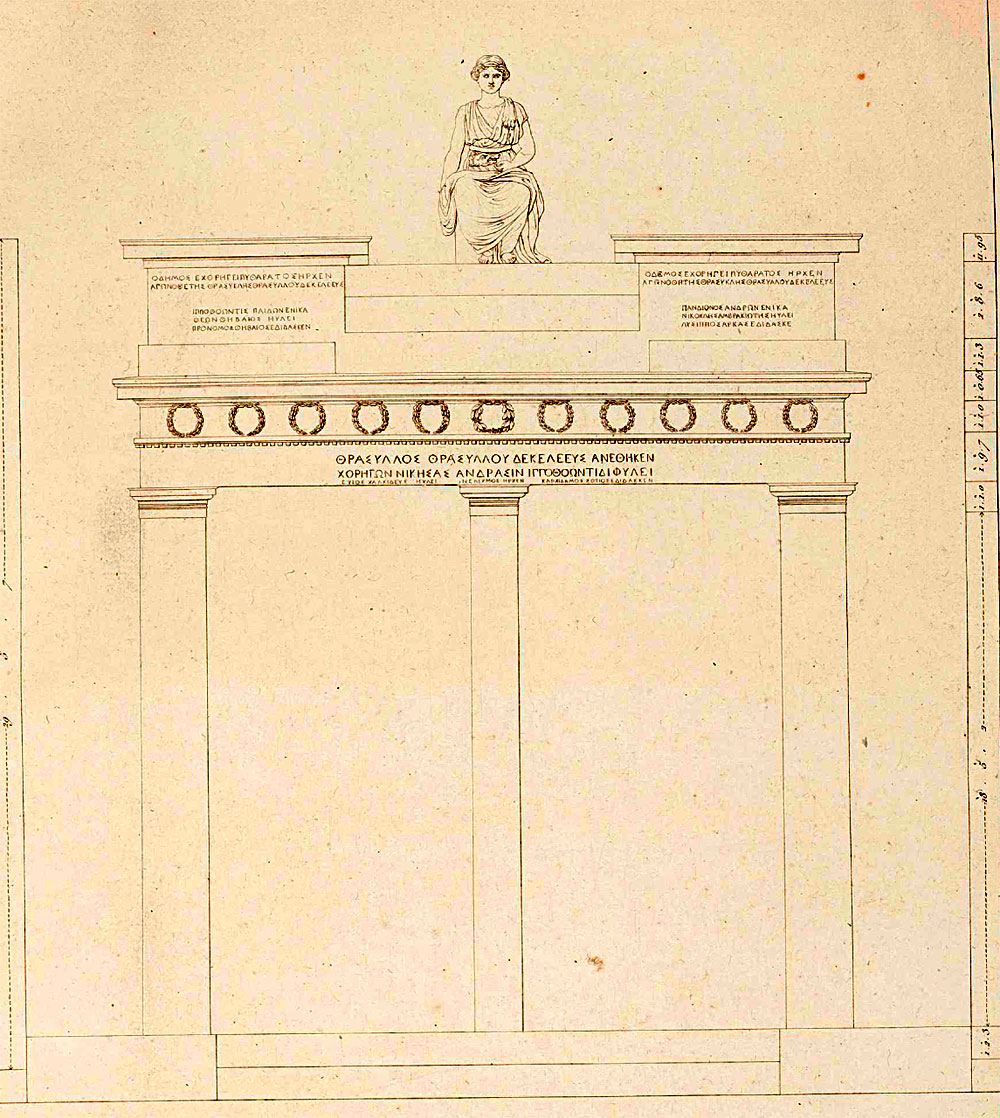
Stuart and Revett reconstruction.

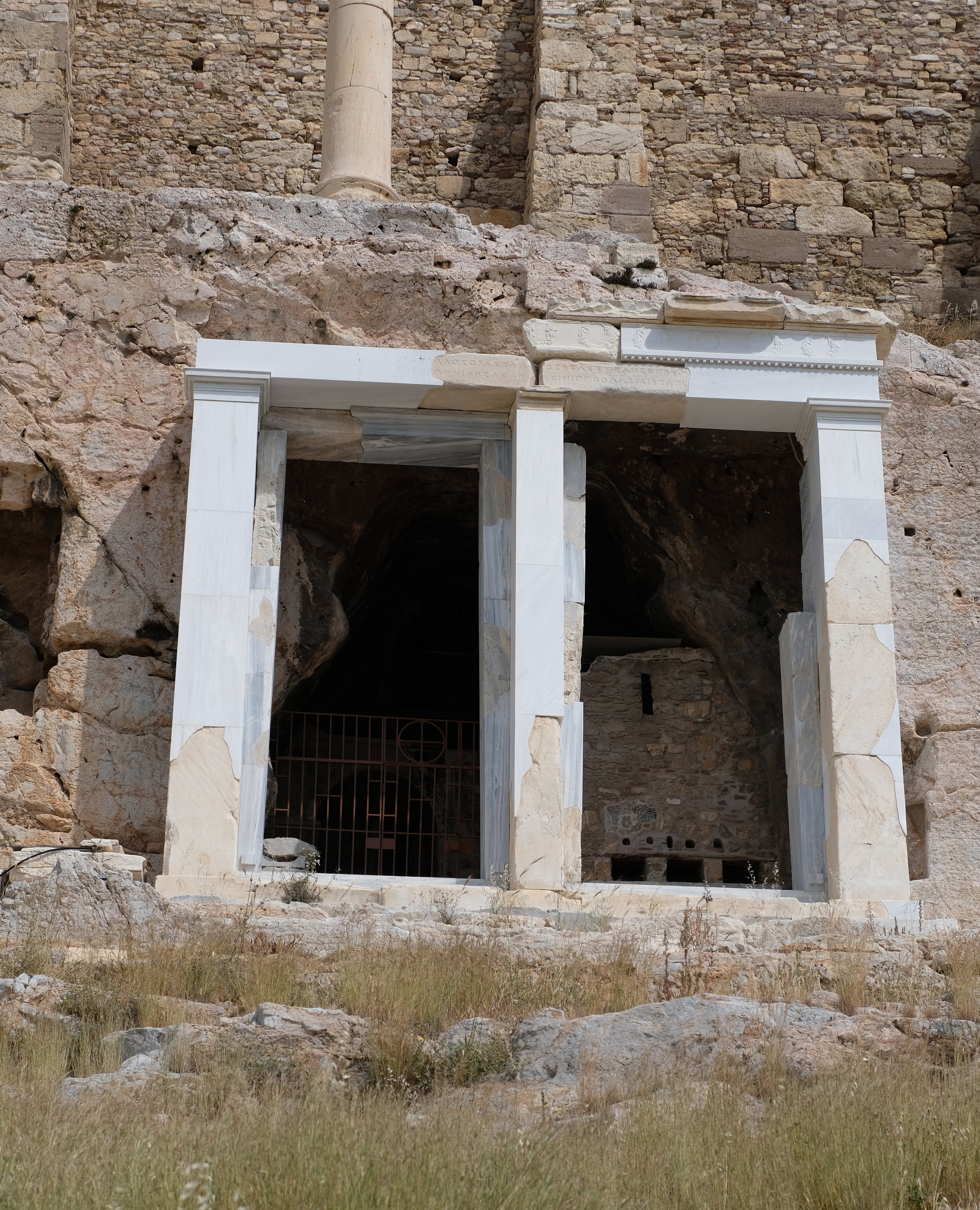
Current state of reconstruction work.

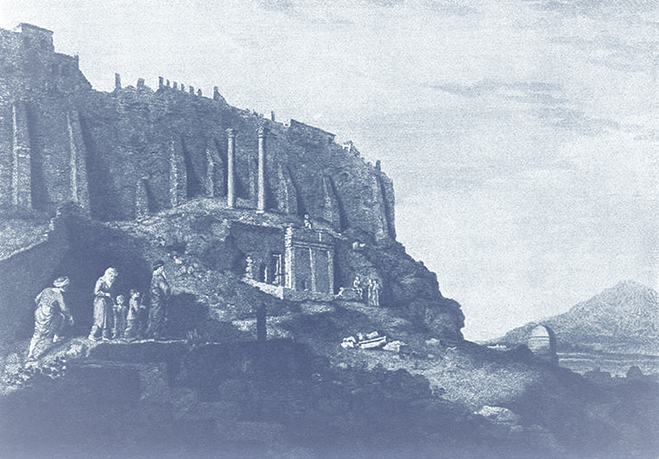
Etching of monument as it appeared in the 18th century.
