= Charles Ernest Beulé =

French archaeologist and politician (1826–1874)

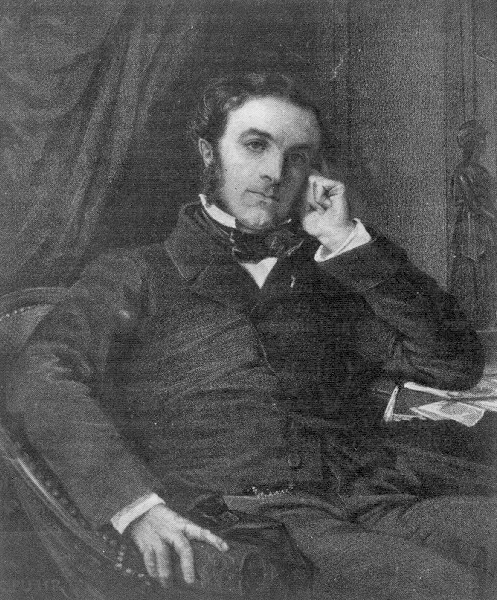
Charles Ernest Beulé

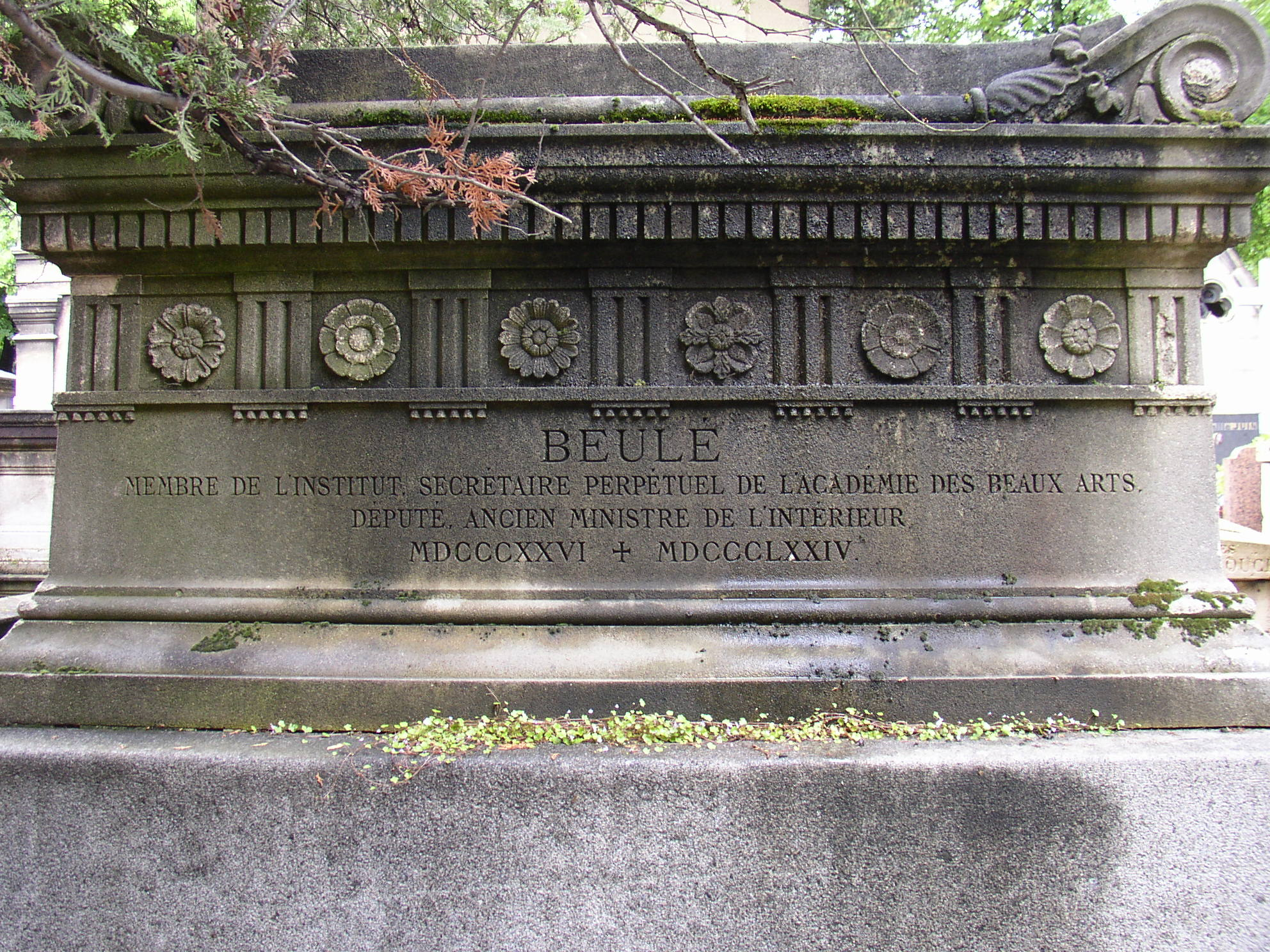
Beulé's grave at the Père Lachaise Cemetery in Paris

Charles Ernest Beulé (29 June 1826 – 4 April 1874) was a French archaeologist and politician.

== Biography ==
Born in Saumur, Maine-et-Loire, he was educated at the École Normale, and after holding the professorship of rhetoric at Moulins for a year, was sent to Athens in 1851 as one of the professors in the École Française.

While in Athens, he discovered the Beulé Gate leading to the propylaea of the acropolis, and his work, L'Acropole d'Athènes, was published by order of the minister of public instruction. On his return to France, promotion and distinctions followed rapidly upon his first successes. He was made a doctor of letters, chevalier of the Légion d'honneur, professor of archaeology at the Bibliothèque Impériale, member of the Académie des Inscriptions et Belles-Lettres, and perpetual secretary of the Académie des Beaux-Arts.

He took great interest in political affairs, with which the last few years of his life were entirely occupied. Elected a member of the National Assembly in 1871, he zealously supported the Orleanist party. Between May and November 1873, he was Minister of the Interior in the Broglie ministry.

He committed suicide on 4 April 1874, aged 47.

== Works ==
His other important works are: Études sur le Peloponnese (2nd edition 1875); Les Monnaies d'Athenes (published in 1858); L'Architecture au siècle de Pisistrate (published in 1860); and Fouilles à Carthage (published in 1861).

Beulé was also the author of high-class popular works on artistic and historical subjects: Histoire de l'art grec avant Pericles, the second edition of which was published in 1870, and Le Proces des Cesars published in four parts between 1867 and 1870.
