= Stoa of Eumenes =

Hellenistic colonnade at Acropolis of Athens

Coordinates: 37.9706°N 23.7260°E

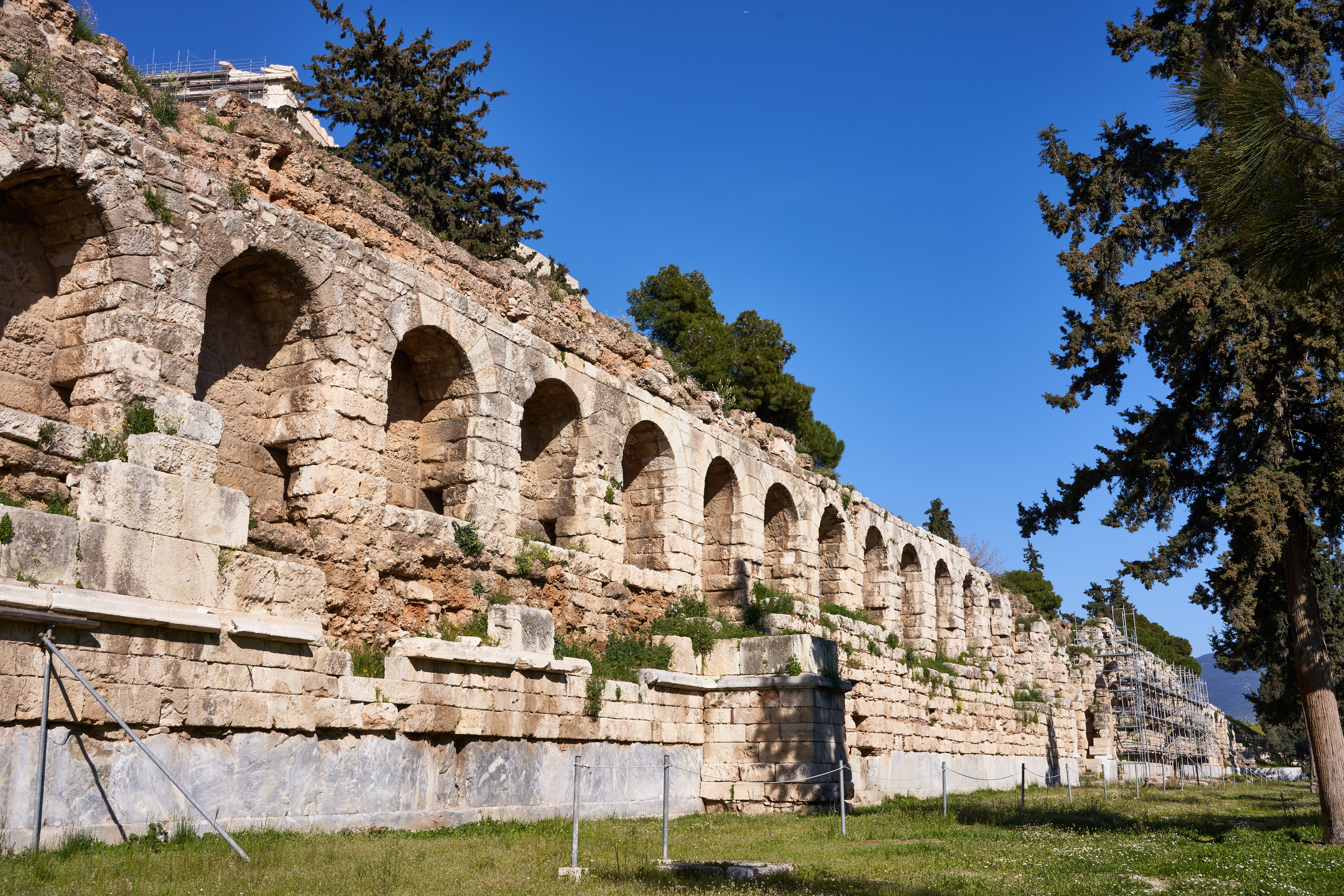
Remains of the north retaining wall of the Stoa of Eumenes.

The Stoa of Eumenes was a Hellenistic colonnade built on the South slope of the Acropolis, Athens and which lay between the Theater of Dionysus and the Odeon of Herodes Atticus The gallery was donated to the city of Athens by the king of Pergamon, Eumenes II (197–159 BC), around 160 BC. Vitruvius makes reference to the building when speaking about the purpose of stoai erected near theatres that served as a refuge for the spectators in inclement weather conditions or as stores for theatre props.

== History ==
The Stoa of Eumenes was constructed south of the Asklepieion staircase and the peripatos, on an artificial terrace of 9m x 13ms. To retain the pathway to the north an arched retaining wall was constructed along the northern edge of the site. Along this wall, the remains of which now dominate the site, the arcade was built. A substantial part of its northern wall, which is made from breccia and limestone and faced with Hymettian and Pentelic marble, is still preserved. Today, the ancient level of the stoa floor has been restored, with many of the pillars of the ground floor colonnade still in place. The foundations on which the arcade was built is located to the northwest of the Choragic Monument of Nikias and on the same level as the broad terrace in front of the stoa which is 32 m wide at its eastern end and 20 m west. To the south, it is bordered by a retaining wall, a considerable part of which has been preserved.

The arcade was two-storey, 163 m long and 17.65 m wide. The ground floor facade was formed by a colonnade with 64 Doric columns, while along the lengthwise axis of the building there was a second series of 32 columns of the Ionic order. On the upper storey, the exterior colonnade had the equivalent number of double-semicolumns of Ionic order and the interior columns had the rather rarer type of capitals, the Pergamene order. The two floors were connected externally by two stairs that formed at either end of the arcade. Viewers from the lower part of the theatre had access to the ground floor of the gallery through the western parodos The Stoa of Eumenes bears a great resemblance to the form of the Stoa of Attalos in the Ancient Agora of Athens erected by Eumenes' brother, Attalos II.

As a careful study of the fragmentary remains of the capitals and cornice showed that the building was for the most part made of a kind of island marble from which most of the buildings in Pergamon were built, while it is not found in other Athens buildings. Most of the architectural members of the arcade would likely have been built in Pergamon and shipped to Athens.

In the 2nd century AD, the western end of the Eumenes Stoa was connected to the Odeon of Herodes Atticus by a staircase at the eastern end of its interior. The gallery was in use until the 3rd century AD, when it was destroyed and its material used in the construction of the Valerian wall. In the middle of the 13th century, the northern retaining wall of the arcade was incorporated into the Rizokastro Wall built around the Acropolis rock.

The ruins of the Stoa of Eumenes were uncovered by the Archaeological Society of Athens in the years 1877–78.

== Bibliography ==
- Coulton, J. J. (1977). The Architectural Development of the Greek Stoa. Oxford.
- Dörpfeld, W. (1888). "Die Stoa De Eumenes In Athens". AthMitt.
- Lefantzis, M.; Jensen, J. (2006). "The Altar, the Peribolos of the Asklepieion and the Stoa of Eumenes at the south slope of the Athens Acropolis. New architectural facts and restoration proposals". Aspects of Ancient Greek Cult: Context - Ritual - Iconography. Denmark.
- Lefantzis, M.; Mpriana, M. (2005). "New research during the restoration of the Stoa of Eumenes the II". Anthemion, Centre of the Acropolis Studies. 13.
- Habicht, Christian (1990). "Athens and the Attalids in the Second Century B. C.". Hesperia: The Journal of the American School of Classical Studies at Athens. 59 (3): 561–577. doi:10.2307/148304. JSTOR 148304.
- Winter, Frederick E. (2006). Studies in Hellenistic Architecture. Toronto.
- Homer A. Thompson, Architecture as a Medium of Public Relations among the Successors of Alexander Studies in the History of Art, Vol. 10, Symposium Series I: Macedonia and Greece in Late Classical and Early Hellenistic Times (1982), pp. 172–189
- Stewart, Andrew (2004). Attalos, Athens, and the Akropolis: The Pergamene 'Little Barbarians' and their Roman and Renaissance Legacy. Cambridge.
- Travlos, J. (1971). The Pictorial Dictionary of ancient Athens. Thames and Hudson.
