= Thomas Henry Dyer =

19th-century English historian

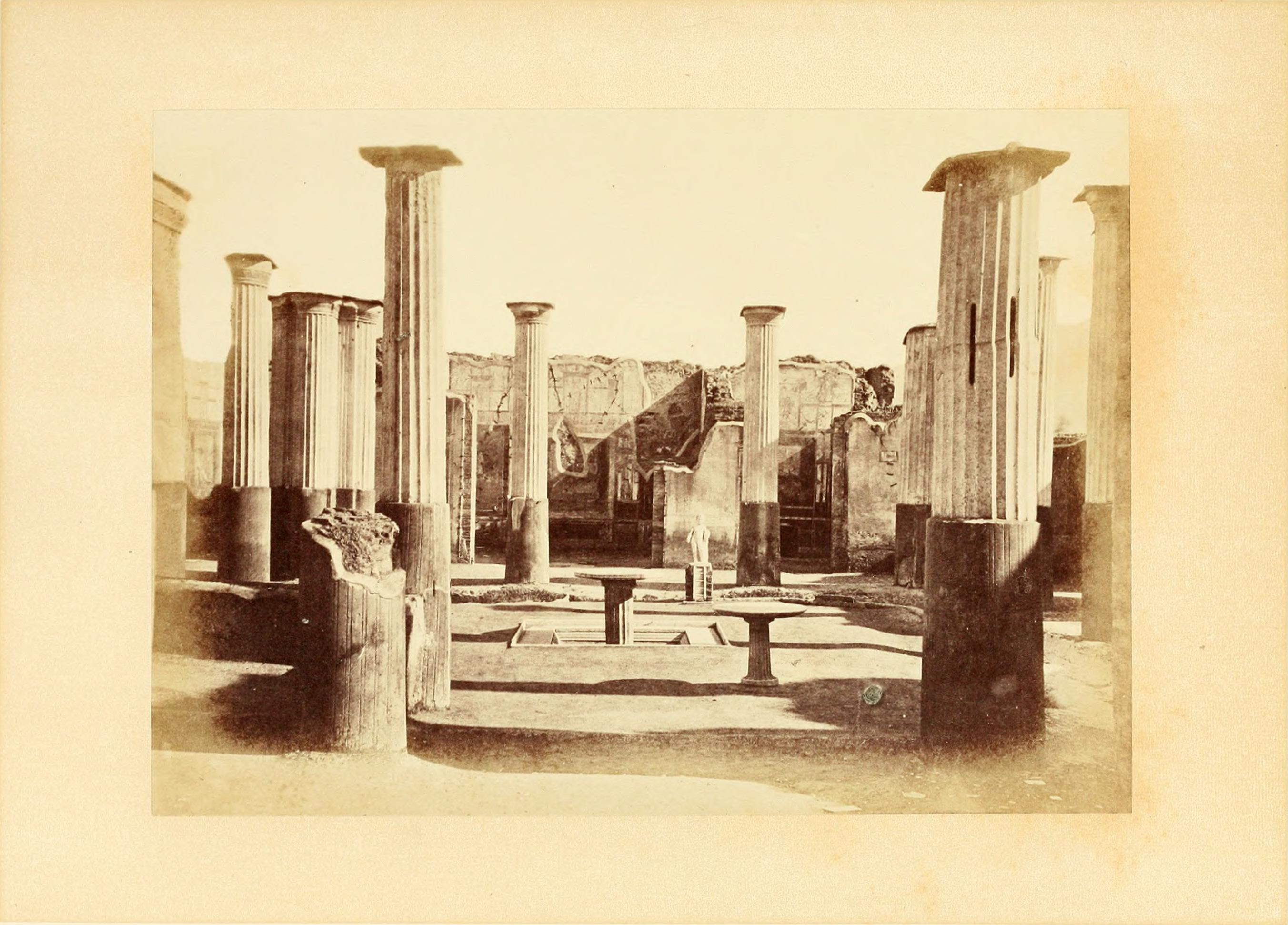
- The ruins of Pompeii, by Thomas Henry Dyer
- Born: 4 May 1804; London, England
- Died: 30 January 1888 (aged 83); Bath, England
- Occupation: Writer

Thomas Henry Dyer (4 May 1804 –30 January 1888) was an English historical and antiquarian writer.

== Life and career ==
Dyer was born in London on 4 May 1804. He was originally intended for a business career, and for some time acted as clerk in a West India house; but finding his services no longer required after the emancipation of the British West Indies, he decided to devote himself to literature.

In 1850 Dyer published the Life of Calvin. According to the Encyclopædia Britannica Eleventh Edition, it was "a conscientious and on the whole impartial work, though the character of Calvin is somewhat harshly drawn, and his influence in the religious world generally is insufficiently appreciated." Dyer's first historical work was the History of Modern Europe (1861–1864; 3rd ed. revised and continued to the end of the 19th century, by A. Hassall, 1901), which was considered "a meritorious compilation and storehouse of facts, but not very readable" by Britannica. Dyer next published History of the City of Rome (1865) and History of the Kings of Rome (1868), which was considered a "conservative" and somewhat old-fashioned history by critics (such as J. R. Seeley and the Saturday Review) who felt Dyer uncritically trusted classical sources such as Livy, and did not take into account contemporary scholarship. Roma Regalis (1872) and A Plea for Livy (1873) were written in reply to his critics.

Dyer frequently visited Greece and Italy, and wrote several "topographical" works which Britannica felt were his best. These books included Pompeii, its History, Buildings and Antiquities (1867, new ed. in Bohn's Illustrated Library) and Ancient Athens, its History, Topography and Remains (1873). Dyer's last publication was On Imitative Art (1882).

Dyer died in Bath, Somerset on 30 January 1888.
