= George Henry Chase =

American archaeologist (1874–1952)

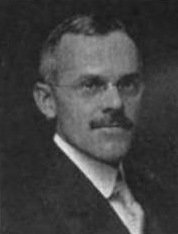
- Born: June 13, 1874; Lynn, Massachusetts
- Died: February 2, 1952 (aged 77); Cambridge, Massachusetts
- Burial place: Mount Auburn Cemetery
- Education: Harvard University
- Occupations: Archaeologist, educator

George Henry Chase (June 13, 1874 – February 2, 1952) was an American archaeologist and educator. From 1916 through 1945 he was the first John E. Hudson Professor of Archaeology at Harvard University.

== Biography ==
George Henry Chase was born in Lynn, Massachusetts on June 13, 1874. He graduated from Harvard University in 1896.

Chase was the principal excavator at the Argive Heraeum. He was elected to the American Academy of Arts and Sciences in 1912 and the American Philosophical Society in 1929.

He died in Cambridge, Massachusetts on February 2, 1952, and was buried at Mount Auburn Cemetery.
