= Agonothetes =

Ancient Greek title, elected president of sacred games

In ancient Greece, an agonothetes (Ancient Greek: ἀγωνοθέτης, plural agonothetae; ἀγωνοθέται) were the persons who decided the disputes and awarded the prizes in the Panhellenic Games. Alternative names for the same role included athlothĕtae (ἀθλοθέται), particularly in Athens.

At first the person who instituted the games and defrayed the expenses was the agonothetes; but in the great public games, such as the Olympic Games and Pythian Games, these presidents were the representatives of different states, or were chosen from the people in whose country the games were celebrated; thus at the Panathenaic Games at Athens ten athlothetae were elected for four years to superintend the various contests.

In English, by confusion with the native -s plural form, the singular agonothete and plural agonothetes are sometimes encountered.

== Bibliography ==
- Begass, Christoph (2024). "’Großzügig’, ‘gerecht’ und ‘vielfach geehrt’? Zur Selbstdarstellung der Agonotheten in Hellenismus und Kaiserzeit" [‘Generous’, ‘just’ and ‘often honoured’? On the self-presentation of agonothetes in the Hellenistic and Imperial periods]. In: Begass, Christoph; Mann, Christian; Tentori Montalto, Marco (eds.). Money and honor in ancient athletics. Stuttgart: Steiner, ISBN 978-3-515-13634-1.
- Begass, Christoph (2025). Zwischen Stadt und Stadion. Die Agonothesie der griechisch-römischen Welt in Hellenismus und Kaiserzeit [Between city and stadium. The agonothesia of the Greco-Roman world in the Hellenistic and Imperial periods]. Heidelberger Althistorische Beiträge und Epigraphische Studien, vol. 68. Stuttgart: Steiner, ISBN 978-3-515-13848-2.
- Sarrazanas, Clément (2021). La cité des spectacles permanents: organisation et organisateurs des concours civiques dans l'Athènes hellénistique et impériale [The city of permanent spectacles: organisation and organisers of civic competitions in Hellenistic and Imperial Athens]. 2 vol., Bordeaux: Ausonius Editions, ISBN 9782356133977.
