= Choregos =

Ancient Greek theater patron

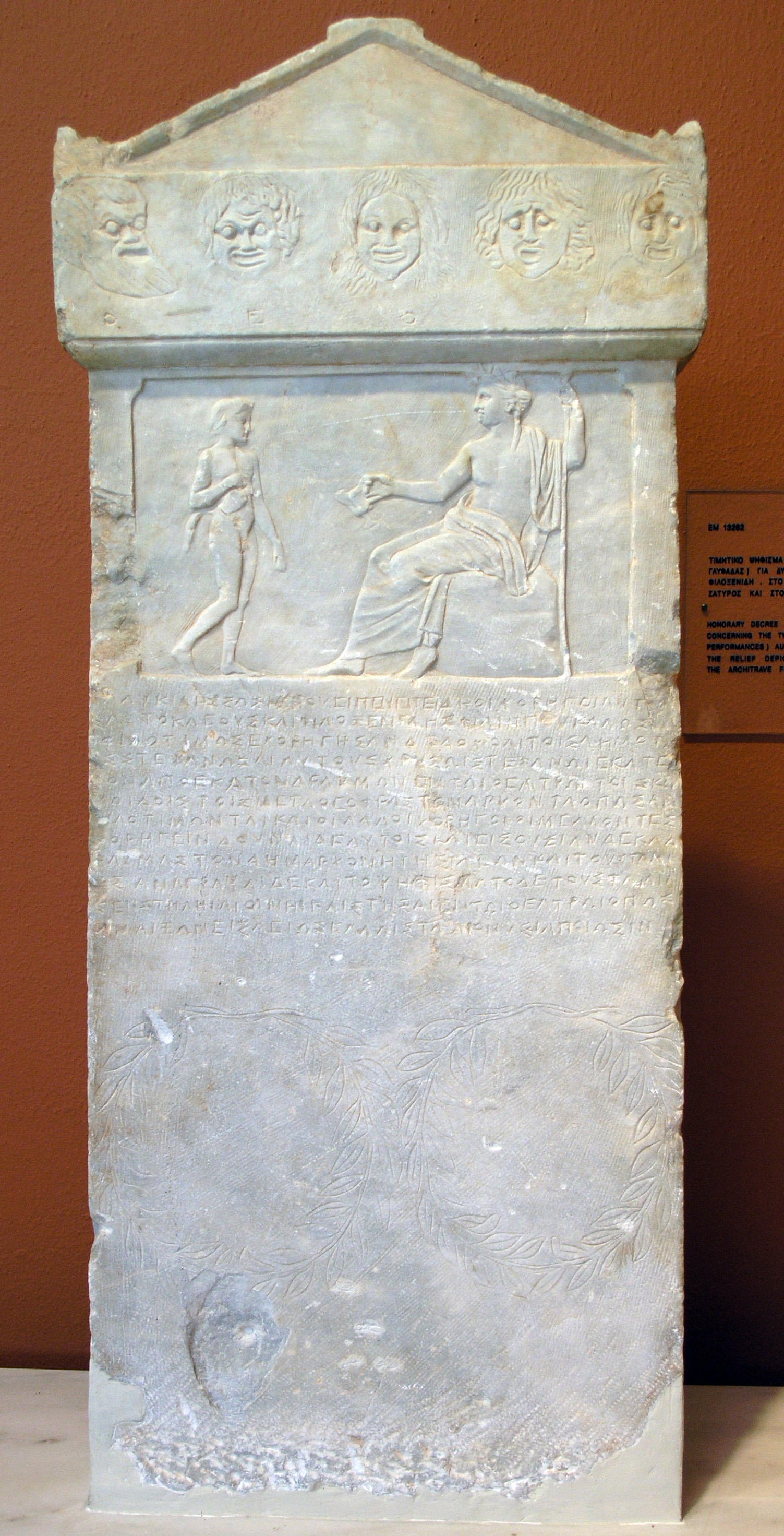
Relief of seated Dionysus and satyr; inscription beneath is a decree by the deme Aixone honoring the choregoi Auteas and Philoxenides (313–312 BC)

In the theatre of ancient Greece, the choregos (pl. choregoi; Greek: χορηγός, Greek etymology: χορός "chorus" + ἡγεῖσθαι "to lead") (Note: The Attic and Doric form was "χοραγός" (choragos) rather than the more usual Greek form "χορηγός" (choregos). The later forms of the word in Latin (choragus) and Italian (corago) followed the Attic spelling.) was a wealthy Athenian citizen who assumed the public duty, or choregiai, of financing the preparation for the chorus and other aspects of dramatic production that were not paid for by the government of the polis or city-state. Modern Anglicized forms of the word include choragus and choregus, with the accepted plurals being the Latin forms choregi and choragi. In Modern Greek, the word χορηγός is synonymous with the word "grantor".

Choregoi were appointed by the archon and the tribes of Athenian citizens from among the Athenian citizens of great wealth. Service as a choregos, though an honor, was a duty for wealthy citizens and was part of the liturgical system designed to improve the city-state's economic stability through the use of private wealth to fund public good. Choregoi paid for costumes, rehearsals, expenses of the chorus (including training, salaries, board and lodging), scenery, props (including elaborate masks), special effects and most of the musicians. The choregos also hosted a feast if his chorus proved victorious in competition. The prizes for drama at the Athenian festival competitions were awarded jointly to the playwright and the choregos. Such victories carried prestige for the choregos. Several notable political figures served as choregoi, including Themistocles, Pericles and Plato, among others. Monuments were built in honor of victorious choregoi.

At the turn of the 17th century AD, in an attempt to recreate the ancient Greek dramatic tradition, the position was revived briefly in Italian opera, and combined the roles of impresario and director.

== Nomination and appointment ==
Under the Athenian constitution, choregoi were appointed by the archon and the tribes of Athenian citizens. The archon appointed choregoi for the tragedies, while the tribes supplied five choregoi for the comedies as well as choregoi for the Dionysia and Thargelia (the major festival competitions). The archon, who began this process months in advance of a festival, were able easily to identify potential dramatic choregoi because their mutual wealth allowed them to move in the same social circles as the most qualified candidates. In order to be considered for the role of choregos, an individual had to be an Athenian citizen and possess great wealth. Choregoi for choruses of boys were required by Athenian law to be over forty years old to protect the young participants. Volunteers from this selected group of qualified individuals may have been the source of most appointments. The figure of the choregos can be traced back as early as the 7th century B.C. References to the title are found in recovered portions of the earliest choral lyric poetry, including the Parthenia (or "Maiden-songs") of Alkman, a poet of archaic Sparta.

Service as a choregos, though an honor, was a duty rather than a choice for wealthy citizens. This duty was one among many built into the state liturgical system of ancient Athens, which was designed to improve the city-state's economic stability through the use of private wealth to fund public good. Once nominated, however, a potential choregos had three choices. He could accept the nomination and the duty. Through a process called skepsis, he could claim one of several specifically defined exemptions and be excused from service. Finally, he could identify another Athenian who was more qualified to perform the role of choregos and use the procedure of skepsis to resolve the matter.

== Duties of the choregoi ==
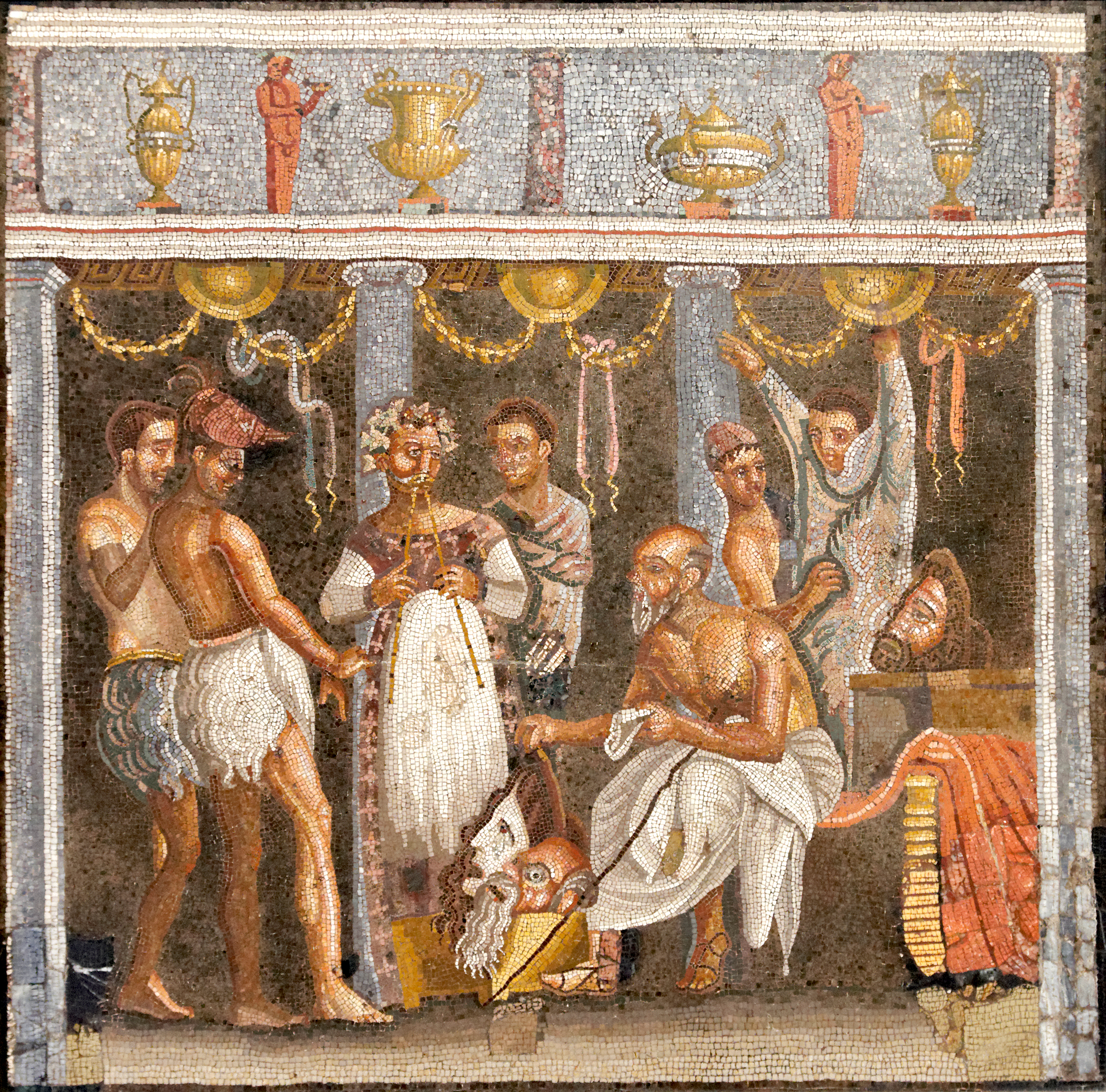
A choregos sits, surrounded by actors and a musician playing tibiae.

Choregoi were responsible for supporting many aspects of theatre production in ancient Athens: paying for costumes, rehearsals, the chorus, scenery or scene painting (including such items as mechane and ekkyklema), props (including elaborate masks), special effects, such as sound, and musicians, except that the state provided the flute player and paid the actors not in the chorus. At the City Dionysia in Athens, for example, the choregos was expected to finance all aspects relating to the chorus, which could include training, the hiring of an expert to execute such training, salaries, and board and lodging during a lengthy rehearsal period.

The choregos did not act as the director for the production; this role was fulfilled by the playwright. The choregos would appoint a chorodidaskalos (Χοροδιδάσκαλος, often shortened to διδάσκαλος), often the playwright, to train the chorus. The choregos was often expected to host a feast, analogous to a modern cast party, should his chorus prove victorious in competition. According to the Oxford Dictionary of the Classical World: "The sums spent on choregiai show that the duty could elicit vast expenditure. One extremely enthusiastic choregos catalogues a list which represents an outlay of nearly two and a half talents. This includes a dithyrambic choregia at the Little Panathenaea for 300 drachmae, and a tragic choregia for 3,000 dr. The latter figure is roughly ten times what a skilled worker might have earned annually." The reorganization of the choregia in 406 BC spread the cost among the wider community – the synchoregia – with the choregos paying only part of the expense.

The word choregoi was also applied to men who performed certain cultic duties regulating the choruses of women in ritual contexts, such as with the cult of Auxesia.

== Prizes and recognition ==
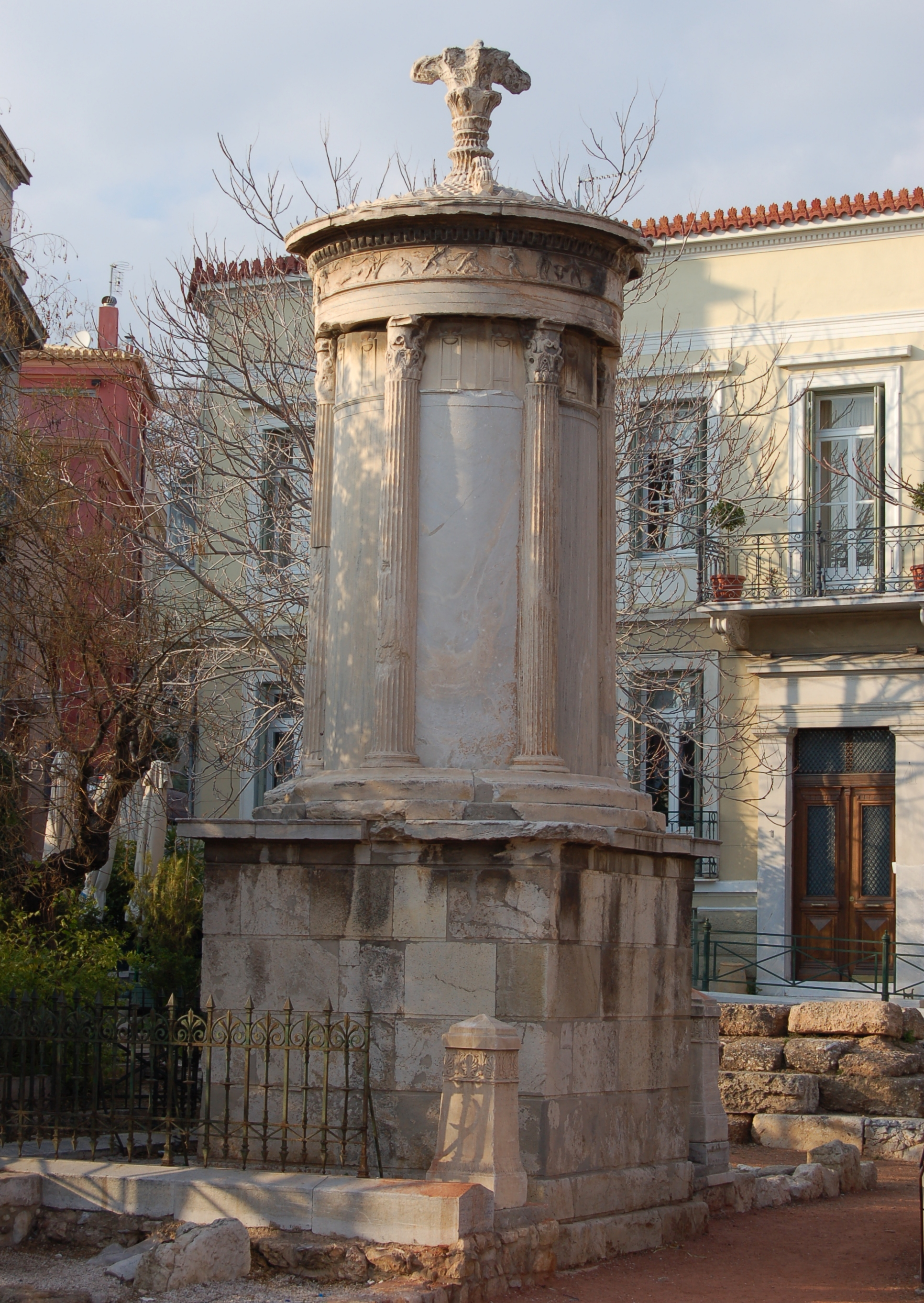
Choragic Monument of Lysicrates near the Acropolis in Athens, Greece

The prizes for drama at the Dionysia were awarded jointly to the playwright and the choregos. Originally the choregos acted on behalf of his tribe, which collectively won the kudos for a successful performance. Gradually the sponsoring choregoi asserted more personal responsibility, and by the fourth century BC the prize for the choregos was a personal award. The winner was expected to display his trophy in a place of honor. Such victories carried prestige for the choregos, and these honors could be an important stepping stone to a successful political career for wealthy young Athenians. Conversely, failure to successfully execute one's role as a choregos could lead to social humiliation.

Victorious choregoi were honored further with the erection of a monument in honor of their accomplishment. These monuments, which have become an important source of scholarly knowledge about the choregoi, were the final step in the victory celebration, which also involved a parade and a feast. Each monument featured an eloquent inscription that echoed the original victory announcement made at the Dionysia.

== Notable choregoi ==
Greek society was a symbiosis of art and politics, and several notable political figures of the time served as choregoi. Themistocles was choregos for Phrynichus' Phoenissae (named for the Phoenician women who formed the chorus), and Pericles acted as choregos for The Persians by Aeschylus. In 365 BC, Plato, a rare exception to the qualification of wealth, served as choregos for a boys chorus supported by the patronage of Dionysius II of Syracuse. Choregos Lysicrates is remembered today because of the monument still standing in Athens erected in honor of the festival victory of his production in 335 BC. Ruins of a choragic monument to Nicias from the 5th-century BC were discovered in Athens in 1852.

== Philanthropic context ==
Choregoi were an example of a larger tradition of cosmopolitanism, defined by an interest in benefiting others, that dominated many aspects of urban life for the wealthy in ancient Greece and which has been linked to Western philanthropy. Many of these acts, which also included subsidy of temples, armories, and other essential municipal needs, were driven more by personal vanity, societal pressure, and political influence than the modern philanthropic impulse. Nevertheless, the choregoi's contributions to the theatre of ancient Greece were integral to the flourishing of drama in ancient Greece and the structure of the society's cultural landscape. One of the earliest references to the philanthropic impulse can be traced to Aeschylus's Prometheus Bound with the use of the word philanthropia, which translates to "love of humankind," displaying an early tie between the theatre and the choregoi, and philanthropy.

== 17th-century revival ==
At the turn of the 17th century AD, when the first operas were being written in an attempt to recreate the old Greek dramatic tradition, the position of choregos was revived briefly. It was known in Italian as "corago", and combined the roles of impresario and director.

In 1626, the position of an assistant professor of music at the University of Oxford was named choragus by its founder, William Heather, and the title has continued.

== Notes and references ==
Notes

== Sources ==
- Aristotle (1984). P J Rhodes (ed.). The Athenian Constitution. Harmondsworth, Middlesex, UK; New York: Penguin. ISBN 0140444319.
- Brockett, Oscar G; Hildy, Franklin J (2003). History of the Theatre (Foundation ed.). Boston: Allyn and Bacon. ISBN 0-205-47360-1.
- Liddell, Henry; Robert Scott (1888). A Greek-English Lexicon. New York: Harper and Brothers. OCLC 79840762.
- Pring, J T (1982). Oxford Dictionary of Modern Greek. Oxford: Clarendon Press. ISBN 0198641370.
- Wilson, Peter (2000). The Athenian Institution of the Khoregia: The Chorus, The City and The Stage. Cambridge, UK: Cambridge University Press. ISBN 0521542138.
- Zelenak, Michael (1998). Gender and Politics in Greek Tragedy. New York: Peter Lang Publishing. ISBN 0820440604.
