= Alison Frantz =

American archaeologist (1903–1995)

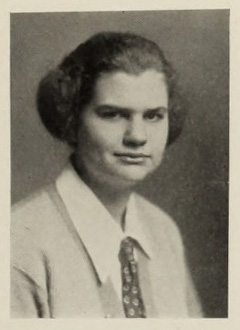
- Frantz, photographed in 1924 for her Smith College yearbook
- Born: Mary Alison Frantz; September 27, 1903; Duluth, Minnesota, US
- Died: February 1, 1995 (aged 91); New Brunswick, New Jersey, US
- Known for: Photography of archaeological sites and artifacts, particularly in the Athenian Agora

Academic background
- Education: Smith College; Columbia University
- Thesis: Byzantine Illuminated Ornament: A Study in Chronology (1937)
- Doctoral advisor: Charles Rufus Morey
- Espionage activity
- Allegiance: United States
- Agency: Office of Strategic Services
- Service years: 1942–1945

Mary Alison Frantz (September 27, 1903 – February 1, 1995) was an American archaeological photographer and Byzantinist. She was the official photographer of the excavations of the Agora of Athens, and a prolific photographer of ancient Greek sculpture, including the Parthenon Frieze and works from the Temple of Zeus, Olympia.

Frantz was born in Minnesota. Following her father's death early in her childhood, she lived briefly in Scotland, where she first took an interest in photography. She studied classics at Smith College in Massachusetts, graduating in 1924. She first visited Greece in 1925 and held a fellowship at the American School of Classical Studies at Athens (ASCSA) in 1929–1930. She carried out her doctoral research under Charles Rufus Morey, receiving her PhD from Columbia University in 1937. Frantz began working at the ASCSA's Agora excavations in January 1934. From 1935, she took on an increasing share of the excavation's photography, and was made its official photographer in 1939. She also took the first photographs of the Linear B tablets from the Mycenaean site of Pylos, images used for the first transcription of the tablets and consequently for the decipherment of Linear B. As part of her work in the Agora excavations, she excavated and restored the Church of the Holy Apostles, the site's last surviving Byzantine structure.

During the Second World War, Frantz joined the Office of Strategic Services (OSS). She worked as an assistant to Carl Blegen, another archaeologist turned agent, and gathered intelligence on European exiles in the United States. She served on an Allied commission to observe the Greek elections of 1946, worked for the US Information Service, and was subsequently the cultural attaché of the US embassy in Athens. In this capacity, she established the Fulbright Program in Greece.

Frantz left the Agora excavations in 1964. Her later work largely consisted of collaborations with archaeologists such as Gisela Richter, Martin Robertson, and Bernard Ashmole. Her publications included some of the earliest archaeological research into Ottoman Greece, as well as photography of archaic kore sculptures, Byzantine architecture, and artifacts from the Aegean Bronze Age. Her work on late antiquity and later periods is considered pioneering, and to have contributed to raising the scholarly standing of post-classical archaeology in Greece. She was considered among the foremost photographers of ancient Greek antiquities, and her work has been cited as a major influence on the scholarship and popular reception of classical Greece.

== Early life and education ==
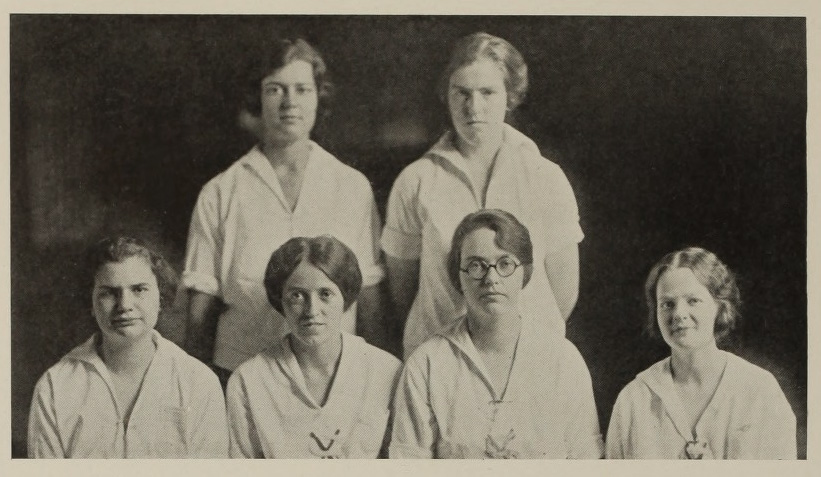
Frantz (front left) in 1924, as part of the Smith College field hockey team

Mary Alison Frantz was born on September 27, 1903, in Duluth, Minnesota, the youngest of five children. Her father, the newspaper publisher Alfred J. Frantz, died of pneumonia in 1905; (Note: McCredie 2000, p. 213. For the date and Alfred Frantz's name, see "Obituary: Mrs. Alfred J. Frantz". The New York Times. February 4, 1949.) her Scottish mother, Mary Kate Frantz, moved the family to Edinburgh, (Note: Szegedy-Maszak 1995, p. 62. For the name of Frantz's mother, see Vogeikoff-Brogan 2019.) where she educated Frantz at home. Frantz received her first camera while in Edinburgh, as a gift from her brother. She later described the experience, at the age of five, of watching her brother develop photographs in a darkroom as an early catalyst of her interest in the subject. After two years, the family returned to the United States. Her mother settled the family in Princeton: Frantz later credited this decision to the proximity of Princeton University, though she said that this was intended "for [her] brothers, of course".

Frantz was educated at Smith College, a women's liberal arts school in Massachusetts, where she was a forward on the field hockey team and a member of both the Greek and the Latin clubs. She graduated with a Bachelor of Arts degree in classics in 1924. Among her teachers at Smith was the art historian Clarence Kennedy, whose use of photography to record ancient and renaissance sculpture, aiming to minimize personal style in favor of documentary accuracy, influenced Frantz's later work. She subsequently spent the 1924–1925 academic year as a fellow of the American Academy in Rome. During this time, she made her first visit to Greece, on a short trip organized by the academy's director, Gorham P. Stevens, and his Greek wife, Annette Notaras. Frantz did not enjoy the visit, which lasted just over a month between April and May 1925; she wrote her mother that "Rome [was] far superior to Athens, except for the Acropolis".

Between 1927 and 1929, Frantz worked at Princeton University for the historian Charles Rufus Morey, researching for his Index of Christian Art. She returned briefly to Greece in the fall of 1927, visiting Priscilla Capps at her home in Athens. Capps was a fellow Smith College graduate and the daughter of Edward Capps, the chair of the managing committee of the American School of Classical Studies at Athens (ASCSA). (Note: Vogeikoff-Brogan 2019. For Edward Capps, see Vogeikoff-Brogan & Davis 2015, p. 5.) She and Frantz traveled to Meteora in northern Greece, which Frantz described in a letter as "the most amazing place [she had] ever seen". Frantz carried out her doctoral studies into Byzantine art with Morey, a prolific supervisor of Byzantine scholars and conduit for the movement of junior scholars between Princeton and the ASCSA. As Princeton did not accept women as students, Frantz's PhD was awarded, in 1937, by Columbia University. She sarcastically referred to the Byzantine period (in Athens, c. 900 – 1204), then out of scholarly fashion, as "the grubby period". (Note: Rotroff & Lamberton 2005, p. 51. On the dates of Byzantine Athens, see Bouras 2018, p. 1.)

Frantz spent the 1929–1930 academic year working as a librarian at the ASCSA, during which she took her first photographs of ancient Greek monuments. She lived in a room, secured for her by Priscilla Capps, at Miramare Palace hotel in Old Phaleron. She visited Thessaloniki in 1930, where she was given a tour of the Basilica of Saint Dimitrios, a Byzantine church dating to the seventh century CE, by Aristotelis Zachos, the architect who had restored the basilica after its destruction by fire in 1917.

== Early career ==
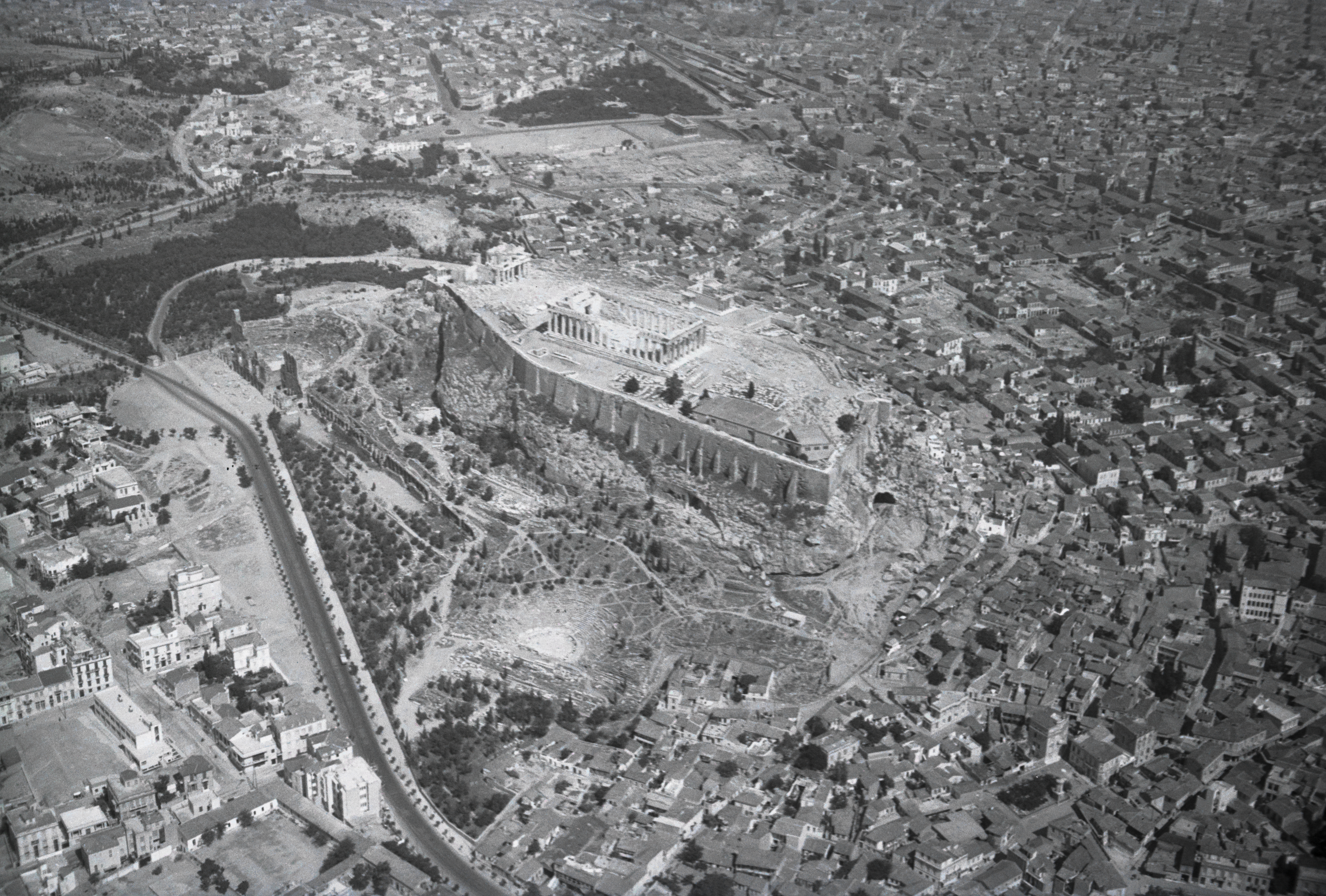
Aerial photograph of Athens taken in 1934, the year Frantz joined the Agora excavations. The Agora excavation area is visible in the upper center, behind the Acropolis.

Frantz started her career in the Athenian Agora excavations, conducted by the ASCSA under the direction of T. Leslie Shear, in January 1934. She initially assisted Lucy Talcott, the excavation's recording secretary, in the Record Department. (Note: Rotroff & Lamberton 2005, p. 51. For Talcott, see Sparkes 2004, p. 1.) For much of her work in the Agora excavations, Frantz was an unpaid volunteer. During the 1930s, she worked largely on Byzantine painting, and made a study of the frescoes of several churches – demolished shortly afterwards – which was illustrated by the artist and draftsman Piet de Jong. In 1935, she and Talcott visited the house of the Greek avant-garde artist Photis Kontoglou, where Frantz and Kontoglou discussed the techniques of fresco-painting.

The official photographer of the Agora excavations was Hermann Wagner, a member of the German Archaeological Institute at Athens. He was also employed in other excavation roles; from 1935, Frantz was increasingly made responsible for the photographic documentation of the project. She was given the title of official photographer when Wagner stepped down in 1939. (Note: Homer A. Thompson, director of the Agora excavations, stated in a 1994 interview that Wagner had been prohibited from returning to Greece after the Second World War, as his behavior during the German occupation "was not to the liking of the Greeks".) Later that year, just before the Second World War, Frantz photographed in two days more than six hundred tablets excavated from the Mycenaean site of Pylos; the tablets, inscribed in the Linear B script, had been brought to Athens by their excavator, Carl Blegen, for safekeeping in the Bank of Greece. A set of prints of the photographs was delivered in 1940 to the University of Cincinnati, where Blegen worked, and was used by Emmett L. Bennett to make the first transcription and edition of the tablets, which he published in 1951. Frantz's obituarist James R. McCredie credited her photographs with enabling the decipherment of Linear B by Michael Ventris in 1952, which demonstrated that the Linear B script had been used to write a form of ancient Greek.

== Second World War and aftermath ==
Plan of the Agora of Athens, with buildings as at the end of the 2nd century CE: Archaic period (c. 800 – c. 510 BCE) Classical period (c. 510–323 BCE) Hellenistic period (323–146 BCE) Roman period

Following the Italian invasion of Greece in October 1940, archaeological work in the country was suspended. Several archaeologists of the ASCSA, led by Rodney Young and Benjamin Meritt, founded the American School Committee for Aid to Greece, which purchased ambulances to send to Greek forces. Frantz joined the committee alongside T. Leslie Shear, who had worked with her on the Agora excavations, Talcott, Edward Capps, George Elderkin, Hetty Goldman and Oscar Broneer. The committee organized a benefit concert to raise funds; Frantz and Talcott also collaborated on a book of photographs, This Is Greece. (Note: Allen 2011, p. 33. On This Is Greece, see Roebuck 1941.) The book presented a romanticized view of Greece and its heritage, and its text proclaimed the centrality of democracy and independence to Greek life. The royalties for the work, published in 1941, were used for the committee's work. By the end of January 1942, the committee had distributed $24,500 (equivalent to $483,000 in 2025) for aid to Greece.

Frantz moved to Washington, D.C., where she became a fellow at the Dumbarton Oaks research institute. In the summer of 1941, she and Young received a grant of $1,000 (equivalent to $22,000 in 2025) to compile an index of the first ten volumes of Hesperia, the school's academic journal. Young left the project and joined the Office of Strategic Services, the military intelligence agency of the United States, later that year. Frantz finished creating a set of alphabetic index cards, covering almost the whole English part of the index, before herself joining the OSS in the summer of 1942.

Frantz and Young were among several archaeologists, including the Americans Blegen, Meritt, and Shear and the British Alan Wace, to serve in Allied intelligence services in Greece. (Note: McCredie 2000, pp. 215–216; Vogeikoff-Brogan 2015, p. 29. For Wace, see Allen 2011, p. 20. For the name of the Foreign Nationalities Branch, see Lalaki 2013, p. 184) She was recommended to the OSS by Meritt, then head of the Greek section of the organization's Foreign Nationalities Branch (FNB), for whom she had worked part-time as an indexer at the Institute for Advanced Study in Princeton. (Note: Lalaki 2013, p. 184; Allen 2011, p. 236 (for Meritt). On the establishment and aims of the FNB, see Szymczak 1999.) At the OSS, she initially worked in the Research and Analysis (R&A) branch, before moving later in 1942 to work as an assistant and political analyst for Blegen, who succeeded Meritt in September of that year. The FNB was primarily tasked with interviewing people residing in the United States from European and Mediterranean ethnic groups, and recording their views on the politics and situation of their native countries. Frantz's official title was Junior Social Science Analyst; her work primarily focused on interviewing political exiles from German-occupied Europe. She and Blegen were based in Washington, D.C., and she remained with Blegen as he moved to lead the FNB's Miscellaneous Languages section. Late in 1942, Blegen was appointed as head of the FNB's Chancery; Frantz once again moved with him, and was promoted to senior political analyst. In 1944, James Murphy, the head of the OSS's X-2 Counter Espionage Branch, unsuccessfully attempted to recruit Frantz for counterintelligence work.

=== Post-war government service ===
After the end of the war, the ASCSA was used as a conduit for US policy in Greece, particularly for the implementation of the Marshall Plan of economic aid. In 1946, alongside Blegen, Frantz was appointed to the Allied Mission for Observing the Greek Elections (AMFOGE), an organization of observers and statisticians sent by Britain, France and the United States to ensure the fairness of that year's elections to the Hellenic Parliament, held on March 31. Frantz arrived in Athens on January 8, where she and Blegen, based at the latter's home at 9 Ploutarchou Street, created a training course in Greek history, politics and culture for the other American members of the AMFOGE. The two delivered the course in Naples in the following February, during which time they were trained in first aid, map-reading and physical conditioning, as well as in how to drive and repair a Jeep.

Frantz returned to the Agora excavations when they resumed in the spring of 1946. She briefly worked, in the same year, for the US Information Service, the public affairs agency for the United States abroad. Between 1946 and 1949, she served as cultural attaché of the US embassy in Athens, following Blegen in the role. (Note: Vogeikoff-Brogan 2013; Davis 2013, p. 35. Hatzivassiliou erroneously states that she assumed the role in 1948.) In this capacity, she played an important role in restoring the Athens Symphony Orchestra, and established the Fulbright Program in Greece, which sent ten scholars and eight senior research fellows to the ASCSA in 1949. Throughout the 1950s, she delivered lectures on Byzantine Greece – at the time, an area rarely taught at US universities or in the ASCSA's courses – for visiting students and scholars.

== Later career ==
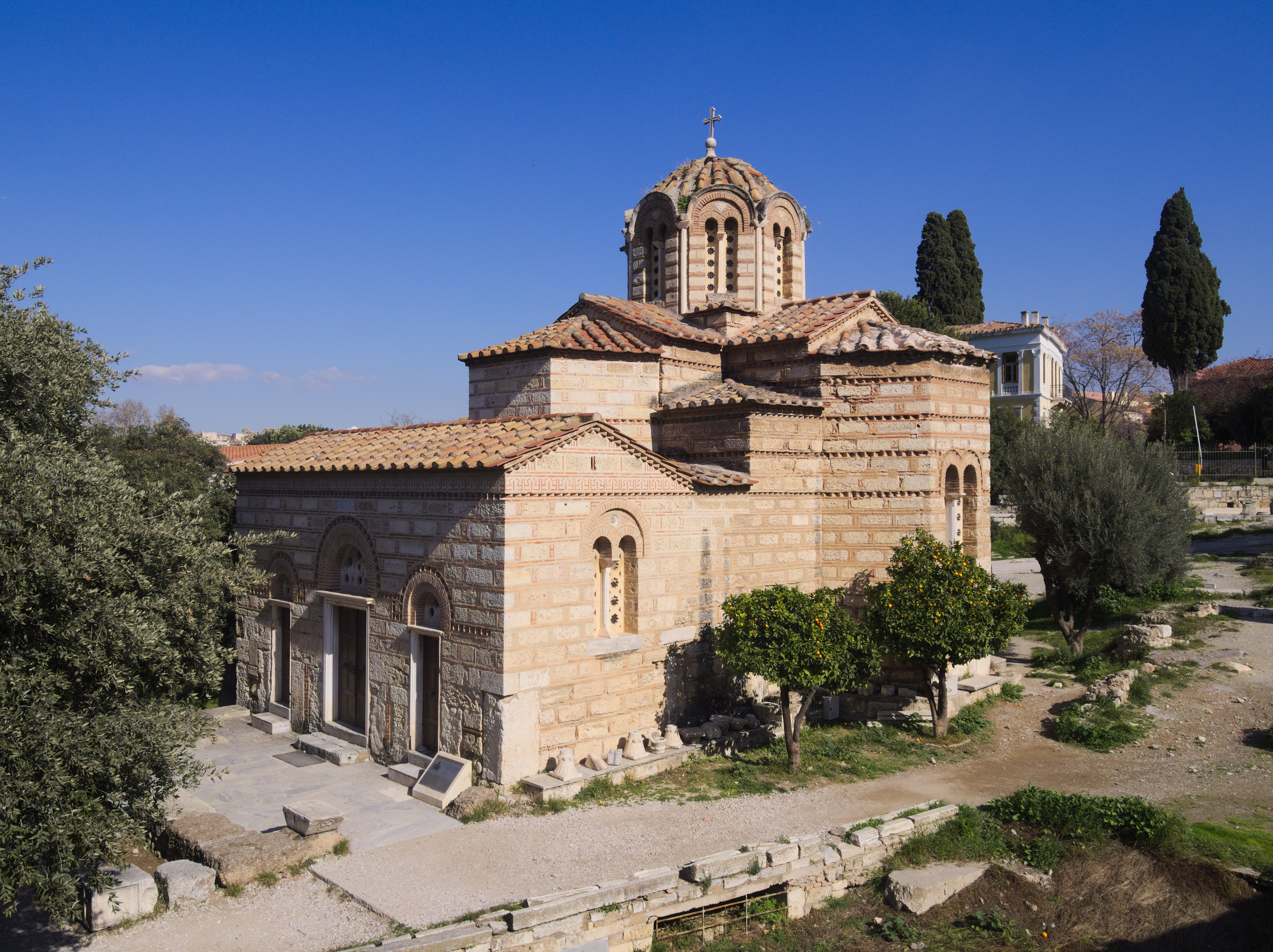
The Byzantine Church of the Holy Apostles in the Athenian Agora, restored by Frantz and John Travlos in 1954–1957

Between 1954 and 1957, Frantz and the architect John Travlos supervised the restoration of the Church of the Holy Apostles, constructed around 1100 and the only surviving Byzantine building in the Agora. (Note: Frantz 1971, p. 1; Mauzy 2006, pp. 74–89. For the date of the church's construction, see Camp 2010, p. 158.) This included the complete excavation of the building by Frantz, as well as the removal of a nineteenth-century narthex (vestibule). Around 1958, she and the art historian Rhys Carpenter climbed Mount Pentelicus, guided by Homer Thompson, the director of the Agora excavations, to photograph an unfinished marble colossal statue near the summit. She spent three days in June 1960 photographing Blegen's excavations of the Palace of Nestor at Pylos, which had by then fully uncovered the remains of the structure. In 1963–1964, she excavated the ruins of the sixteenth-century Church of St. Dionysios the Areopagite, on the northern slope of the Areopagus.

Frantz remained the official photographer of the Agora excavations until 1964. She left the project to return to live in Princeton, and focused her work on collaborating on books with other archaeologists. This included traveling to Olympia with the British archaeologist Bernard Ashmole and the Greek archaeologist Nicholas Yalouris, where she photographed the sculptures of the Temple of Zeus. Frantz considered her work on this expedition to be the best of her career.

In 1966, Frantz visited the Greek island of Sikinos for two days, during which she excavated the structure identified by Ludwig Ross in the previous century as the island's temple of Apollo Pythius. (Note: McCredie 2000, p. 216; Frantz, Thompson & Travlos 1969, pp. 400, 411. For Ross's assessment of the structure, see von Gaertringen 1909, p. 12.) She secured permission from the Greek Archaeological Service to excavate the structure: she, Travlos and Thompson returned in the last week of May 1967 to do so. Their work confirmed the earlier suggestion of Alfred Schiff that it was in fact a monumental Roman tomb, which they determined to date from the second to the third century CE. (Note: McCredie 2000, p. 216; Frantz, Thompson & Travlos 1969, pp. 400, 411; Frantz 1983, pp. 72–73. For Schiff's suggestion, see von Gaertringen 1909, pp. 11–12.) An exhibition of Frantz's photography was held at Smith College in October–November 1967, in conjunction with a symposium in honor of the archaeologist Harriet Boyd Hawes, who, like Frantz, was a Smith alumna. The exhibition focused on Frantz's images of Minoan and Mycenaean sites and artifacts: (Note: Wiencke 1970, p. 272. The volume containing Frantz's photography is Frantz 1967.) her work in this field included images of the Hagia Triada Sarcophagus.

The archaeological historian Kostis Kourelis has suggested that Frantz, after her return to the United States, tried to establish herself as a fine-art photographer rather than as a producer of archaeological documentation: he notes that her last excavation photographs were taken in 1968. In 1975, she collaborated with the British classicist Martin Robertson on his monograph about the Parthenon frieze. Smith College hosted a further exhibition of her work in 1984, which included photographs of her cats alongside more conventional archaeological material. Frantz suffered a stroke in 1994, which affected her speech and movement. On January 27, 1995, she was struck by a truck near her home in Princeton; she died on February 1 at the Robert Wood Johnson University Hospital in New Brunswick.

== Assessment and legacy ==
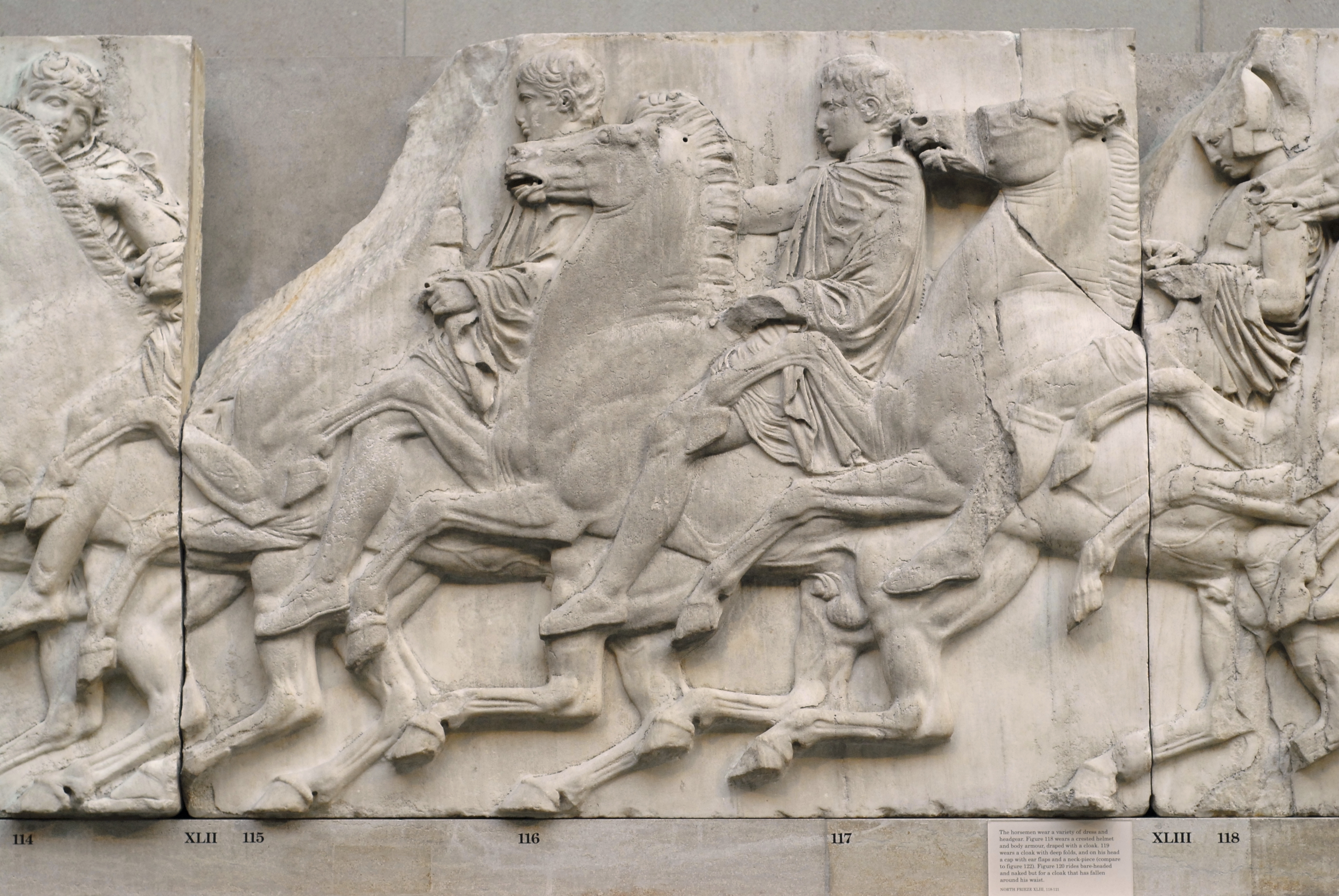
Part of the northern section of the Parthenon frieze. Frantz photographed most of the surviving sculptures from the frieze for Martin Robertson's 1975 monograph on it.

An obituary in The New York Times described Frantz as "one of the foremost archaeological photographers of Greek sites and antiquities". The quality of her photography of the Pylos Linear B tablets was praised by researchers including Ventris, John Chadwick and Sterling Dow, for whom the photographs were the only means of studying the tablets during the Second World War, as the originals were held in secure storage in Athens. In 2005, the archaeologist John K. Papadopoulos listed her among the foremost photographers of ancient Greek monuments. John Camp, who directed the Agora excavations, was quoted shortly before Frantz's death as saying "when one thinks of the great photos of the past fifty years, the name of a single individual comes to mind – Alison Frantz". Frantz frequently contributed photographs to the publications of Gisela Richter, an art historian whose works, in the words of the scholar Elizabeth Bartman, "defined the study of Greek art for Anglophone readers during much of the twentieth century".

Frantz worked on late antiquity (the period from around the third to the sixth centuries CE) at a time when the field suffered from general scholarly neglect: her biographers Amy Papalexandrou and Marie Mauzy have credited her with contributing to the reassessment of the period from one of "degeneracy" to a respectable field of research. (Note: Papalexandrou & Mauzy 2003, p. 130. For the dates of late antiquity, see Nees 2023, p. 20, with n. 14.) Kourelis writes that she "single-handedly created a field of Byzantine studies" for her work on the Agora. In their history of women in the Agora excavations, Susan I. Rotroff and Robert D. Lamberton described Frantz as being ahead of her time in her advocacy of a diachronic approach to the project, as opposed to the singular focus on the classical period then dominant in Greek archaeology. Her 1942 article on Ottoman pottery in the Agora excavations was one of the first to focus on that period in Greek archaeology, (Note: In Athens, the Ottoman period lasted from 1456 until 1833.) and was the first to exclusively handle Ottoman material; it remained one of few to do so until the 1970s. The archaeologist Joanita Vroom has listed Frantz, alongside her ASCSA colleague Frederick Waagé, as one of "the first pioneers" of Ottoman archaeology in Greece.

Frantz was one of relatively few women working professionally in either photography or archaeology during her lifetime, and became famous in the field for her work. Harrison Blackman, in a 2024 biography, described her methods as "both calculated and daring", pointing to her climbing along the top of the Parthenon's colonnade in order to photograph a sculpture on its roof. The archive of Frantz's photographs and negatives is divided between the American School of Classical Studies and Princeton University. In accordance with Frantz's instructions, the ASCSA received the works that she considered useful to classical archaeologists and art historians, while Princeton's Firestone Library received her personal photographs. Most of these were hitherto unpublished; writing in The Princeton University Library Chronicle, Patricia H. Marks called the Frantz archive "an archaeologist's dream".

In 1967, Smith College awarded Frantz the Smith College Medal, granted annually to an alumna considered to "exemplify ... the true purpose of a liberal-arts education". (Note: McCredie 2000, p. 216. For the criteria for which the medal is awarded, see "Awards and Medals". Smith College. Archived from the original on January 28, 2025.) She was elected to the American Philosophical Society in 1973. The ASCSA awards a scholarship in Frantz's honor, available to students working on post-classical Greece. In 2023, the Frantz Room in Loring Hall, the ASCSA's hostel for visiting students, was named after her.

== Selected publications ==
=== As sole author ===
- Frantz, Alison (1934). "Byzantine Illuminated Ornament: A Study in Chronology". The Art Bulletin. 16 (1): 42–101. doi:10.2307/3045526. ISSN 0004-3079. JSTOR 3045526.
- — (1935). "Late Byzantine Paintings in the Agora". Hesperia. 4 (3): 442–469. ISSN 0018-098X. JSTOR 146461.
- — (1938). "Middle Byzantine Pottery in Athens". Hesperia. 7 (3): 429–467. ISSN 0018-098X. JSTOR 146581.
- — (1940). "Digenis Akritas: A Byzantine Epic and Its Illustrators". Byzantion. 15: 87–91. ISSN 0378-2506. JSTOR 44168518.
- — (1941). "Akritas and the Dragons". Hesperia. 10 (1): 9–13. ISSN 0018-098X. JSTOR 146599.
- — (1941). "St. Spyridon: The Earlier Frescoes" (PDF). Hesperia. 10 (1): 193–198. ISSN 0018-098X. JSTOR 146560 – via American School of Classical Studies at Athens.
- — (1942). "Turkish Pottery from the Agora" (PDF). Hesperia. 11 (1): 1–28. ISSN 0018-098X. JSTOR 146529 – via American School of Classical Studies at Athens.
- — (1944). "Charles H. Morgan, II: The Byzantine Pottery (Corinth, Vol. XI), Harvard University Press, Cambridge, Mass., 1942. Pp. xv + 373; Figs. 226, Pls. LIII and Frontispiece. $15.00". The Art Bulletin. 26 (1): 58–60. doi:10.1080/00043079.1944.11409386. ISSN 0004-3079.
- — (1950). "Truth Before Beauty: Or, The Incompleat Photographer". Archaeology. 3 (4): 202–214. ISSN 0003-8113. JSTOR 41662414.
- — (1952). "A Province of the Empire: Byzantine Churches in Greece". Archaeology. 5 (4): 236–243. ISSN 0003-8113. JSTOR 41663089.
- — (1954). "The Church of the Holy Apostles at Athens". Byzantion. 24 (2): 513–520. ISSN 0378-2506. JSTOR 44161028.
- — (1961). The Middle Ages in the Athenian Agora (PDF). Excavations of the Athenian Agora: Picture Books. Vol. 7. Princeton: The American School of Classical Studies at Athens. OCLC 255845386.
- — (1965). "From Paganism to Christianity in the Temples of Athens". Dumbarton Oaks Papers. 19 (4): 185, 187–205. doi:10.2307/1291230. ISSN 0070-7546. JSTOR 1291230 – via Internet Archive.
- — (1971). The Church of the Holy Apostles (PDF). The Athenian Agora. Vol. 20. Princeton: The American School of Classical Studies at Athens. ISBN 0-87661-220-6.
- — (1975). "Pagan Philosophers in Christian Athens". Proceedings of the American Philosophical Society. 119 (1): 29–38. ISSN 0003-049X. JSTOR 986648.
- — (1979). "Did Julian the Apostate Rebuild the Parthenon?". American Journal of Archaeology. 83 (4): 395–401. doi:10.2307/504138. ISSN 0002-9114. JSTOR 504138.
- — (1982). "The Date of the Phaidros Bema in the Theater of Dionysos". Studies in Athenian Architecture, Sculpture and Topography Presented to Homer A. Thompson. Hesperia Supplements. Vol. 20. Princeton: American School of Classical Studies at Athens. pp. 34–39, 194–195. doi:10.2307/1353943. JSTOR 1353943. OCLC 8050699.
- — (1983). "Multum in Parvo: The Aegean Island of Sikinos". Proceedings of the American Philosophical Society. 127 (2): 71–83. ISSN 0002-9114. JSTOR 986190.
- — (1988). Late Antiquity A.D. 267–700 (PDF). The Athenian Agora. Vol. 24. Princeton: The American School of Classical Studies at Athens. ISBN 0-87661-224-9. (Note: Also includes contributions by John Travlos and Homer A. Thompson.)

=== As co-author ===
- Talcott, Lucy; Frantz, Alison (1941). This Is Greece. New York: Hastings House. OL 50557265M.
- Travlos, John; Frantz, Alison (1965). "The Church of St. Dionysios the Areopagite and the Palace of the Archbishop of Athens in the 16th Century" (PDF). Hesperia. 34 (3): 157–202. ISSN 0018-098X. JSTOR 147210 – via American School of Classical Studies at Athens.
- Frantz, Alison; Thompson, Homer A.; Travlos, John (1969). "The 'Temple of Apollo Pythios' on Sikinos". American Journal of Archaeology. 73 (4): 397–422. doi:10.2307/503997. ISSN 0002-9114. JSTOR 503997. S2CID 192962368.

=== As photographer ===
- Harrison, Evelyn B. (1953). Portrait Sculpture (PDF). Athenian Agora. Vol. 1. Princeton: American School of Classical Studies at Athens. OCLC 607605.
- Howland, Richard H. (1958). Greek Lamps and Their Survivals (PDF). Athenian Agora. Vol. 4. Princeton: American School of Classical Studies at Athens. OCLC 608979.
- Robinson, Henry S. (1959). Pottery of the Roman Period: Chronology (PDF). Athenian Agora. Vol. 5. Princeton: American School of Classical Studies at Athens. OCLC 715535746.
- Sparkes, Brian A.; Talcott, Lucy (1959). Pots and Pans of Classical Athens. Excavations of the Athenian Agora: Picture Books. Vol. 1. Princeton: American School of Classical Studies at Athens. OCLC 610703.
- Thompson, Dorothy Burr (1959). Miniature Sculpture from the Athenian Agora (PDF). Excavations of the Athenian Agora: Picture Books. Vol. 3. Princeton: American School of Classical Studies at Athens. OCLC 666637.
- Thompson, Homer A. (1959). The Stoa of Attalos II in Athens (PDF). Excavations of the Athenian Agora: Picture Books. Vol. 2. Princeton: American School of Classical Studies at Athens. OCLC 15930156.
- Harrison, Evelyn B. (1960). Ancient Portraits from the Athenian Agora (PDF). Excavations of the Athenian Agora: Picture Books. Vol. 5. Princeton: American School of Classical Studies at Athens. OCLC 423816.
- Lang, Mabel L. (1960). The Athenian Citizen: Democracy in the Athenian Agora. Excavations of the Athenian Agora: Picture Books. Vol. 4. Princeton: American School of Classical Studies at Athens. OCLC 992429.
- Grace, Virginia R. (1960). Amphoras and the Ancient Wine Trade. Excavations of the Athenian Agora: Picture Books. Vol. 6. Princeton: American School of Classical Studies at Athens. OCLC 2202808.
- Grandjouan, Clairève (1961). Terracottas and Plastic Lamps of the Roman Period (PDF). Athenian Agora. Vol. 6. Princeton: American School of Classical Studies at Athens. OCLC 715172344.
- Richter, Gisela M. (1961). The Archaic Gravestones of Attica. London: Phaidon. OCLC 503994781.
- Perlzweig, Judith (1961). Lamps of the Roman Period: First to Seventh Century After Christ (PDF). Athenian Agora. Vol. 7. Princeton: American School of Classical Studies at Athens. OCLC 1131105737.
- Brann, Eva T. H. (1962). Late Geometric and Protoattic Pottery: Mid 8th to Late 7th Century BCE (PDF). Athenian Agora. Vol. 8. Princeton: American School of Classical Studies at Athens. OCLC 423865.
- Thompson, Dorothy Burr; Griswold, Ralph E. (1963). Garden Lore of Ancient Athens (PDF). Excavations of the Athenian Agora: Picture Books. Vol. 8. Princeton: American School of Classical Studies at Athens. OCLC 4568376.
- Lang, Mabel; Crosby, Margaret (1964). Weights, Measures, and Tokens (PDF). Athenian Agora. Vol. 10. Princeton: American School of Classical Studies at Athens. OCLC 715034516.
- Perlzweig, Judith (1964). Lamps from the Athenian Agora (PDF). Excavations of the Athenian Agora: Picture Books. Vol. 9. Princeton: American School of Classical Studies at Athens. OCLC 917395922.
- Harrison, Evelyn B. (1965). Archaic and Archaistic Sculpture (PDF). Athenian Agora. Vol. 11. Princeton: American School of Classical Studies at Athens. OCLC 715279073.
- Meritt, Benjamin D. (1966). Inscriptions from the Athenian Agora (PDF). Excavations of the Athenian Agora: Picture Books. Vol. 10. Princeton: American School of Classical Studies at Athens. OCLC 669208.
- Ashmole, Bernard; Yalouris, Nicholas (1967). Olympia: The Sculptures of the Temple of Zeus. London: Phaidon. OCLC 11444853.
- — (1967). A Land Called Crete: Photographs of Minoan and Mycenaean Sites by Alison Frantz. Northampton: Smith College Museum of Art. OCLC 1947239 – via Internet Archive.
- Lang, Mabel (1968). Waterworks in the Athenian Agora (PDF). Excavations of the Athenian Agora: Picture Books. Vol. 11. Princeton: American School of Classical Studies at Athens. ISBN 0-87661-611-2.
- Richter, Gisela M. (1968). Korai: Archaic Greek Maidens. London: Phaidon. OCLC 473818998.
- Alsop, Joseph (1970). From the Silent Earth: A Report on the Greek Bronze Age. London: Penguin. ISBN 0-14-021166-7.
- Sparkes, Brian A.; Talcott, Lucy (1970). Black and Plain Pottery of the 6th, 5th, and 4th Centuries BC (PDF). Athenian Agora. Vol. 12. Princeton: American School of Classical Studies at Athens. ISBN 0-87661-212-5.
- Robertson, Martin (1975). The Parthenon Frieze. London: Phaidon. ISBN 0-7148-1659-0.

== Works cited ==
- Allen, Susan Heuck (2011). Classical Spies: American Archaeologists with the OSS in World War II Greece. Ann Arbor: University of Michigan Press. ISBN 978-0-472-03539-7.
- "Announcements". The Smith Alumnae Quarterly. Alumnae Association of Smith College. February 1934. p. 330 – via Internet Archive.
- Bartman, Elizabeth (January 14, 2022). "Archaeologists You Should Know: Gisela Marie Augusta Richter". Archaeological Institute of America.
- Blackman, Harrison (July 2, 2024). "Through Archaeology, Diplomacy, She Brought America and Greece Together". Princeton Alumni Weekly.
- Blegen, Carl (1960). "The Palace of Nestor (1960)". Αρχαιολογικόν Δελτίον [Archaeological Bulletin]. 16: 110–112. ISSN 0570-622X.
- Bouras, Charalambos (2018). Byzantine Athens: 10th–12th Centuries. Abingdon: Routledge. ISBN 978-1-351-59697-8.
- Camp, John McKesson (2010). The Athenian Agora: Site Guide (5th ed.). Princeton: American School of Classical Studies at Athens. ISBN 978-1-62139-016-9.
- Carpenter, Rhys (1968). "The Unfinished Colossus on Mt. Pendeli". American Journal of Archaeology. 72 (3): 279–280. doi:10.2307/503555. ISSN 0003-8113. JSTOR 503555. S2CID 193120621.
- Davis, Jack (2013). "The American School of Classical Studies and the Politics of Volunteerism". Hesperia. 82 (1): 15–48. doi:10.2972/hesperia.82.1.0015. ISSN 0018-098X. JSTOR 10.2972/hesperia.82.1.0015. S2CID 148581240.
- Dow, Sterling (1954). "Minoan Writing". American Journal of Archaeology. 58 (2): 77–129. doi:10.2307/500110. ISSN 0002-9114. JSTOR 500110. S2CID 245265302.
- Dumont, Sylvie (2020). Vrysaki: A Neighborhood Lost in Search of the Athenian Agora. Princeton: The American School of Classical Studies at Athens. ISBN 978-0-87661-969-8.
- Elliott, J. Michael (February 10, 1995). "Alison Frantz, 91, Site Photographer at Excavations". The New York Times. Section A, p. 26.
- von Gaertringen, Friedrich Hiller, ed. (1909). Inscriptiones Cycladum [Inscriptions of the Cyclades]. Inscriptiones Graecae (in Latin). Vol. 12, fasc. 5. Berlin: Georg Reimer. OCLC 11996150.
- Hatzivassiliou, Evanthis (2014). "Shallow Waves and Deeper Currents: The U.S. Experience of Greece, 1947–1961. Policies, Historicity, and the Cultural Dimension". Diplomatic History. 38 (1): 83–110. doi:10.1093/dh/dht088. ISSN 0145-2096.
- Karidis, Dimitris N. (2014). Athens from 1456 to 1920: The Town under Ottoman Rule and the 19th-Century Capital City. Oxford: Archaeopress. ISBN 978-1-905739-71-4.
- Kourelis, Kostis (2007). "Byzantium and the Avant-Garde: Excavations at Corinth, 1920s–1930s". Hesperia. 76 (2): 391–442. doi:10.2972/hesp.76.2.391. ISSN 0018-098X. JSTOR 25068026. S2CID 162303616.
- Kourelis, Kostis (May 2, 2009). "Alison Frantz Studies". Objects-Building-Situations.
- Lalaki, Despina (2013). "Soldiers of Science—Agents of Culture: American Archaeologists in the Office of Strategic Services (OSS)". Hesperia. 82 (1): 179–202. doi:10.2972/hesperia.82.1.0179. ISSN 0018-098X. JSTOR 10.2972/hesperia.82.1.0179. S2CID 157287400.
- MacKay, Camilla (2014). "Three Late Medieval Kilns from the Athenian Agora". In Daly, Kevin F.; Riccardi, Lee Ann (eds.). Cities Called Athens: Studies Honoring John McK. Camp II. Lewisburg: Bucknell University Press. pp. 273–288. ISBN 978-1-61148-618-6.
- Marks, Patricia H. (1997). "Cover Note". The Princeton University Library Chronicle. 58 (3): 602–603. doi:10.25290/prinunivlibrchro.58.3.0602. JSTOR 10.25290/prinunivlibrchro.58.3.0602.
- Mauzy, Craig (2006). Agora Excavations 1931–2006: A Pictorial History. Princeton: American School of Classical Studies at Athens. ISBN 978-0-87661-910-0.
- McCredie, James R. (June 2000). "Alison Frantz" (PDF). Proceedings of the American Philosophical Society. 144 (2): 213–217. ISSN 0003-049X. JSTOR 1515634. Archived from the original (PDF) on November 2, 2013.
- Meritt, Benjamin D. (1943). "Report of the Chairman of the Committee on Publications". American School of Classical Studies at Athens: Sixty-Second Annual Report, 1942–1943 (PDF). pp. 33–39. ISSN 0360-6651 – via American School of Classical Studies at Athens.
- Meritt, Lucy Shoe (1984). History of the American School of Classical Studies at Athens 1939–1980. Princeton: American School of Classical Studies at Athens. ISBN 0-87661-942-1.
- Moschovi, Alexandra (2016) [2015]. "Greece as Photograph: Images, Photographies, Theories". In Carabott, Philip; Hamilakis, Yannis; Papargyriou, Eleni (eds.). Camera Graeca: Photographs, Narratives, Materialities. Centre for Hellenic Studies, King's College London, Publications. Vol. 16. London: Routledge. pp. 53–76. ISBN 978-1-4724-2476-1.
- Nauert, Jean Porter (1965). "The Hagia Triada Sarcophagus: An Iconographical Study". Antike Kunst. 8 (2): 91–98. ISSN 0003-5688. JSTOR 41319153.
- Nees, Lawrence (2023). Illuminating the Word in the Early Middle Ages. Cambridge University Press. doi:10.1017/9781009193870. ISBN 978-1-009-19387-0.
- Papadopoulos, John K. (2005). "Antiquity Depicted". In Lyons, Claire L.; Papadopoulos, John K.; Stewart, Lindsey S.; Szegedy-Maszak, Andrew (eds.). Antiquity and Photography: Early Views of Ancient Mediterranean Sites (PDF). Los Angeles: J. Paul Getty Museum. pp. 104–147. ISBN 978-0-89236-805-1.
- Papalexandrou, Amy; Mauzy, Marie (2003). "The Photographs of Alison Frantz: Revealing Antiquity through the Lens". History of Photography. 27 (2): 130–143. doi:10.1080/03087298.2003.10443264. ISSN 0308-7298.
- "A Photographic Journey Through Time: 1940–1984: An Exhibition of Photos by Alison Frantz" (PDF). American School of Classical Studies at Athens Newsletter. Summer 1984.
- Prévost, Jean-Guy (2018). "The 1946 Allied Mission to Observe Greek Elections". Histoire & mesure. 33 (2): 163–192. doi:10.4000/histoiremesure.8146. ISSN 1957-7745.
- Ridgway, Brunilde Sismondo (1975). "Review of The Parthenon Frieze, by Martin Robertson and Alison Frantz". Archaeology. 28: 277. ISSN 0003-8113 – via Bryn Mawr College.
- Roebuck, Carl (1941). "Reviewed Work(s): This is Greece by Lucy Talcott and M. Alison Frantz". Classical Philology. 36 (3): 317–318. doi:10.1086/362540. ISSN 0009-837X. JSTOR 265301.
- Rotroff, Susan; Lamberton, Robert D. (2005). Women in the Athenian Agora (PDF). Excavations of the Athenian Agora: Picture Books. Vol. 26. Athens: American School of Classical Studies at Athens. ISBN 978-0-87661-644-4.
- Smith College Museum of Art (1984). Alison Frantz: A Photographic Journey Through Time, 1940–1984. Northampton: Smith College Museum of Art. OCLC 19634679.
- Sparkes, Brian (2004). Joukowsky, Martha Sharp; Lesko, Barbara S. (eds.). "Lucy Talcott: 1899–1970" (PDF). Breaking Ground: Pioneering Women Archaeologists. Brown University.
- Szegedy-Maszak, Andrew (1995). "Portrait of a Purist". Archaeology. 48 (1): 58–64. ISSN 0003-8113. JSTOR 41766546.
- Szymczak, Robert (1999). "Uneasy Observers: The OSS Foreign Nationalities Branch and Perceptions of Polish Nationalism in the United States during World War II". Polish American Studies. 56 (1): 7–73. ISSN 0032-2806. JSTOR 20148555.
- Thompson, Homer A.; Smith, Richard Cándida; Lyons, Claire L. (1997). The Athenian Agora: Evidence and Interpretation. Los Angeles: The J. Paul Getty Trust. OCLC 889845649.
- Thompson, Homer A. (1953). "Excavations in the Athenian Agora: 1952". Hesperia. 22 (1): 25–56. doi:10.2307/500030. ISSN 0018-098X. JSTOR 500030. S2CID 192250611.
- Tracy, Stephen V. (2018). "The Acceptance of the Greek Solution for Linear B". Hesperia. 87 (1): 1–16. doi:10.2972/hesperia.87.1.0001. ISSN 0018-098X. JSTOR 10.2972/hesperia.87.1.0001. S2CID 186486561.
- Ventris, Michael; Chadwick, John (1973). Documents in Mycenaean Greek (2nd ed.). Cambridge: Cambridge University Press. ISBN 0-521-08558-6.
- Vogeikoff-Brogan, Natalia; Davis, Jack L. (2015). "Introduction". In Vogeikoff-Brogan, Natalia; Davis, Jack; Florou, Vasiliki (eds.). Carl Blegen: Personal and Archaeological Narratives. Atlanta: Lockwood Press. pp. 1–15. ISBN 978-1-937040-23-9.
- Vogeikoff-Brogan, Natalia (August 5, 2019). "To Live Alone and Like It: Women and the American School of Classical Studies at Athens Between the Wars". From the Archivist's Notebook.
- Vogeikoff-Brogan, Natalia (July 16, 2013). "The Not-So-Shallow Waves of Cold War Cultural Diplomacy". From the Archivist's Notebook.
- Vogeikoff-Brogan, Natalia (2015). "The Life of Carl W. Blegen from a Grass Roots Perspective". In Vogeikoff-Brogan, Natalia; Davis, Jack; Florou, Vasiliki (eds.). Carl W. Blegen: Personal and Archaelogical Narratives. Atlanta: Lockwood Press. pp. 17–38. ISBN 978-1-937040-23-9.
- Vroom, Joanita (2007). "Kütahya Between the Lines: Post-Medieval Ceramics as Historical Information". In Davies, Siriol; Davis, Jack L. (eds.). Between Venice and Istanbul: Colonial Landscapes in Early Modern Greece. Hesperia Supplements. Vol. 40. Princeton: American School of Classical Archaeology at Athens. pp. 71–96. ISBN 978-0-87661-540-9.
- Wiencke, Martha Heath (1970). "Review: A Land Called Crete: A Symposium in Memory of Harriet Boyd". Archaeology. 23 (3): 272. ISSN 0003-8113. JSTOR 41674179.
