= Propylaea (Acropolis of Athens) =

Monumental gateway to the Acropolis of Athens

Coordinates: 37°58′18″N 23°43′30″E

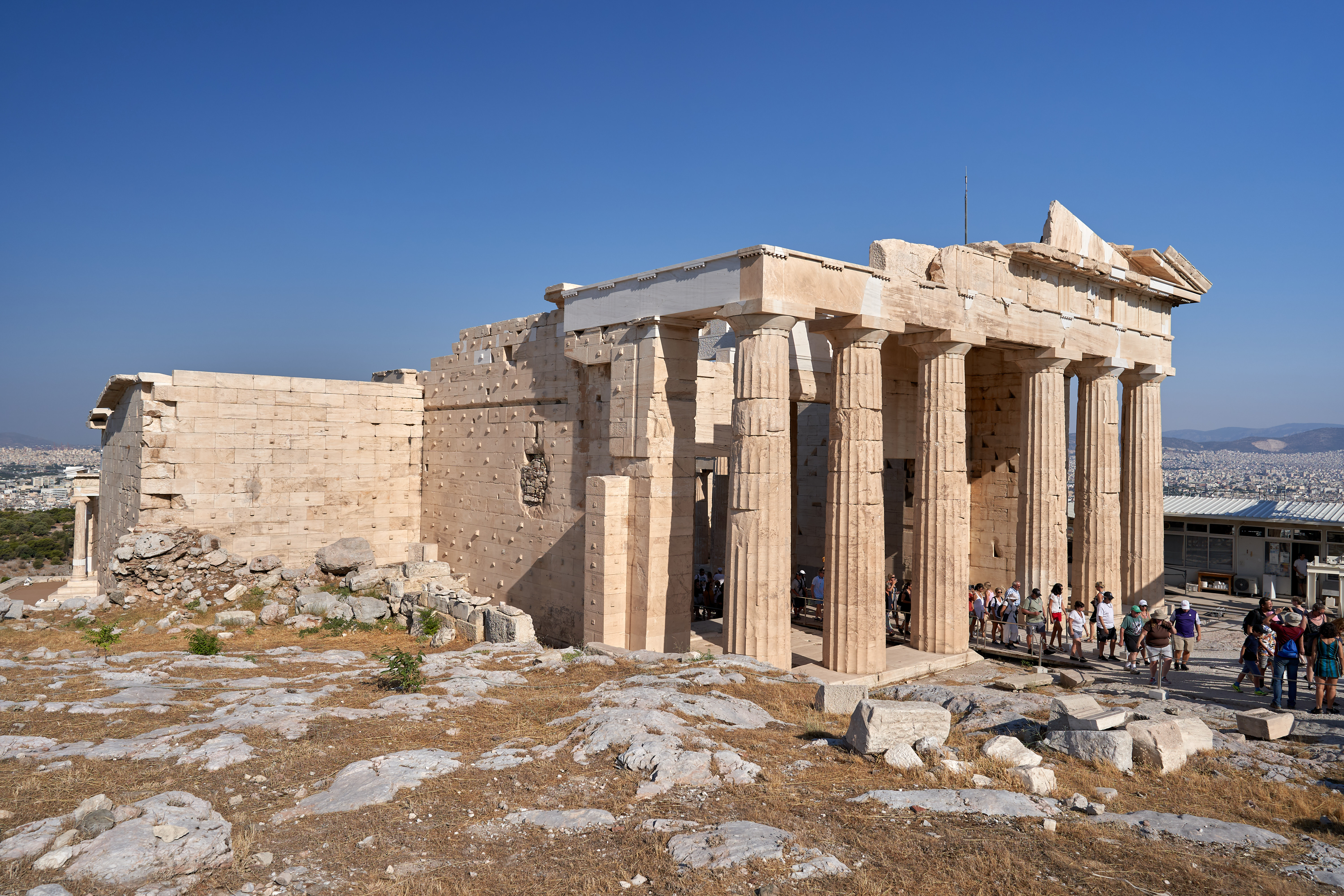
Propylaea east façade

The Propylaea or Propylaia (Greek: Προπύλαια, Propýlaia, lit. 'that which is before the gates') is the classical Greek Doric building complex that functioned as the monumental ceremonial gateway to the Acropolis of Athens. Built between 437 and 432 BC as a part of the Periklean Building Program, it was the last in a series of gatehouses built on the citadel. Its architect was Mnesikles, the architect of the Erechtheion, as identified by Plutarch. It is evident from traces left on the extant building that the plan for the Propylaea evolved considerably during its construction, and that the project was ultimately abandoned in an unfinished state although a part of it was completed.

== History ==
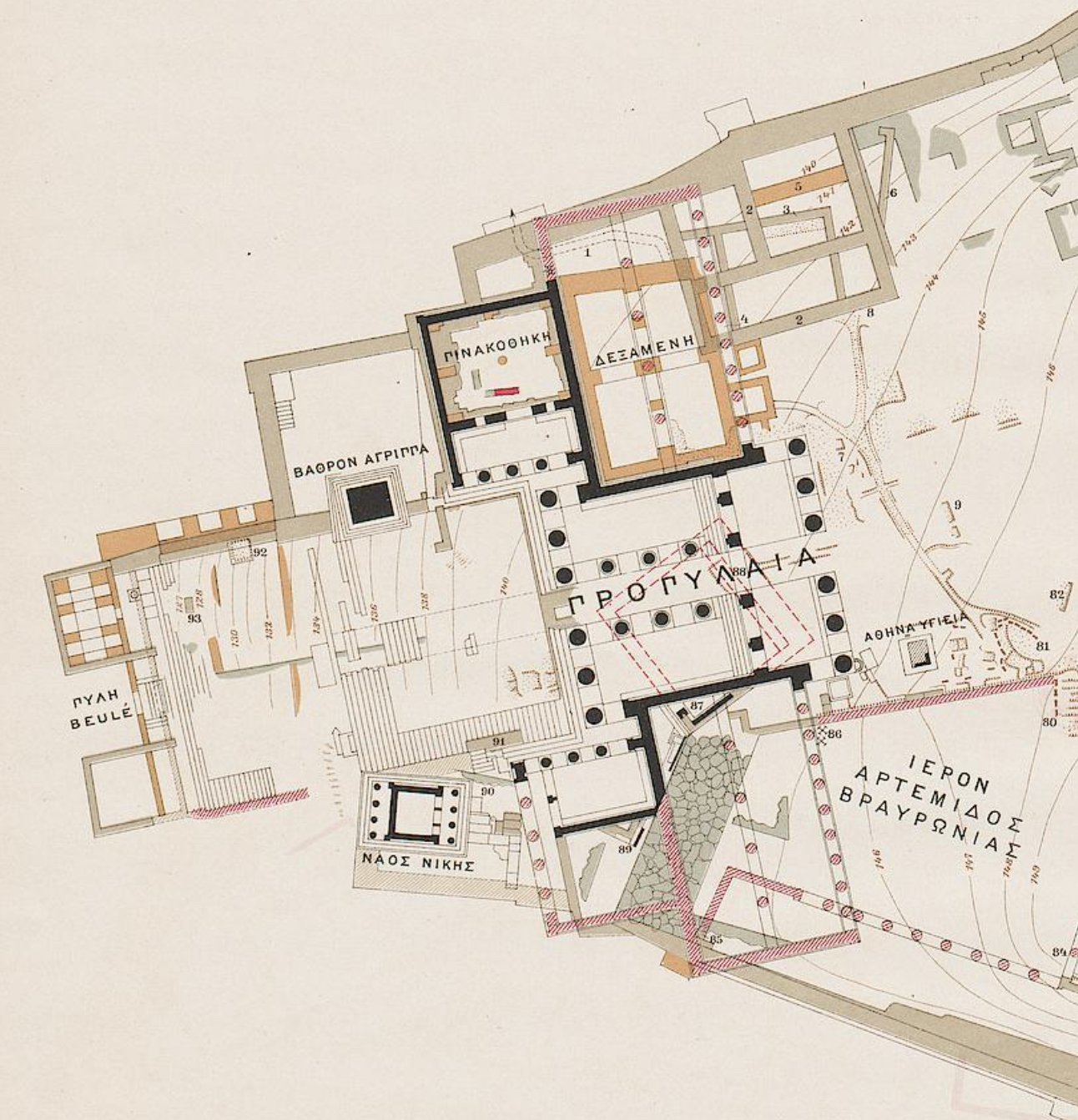
Topographical map of the Propylaea by G. Kawerau, reconstructions are in red. The remains of the Older Propylon are indicated at 87, and its conjectured placement is the dotted red line adjacent.

The approach to the Acropolis is determined by its geography. The only easily accessible pathway to the plateau lies between what is now the bastion of the Temple of Athena Nike and the terrace of the Agrippa Monument. In Mycenaean times the bastion (also referred to as the pyrgos or tower) was encased in a cyclopean wall, and amongst the few Mycenaean structures left in the archaeological record is a substantial wall on the terrace of the bastion that was part of the system of fortifications of the Acropolis. This wall must have terminated at the first gateway, though opinions differ on the reconstruction of this earliest entrance. At some point in the archaic period a ramp replaced the bedrock pathway; the buttress wall on the north side of the existing stairway is from this period. This was followed shortly after Marathon by a programme of renovation on the Acropolis including the replacement of the gateway with a ceremonial entrance, usually referred to as the Older Propylon, and the refurbishment of the forecourt in front of it. At this time, a section of the western Bronze Age wall, south of the gateway, received a marble lining on its western face and an integrated base at the northern extent for a perirrhanterion, or lustral basin. Bundgaard identified several remnants of this propylon and postulated a significant gatehouse situated between the Mycenaean wall and the archaic apsidal structure known as Building B. What is evident, however, is that if the archaic gatehouse was not destroyed in the Persian attack of 480 then it must surely have been dismantled to facilitate the building works later in the century.

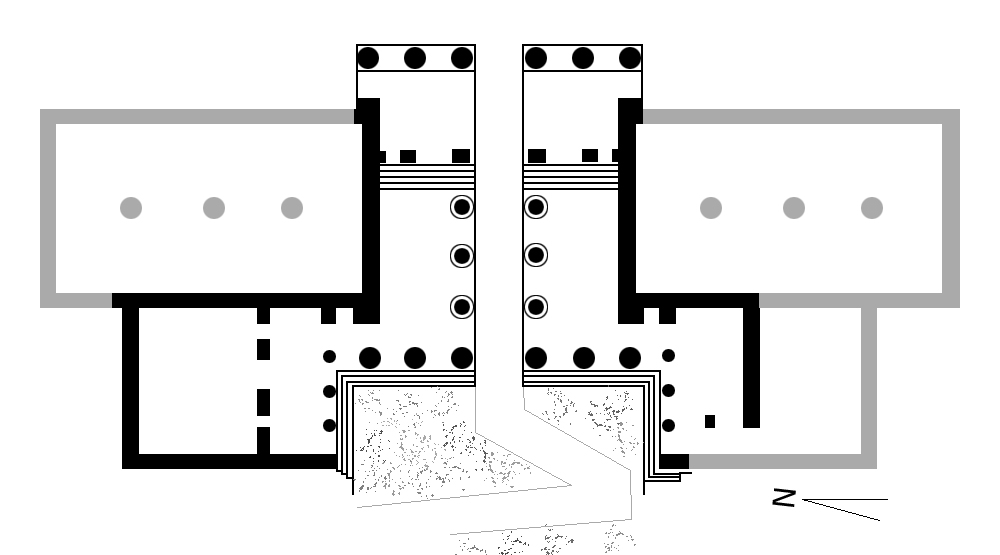
Propylaea's conjectured original plan in gray, extant building in black

Mnesikles was appointed architect of the new propylon in 438. From traces left in the construction of the final building it has been possible to reconstruct the development of the building plans during its construction. It was the practice of Greek builders to prepare for the bonding of joining walls, roof timber and other features in advance of the following phase of construction. From the socket for the roof beam and the spur walls on the north and south flanks of the central hall it can be discerned that the original plan was for a much larger building than its final form. Mnesikles had planned a gatehouse composed of five halls: a central hall that would be the processional route to the Acropolis, two perpendicular flanking halls – north and south of the central hall – that would have spanned the whole width of the western end of the plateau, and two further, eastward projecting halls that were at 90 degrees to the north-south halls. Of these only the central hall, the north-east hall (the Pinakotheke) and a truncated version of the south-east hall reached completion. Furthermore, it is evident from the adaption of the stylobate that a stepped platform was added to the interior of the central hall such that the western-most tympanum and roof were raised above the rest of the building. The reasons for these alterations have been the cause of much speculation. They include practical considerations of the site, religious objections to the displacement of the adjoining shrines, and cost. Whatever the reason it is clear that the project was abandoned in an unfinished state in 432 with the lifting bosses remaining and the surface of the ashlar blocks left undressed.

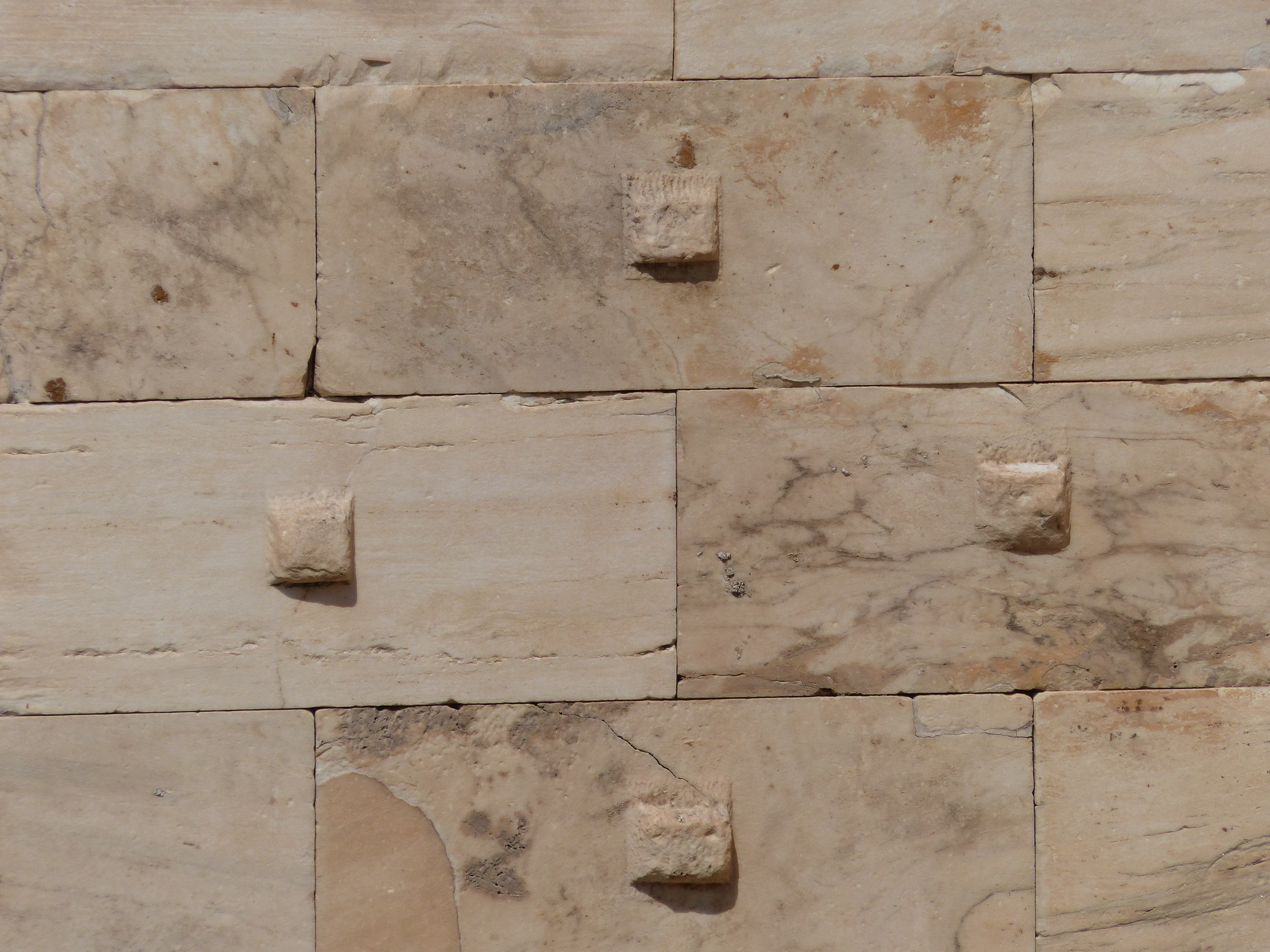
"Lifting bosses" on the Propylaea

Alterations to the Propylaea in the classical period were slight, the most significant being the construction of a monumental stairway in pentelic marble built in the reign of Claudius, probably 42 AD, and arranged as a straight flight of steps. This included a central inclined plane along which the sacrificial animals could be led, also a small dog-leg stairway on the Nike bastion that led to the Temple of Athena Nike. This project was supervised by the Athenian Tib. Claudius Novius, and is assumed to have been an Imperial benefaction from the great expense that must have been occurred.

The Propylaea's post-classical history sees it return to a military function beginning with the construction of the Beulé Gate in the late third century AD, perhaps associated with the refortification of Athens in the form of the Post-Herulian Wall. Built from the dismantled elements of the Choragic Monument of Nikias this gate may have been in response to the Herulian invasions. Sometime in the early Byzantine period the south wing was converted into a chapel. This conversion must not have taken place before the end of the sixth century, since in all other cases of ancient monuments being converted into Christian churches, there is no evidence of an earlier application of such a process. The central section of the Propylaea was converted into a church in the tenth century AD when it was dedicated to the Taxiarches. The colonnade of the north-east wing was also walled off. In the same period, and specifically during the reign of Justinian, the large cistern between the north wing and the central building of the Propylaea was also constructed. During the De la Roche era of occupation the complex was converted to a fortified residence similar in form to the crusader castles of the Levant by building the Rizokastro Wall, fortifying the Klepsydra, removing the entrance through the Beulé Gate, building the protective enclosure in front of the gate to the west of the south-west corner of the Nike Tower (now the only remaining entrance to the Acropolis) and also building the bastion between the Nike bastion and the Agrippa pedestal. The Propylaea then served as Ducal Palace to the Acciaioli family, at which time the so-called Frankish Tower was built. In the main building, the central passage still served as the only means of entry to the interior of the Acropolis. It is almost certain that the spaces between the Doric and Ionic columns of the northern part of the west hall were blocked by, probably low, walls, limiting a space that would have served as an antechamber for the ruler's residence in the north wing.

Under the Tourkokratia the Propylaea served both as a powder magazine and battery emplacement and suffered significant damage as a result. Only after the evacuation of the Turkish garrison could excavation and restoration work begin. From 1834 onwards the Medieval and Turkish additions to the Propylaea were demolished. By 1875 the Frankish Tower built on the south wing of the Propylaea was demolished, this marked the end of the clearing of the site of its post-classical accretions. The second major anastylosis since the early work of Pittakis and Rangavis was undertaken by engineer Nikolaos Balanos in 1909-1917.

== Architecture and sculpture ==
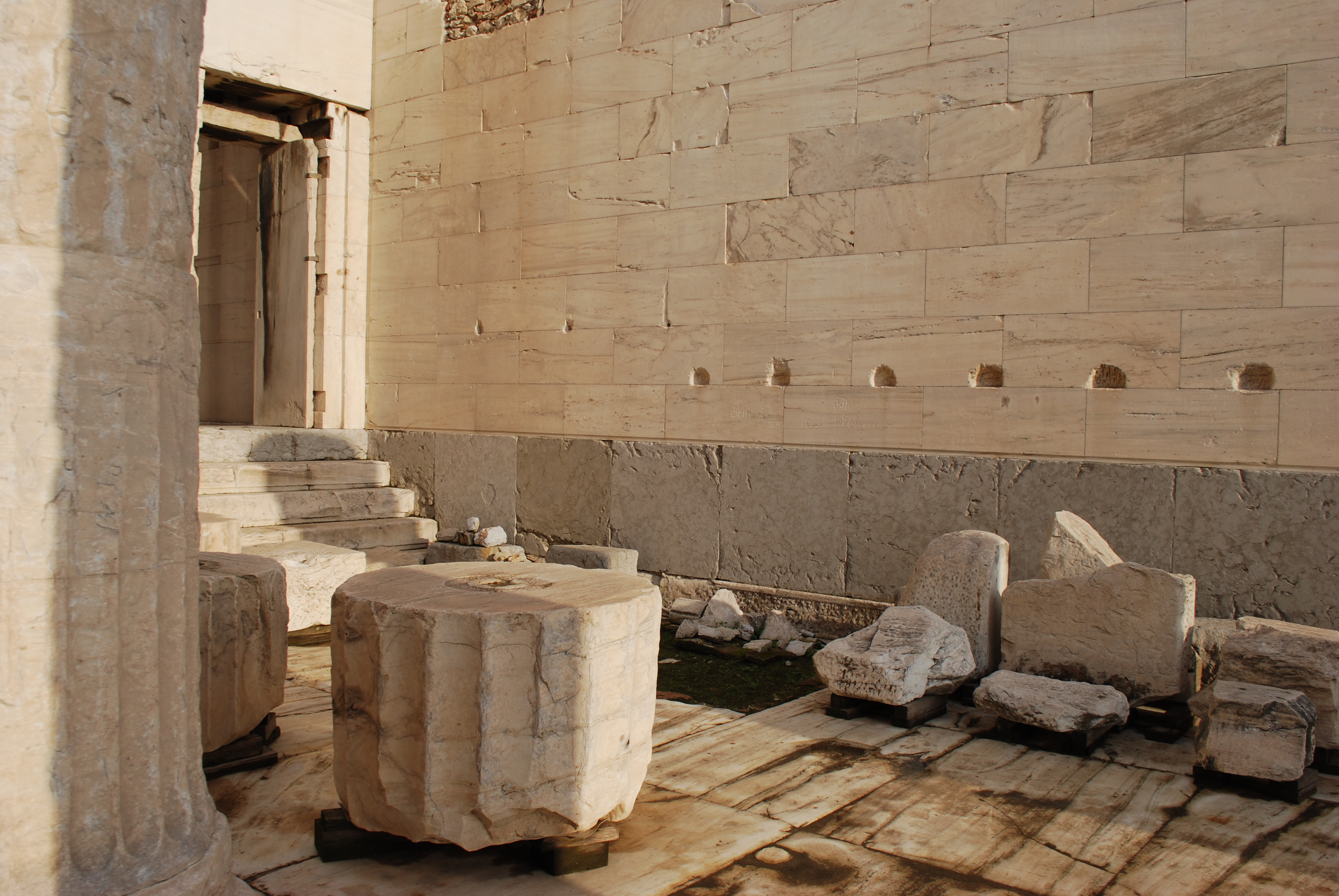
Interior of the Central Hall

The Propylaea is approached from the west by means of the Beulé Gate, which as noted was a late Roman addition to the fortification of the citadel. Beyond this is the archaic ramp leading to the zig-zag Mnesiklean ramp that remains today. Immediately ahead is the U-shaped structure of the central hall and eastward wings. The central hall is a hexastyle Doric pronaos whose central intercolumniation is spaced one triglyph and one metope wider than the others. This central pathway, which leads through to the plateau, passes under a double row of Ionic columns the capitals of which are orientated north-south, and is axially parallel with the Parthenon. The westward-projecting wings are attached to the central hall by way of a tristyle in antis Doric colonnade of a scale two-thirds of that of the central hall. The crepidoma of the wings is in the canonical three-step form and in Pentelic marble, but the last course of the euthynteria below is in a contrasting blue Eleusian limestone. The orthostates of the two wings were also made of dark Eleusinian limestone, this visual continuity was maintained with the orthostates of the central hall and the top step on the interior flight of stairs all constructed in the same limestone. The interior of the Central Hall is divided by a wall in which there are five doorways symmetrically arranged; the eponymous gates. The ceilings were supported by marble beams (about 6 m long) and the innermost squares of the coffers (Doric and Ionic coffers were both used) were decorated either with golden stars on a blue field with a bright green margin or an arrangement of palmettes. The roofs were covered with Pentelic marble tiles. The building had some of the optical refinements of the Parthenon: inward inclination and entasis of the columns and curvature of the architrave. However, the stylobate had no curvature. Some of its parts also shared the proportions with the Parthenon. For instance, the general ratio used was 3:7, very similar to the ratio of 4:9 used for the Parthenon.

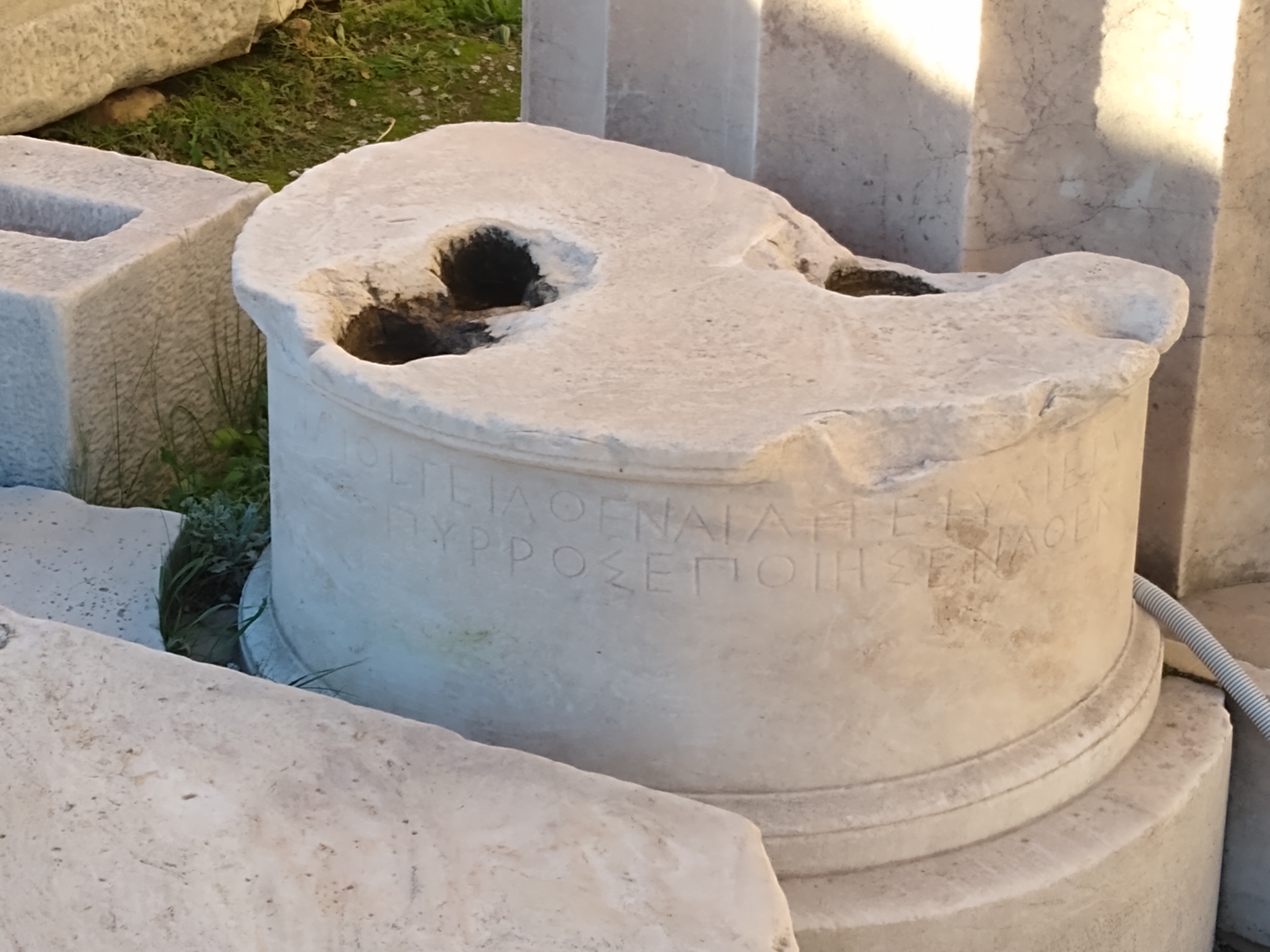
Pedestal of the statue of Hygieia

The building features no decorative or architectural sculpture; all metopes and pediments were left empty and there were no akroteria. Nonetheless, a number of freestanding shrines and votives stood in the vicinity of the Propylaea, and have come to be associated with it if only by virtue of Pausanias' description of them and their proximity to the building. In the western precinct, there was the Hermes Propylaios by Alkamenes, which stood on the north end of the entrance. Similarly, a relief of the Graces, made by Sokrates (the Boeotian sculptor active around 450 BC), stood on the south of the entrance. In the east precinct, the bronze statue of Diotrephes, an Athenian general killed in combat in Boeotia during the Peloponnesian War, stood behind the second column from the south. The statue of Aphrodite made by Kalamis and dedicated by Kallias stood behind the second column from the north. The Leaina (an Archaic bronze lioness) stood near the north wall. A votive column carrying a young rooster probably stood along the south wall. A small shrine dedicated to Athena Hygieia was erected against the southernmost column on the eastern facade soon after 430 BC. Though accounts differ, this last shrine might have been erected to thank Athena for the end of the great plague.

== Pinakotheke ==
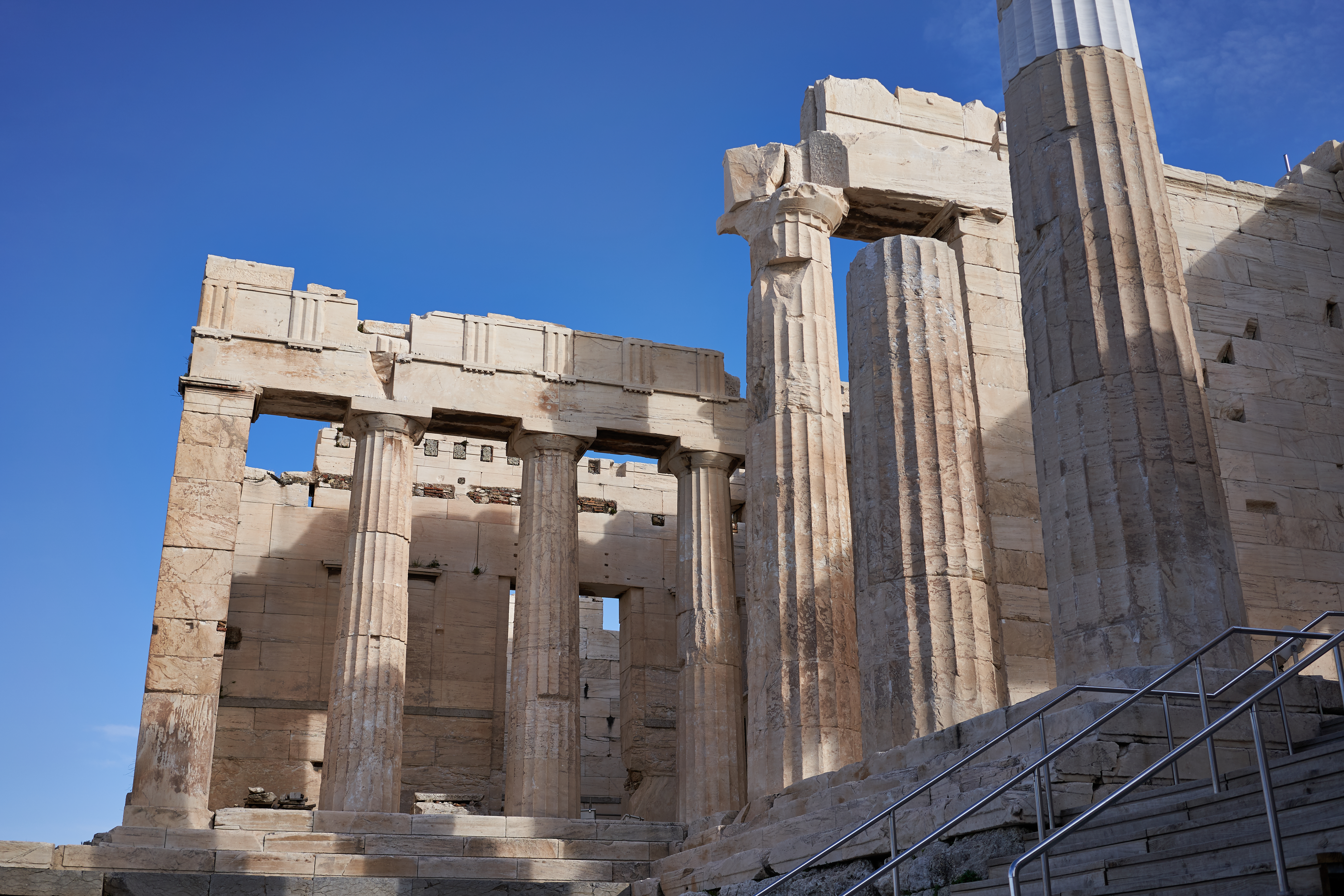
The Pinakotheke (left)

Pausanias records that the inner compartment of the north-east wing was used to display paintings; he calls it οἴκημα ἔχον γραφάς, 'a chamber with paintings', and describes a number of works by masters of the fifth century. By Pausanias' time the picture gallery had been in existence for several centuries, so the Hellenistic historian Polemon of Ilion had written a, now lost, book entitled Περὶ τῶν ἐντοῖς Προπυλαίοις πινάκων 'On the Panel Paintings in the Propylaea' which might have been an influence on the later writer. Satyros, writing in the third century, described two panels dedicated by Alkibiades after his victories in the chariot race at Olympia and Nemea. Also, a painting depicting Diomedes and Odysseus taking the Palladion from Troy, and the painting depicting Achilles on Skyros, painted by Polygnotos around 450 BC. On the basis of these references, modern writers have frequently called the building the Pinakotheke, but there is no ancient authority for that epithet and no reason to believe the building was intended to be a picture gallery.

One particular problem posed by the northwest wing has been to explain the asymmetric placement of the doorway and windows in the front wall behind the colonnade. It was John Travlos who first observed that in the placement of its door the chamber resembled Greek banqueting rooms, both the androns of private houses and the larger dining halls associated with sanctuaries. His demonstration that seventeen dining couches could be placed end to end around the four walls of the room has become the consensus view, and the idea has been developed further to explain the intended function of the four subsidiary halls of the Propylaia in the original plan as banqueting facilities for the city’s high officials after the sacrifices at the Panathenaic festival. Though this argument remains speculative.

== Reception and influence ==
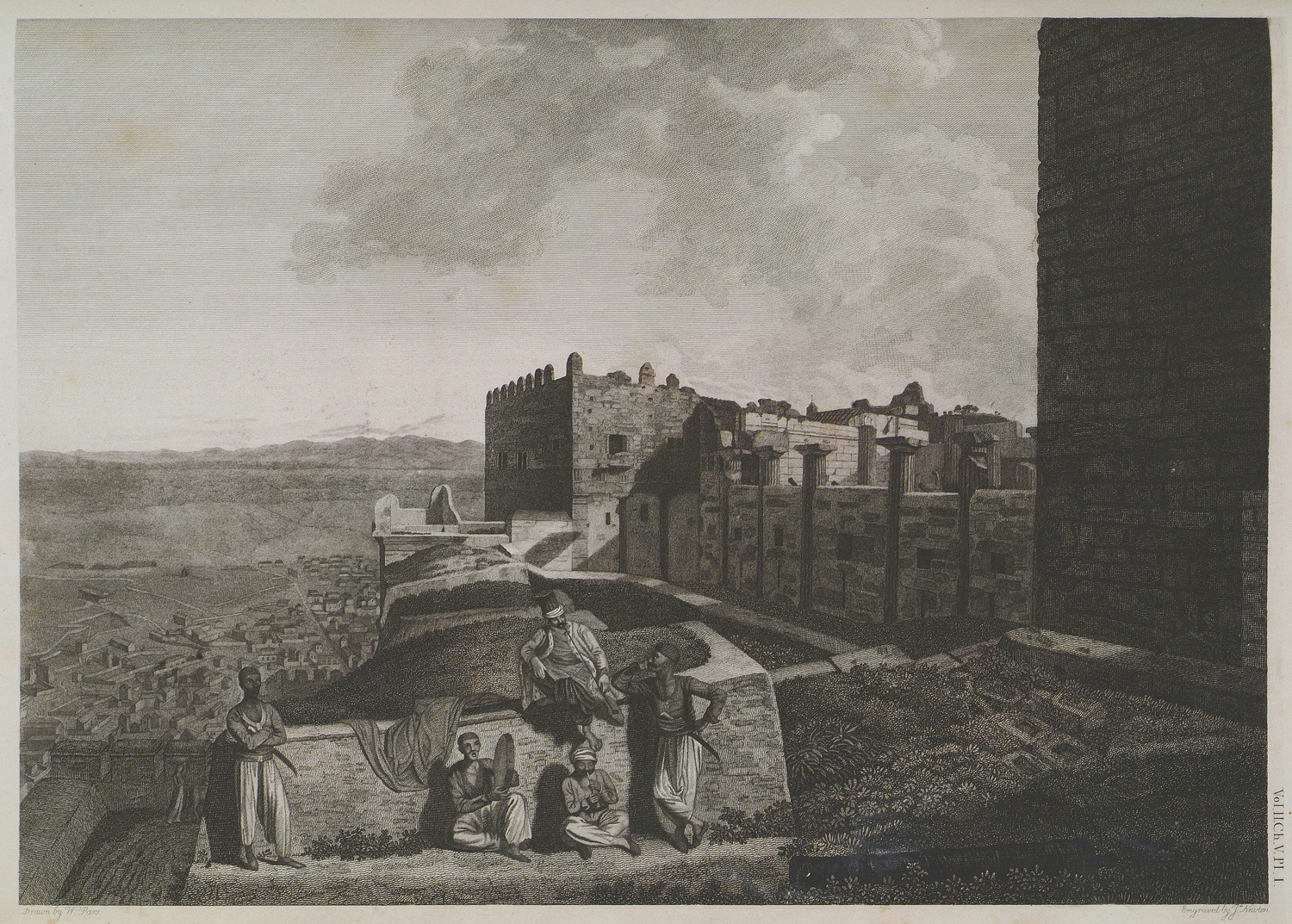
Propylaea in the late 18th century

Despite being unfinished the Propylaea was admired in its own time. Demosthenes in his speech Against Androtion 23.13 describes the victors of Salamis as "the men who from the spoils of the barbarians built the Parthenon and Propylaea, and decorated the other temples, things in which we all take a natural pride". This revealing passage not only equates the Parthenon and gatehouse in significance but associates them with the heroic past. His political rival Aeschines also made laudatory reference to the Propylaea when on the Pnyx he invited the demos to gaze on the gates and recall Salamis. It wasn't only the object of approbation, however, Cicero in his De Officiis 2.60 (citing Demetrios of Phaleron) critiques the financial profligacy of the building.

The first documentary evidence of the Propylaea from the early modern period is Niccolò di Martoni's account of 1395 which indicated that the Beulé Gate was not in use at this point but the entrance to the Acropolis was still through the Propylaea. In the following centuries the only information on the building is from traveller's reports or the diaries of military officers. Attempts to survey the building begin in earnest in the late eighteenth century, notably J.-D. Le Roy's Ruines des plus beaux monuments de la Gréce 1758, and Stuart and Revett's The Antiquities of Athens 1762-1804, but are hampered by the spolia and overbuilding on the structure. Subsequent studies include Bohn's fundamental work Die Propyläen der Akropolis zu Athen 1882 which summarized the knowledge of the building prior to the archaeological discoveries of 1885-1890; Bundgaard's Mnesicles: A Greek Architect at Work 1957, that examined the building's implications for planning practice; Dinsmoor Jr., The Propylaia I: The Predecessors 1980, a careful study of the predecessors of the Propylaea. Since possibly 1975 it has been subject to ongoing restoration work under T. Tanoulas whose work has been published by the Acropolis Restoration Service as Μελέτη αποκαταστάσεως των Προπυλαίων (Study for the Restoration of the Propylaea) 1994.

Perhaps the two most notable examples of the Propylaea's architectural influence are the Greater Propylaea at Eleusis and Langhans's Brandenburg Gate of 1791. The former was a Roman Neo-Attic copy of the Central Hall at Athens from the late second century AD, probably instigated by Hadrian. This was framed by two memorial arches in what was possibly a reference to the wings of the original building. The latter, while an inexact copy, is clearly informed by the Athenian original likely drawing on Le Roy’s work, then the only reference source before the publication of The Antiquities of Athens. Commissioned by the King of Prussia, the Gate inaugurated the Greek Revival in Germany even though the edifice deviated notably from the canonical Doric form; its frieze ends with a half-metope and its columns have bases.

== Bibliography ==
- Bohn, R. (1882). Die Propylaeen der Akropolis zu Athen. Berlin: Spemann. doi:10.11588/diglit.675. Archived from the original on 2022-05-26.
- Bundgaard, J. A. (1957). Mnesicles, a Greek Architect at Work. Copenhagen: Gyldendal.
- Bundgaard, J. A. (1974). The Excavation at the Athenian Acropolis 1882-1890. Copenhagen: Gyldendal.
- De Waele, J. (1990). The Propylaea of the Akropolis in Athens: The Project of Mnesikles. Amsterdam: J C Gieben.
- Dinsmoor, W. B. (1910). "The Gables of the Propylaea at Athens". American Journal of Archaeology. 14 (2): 143–184. doi:10.2307/496827. JSTOR 496827. S2CID 245265318.
- Dinsmoor, W. B. (1950). The Architecture of Ancient Greece. London: B. T. Batsford.
- Dinsmoor, W. B. Jr. (1980). The Propylaia I: The Predecessors. Princeton.
- Dinsmoor, W. B. Jr. (1982). "The Asymmetry of the Pinakotheke—for the Last a Time?". Studies in Athenian Architecture, Sculpture, and Topography Presented to Homer A. Thompson. Hesperia Suppl.
- Dinsmoor, W. B. Jr. (1984). "Preliminary Planning of the Propylaia by Mnesicles". Le dessin d'architecture dans les sociétés antiques. Actes du Colloque de Strasbourg 26-29 Janvier 1984.
- Dinsmoor, William B. & Dinsmoor, William B. Jr. (2004). Dinsmoor, Anastasia Norre (ed.). The Propylaia to the Athenian Akropolis II: The Classical Building. The American School of Classical Studies at Athens.
- Eiteljorg II, Harrison (1993). The Entrance to the Acropolis Before Mnesicles.
- Frantz, A. (1988). The Athenian Agora XXIV, Late Antiquity A.D. 267-700. American School of Classical Studies at Athens.
- Kavvadias, P.; Kawerau, G. (1907). Die Ausgrabung der Akropolis vom Jahre 1885 bis zum Jahre 1890. Archived from the original on 2023-03-14.
- Paga, J. (2021). Building democracy in Late Archaic Athens. Oxford.
- Shear, Ione Mylonas (1999). "The Western Approach to the Athenian Akropolis". The Journal of Hellenic Studies. 119: 86–127. doi:10.2307/632313. JSTOR 632313.
- Shear, T. Leslie Jr. (2016). Trophies of Victory: Public Building in Periklean Athens. Princeton.
- Stevens, G.Ρ. (1936). "The Periclean Entrance Court of the Acropolis of Athens". Hesperia. 5 (4): 443–520. JSTOR 146607.
- Stevens, G.Ρ. (1946). "Architectural Studies Concerning the Acropolis of Athens". Hesperia. 15 (2): 73–106. JSTOR 146883.
- Tanoulas, T. (1987). "The Propylaea of the Acropolis at Athens since the seventeenth century". Jahrbuch des deutschen archäologishen Instituts. 102.
- Tanoulas, T.; Ioannidou, M.; Moraitou, A. (1994). Μελέτη αποκαταστάσεως των Προπυλαίων (PDF) (in Greek). Athens: Committee for the Preservation of the Acropolis Monuments, Ministry of Culture. Archived (PDF) from the original on 2023-12-07.
- Tanoulas, T. (1997). "Τα Προπύλαια της Αθηναϊκής Ακρόπολης κατά τον Μεσαιώνα". Βιβλιοθηκη Της Εν Αθηνας Αρχαιολογικης Εταιρειας (in Greek) (165). Archaeological Society at Athens. Archived from the original on 2024-05-29.
- Travlos, J. (1971). Pictorial Dictionary of Ancient Athens. London: Thames & Hudson. ISBN 978-0-500-05012-5.
- Wright, James C. (1994). "The Mycenaean Entrance System at the West end of the Akropolis of Athens". Hesperia. 63 (3): 323–360. JSTOR 148295. Archived from the original on 2023-03-23.
