= Rachel Meredith Kousser =

Professor of art history at the City University of New York

Rachel Meredith Kousser is professor of art history at the City University of New York.

== Education ==
Kousser earned her B.A at Yale College, double majoring in Classics and Art History in May 1994. During her undergraduate years, she received the Summa cum laude Lati Language Price (1991), the Greek Language Prize (1992), and the Mark Deitz Memorial Prize for original research by an undergraduate in the History of Art. Her senior essay was titled "Death, Art, and Daily Life: An Essay in the Interpretation of Classical Athenian White-ground Lekythoi" J. J. Pollitt advised it. She completed her Ph.D. in Art History at the New York University Institute of Fine Arts. Her May 2001 Dissertation is titled "Sensual Power: A Warrior Aphrodite in Greek and Roman Sculpture" was completed under the advisory of Evelyn Harrison.

== Career ==
Kousser is a professor and Executive Officer in the Art History Department (2015-Present). She has been a member of the Art History Doctoral Faculty since 2007 and the Classics Doctoral Faculty since 2011.

She was previously a professor in the art department of Brooklyn College, a visiting assistant professor in the Department of Classics at Franklin & Marshall College and a postdoctoral fellow and lecturer in the Department of Art History and Archaeology of Columbia University.

== Work ==
=== Books ===
- Alexander at the End of the World: The Forgotten Final Years of Alexander the Great. HarperCollins, 2024.
- The Afterlives of Greek Sculpture: Interaction, Transformation, and Destruction. Cambridge University Press, 2017.

Winner: Archaeological Institute of America Publication Subvention Award, 2015

- Hellenistic and Roman Ideal Sculpture: The Allure of the Classical. Cambridge University Press, 2008 (hardback), 2014 (paperback).

=== Selected other publications ===
- “The Mutilation of the Herms: Violence toward Sculptures in the Late Fifth Century B.C.” In

Margaret M. Miles, ed., Autopsy in Athens: Recent Archaeological Research on Athens and Attica, Oxford: Oxbow Books, 2015, pages 76-84.

- “A Sacred Landscape: The Creation, Maintenance, and Destruction of Religious Space in Roman Germany.” Res: Anthropology and Aesthetics 27/28 (2010): pages 120-139.
- “Destruction and Memory on the Athenian Acropolis.” The Art Bulletin XCI.3 (2009): pages 263-282.
- “Mythological Group Portraits in Antonine Rome: The Performance of Myth.” American Journal Of Archaeology 111.4 (2007): pages 673-691.
- “Creating the past: The Vénus de Milo and the Hellenistic Reception ofClassical Greece.” American Journal of Archaeology 109.2 (2005): pages 227-50.

== Awards and honors ==
- National Endowment for the Humanities Fellowship (2011-12)
- Getty Research Institute Senior Fellowship (2011)
- Center for Hellenic Studies Non-Residential Fellowship (2010-11)
- Center for the Advanced Study of the Visual Arts, Ailsa Mellon Bruce Senior Fellowship (2010)
- Whiting Foundation Fellowship for Outstanding Teaching in the Humanities (2007-08)
- Post-Doctoral Fellowship, Deutsches Archäologisches Institut Berlin (2006)
- PSC-CUNY Research Award, CUNY Research Foundation (2005, 2006, 2008, 2009, 2010, 2013,2014)
- Römisch-Germanisches Zentralmuseum Fellowship, Mainz (2002, 2003)
