= Grandjouan =

Grandjouan is a surname. Notable people with the surname include:

- Clairève Grandjouan (1929–1982), French-born American archaeologist, grand-daughter of Jules Grandjouan
- Jules Grandjouan (1875–1968), French artist, journalist, activist and illustrator for L'Assiette au Beurre
- Fleur Ng'weno, née Grandjouan, naturalist, writer and editor, sister of Clairève Grandjouan and wife of Hilary Ng'weno, Kenyan historian and journalist
