= Athenians Project =

Project about ancient Athens

Athenians Project is a multi-year, ongoing project of compiling, computerizing and studying data about the persons of ancient Athens. By applying modern technology to ancient data, over a 100,000 entries have been digitized and maintained in an Empress Embedded Database for over 30 years. The project is headed by Professor John S. Traill of the University of Toronto in the Classics Department.

The Athenians Project began back in the 1970s to preserve and make searchable the age-faded, handwritten card-files of Dr. Benjamin Dean Meritt. Meritt had written information about the persons of ancient Athens and accumulated the card files over the preceding 40 years. This included data collected by Johannes Kirchner who also lent his work to the field of epigraphy and prosopography of ancient Athens in his book Prosopographia Attica. Published back in 1901, Kirchner's Prosopographia Attica had 15,588 entries, was limited to the pre-Augustan period, and contained only registered Athenian citizens.

Athenians Project data is available in two main parts. The first is a set of hardbound printed volumes titled "Persons of Ancient Athens" of more than 100,000 entries and typeset in ancient Greek. The second is a relational database of Athenians data which is used to search data using a computer in a variety of ways for further study. The Athenians prosopography Project includes Athenian citizens at home and abroad, slaves, resident aliens, and foreigners honored at Athens—all the known men and women of Athens from the beginning of alphabetic writing to the Byzantine period.

Part of the data is made available to anyone via the Website Attica. Website Attica is designed to be complementary to the published volumes of "Persons of Ancient Athens" (PAA). There are currently 21 published volumes of PAA and at least one more was scheduled to be published within the next two years. The Athenians Project is Toronto's designedly complete database of all "Persons of Ancient Athens".

Searches in the Website Attica may be made on about 10,000 names, all within half of volume four, the entirety of volume five, and the first third of volume six of "Persons of Ancient Athens", i.e. names beginning with the letters beta through delta. The possible searches range from selecting every person in a particular Deme or of a specified profession to more sophisticated searches, e.g. to find all Athenians who lived between specified years and/or are related to a certain person and/or are attested in a class of document, etc.

== History ==
The Athenians Project is the lifeblood of Professor Emeritus John Traill, a world-renowned expert and instructor in "Latin and Greek Scientific Terminology" at the University of Toronto. He has published 24 books and edited an additional 5 books on Greek inscriptions, the topography of Athens and Attica, and on the people of ancient Athens. For the last 3 decades he has directed the Athenians Project. At the beginning of the 1980s, Traill, with the support of the University of Toronto, applied for and received a Social Sciences and Humanities Research Council of Canada research grant to use relational database software technology to store the ancient Athenian data. During the next 30 years, over 100,000 entries have been entered as ancient Greek characters and stored using an Empress Embedded Database.

John Traill's project had its origin in the work of Benjamin Dean Meritt to maintain current data on Athenian prosopography. Like Traill, Meritt saw the potential of the computer to make his paper resources at the Institute for Advanced Study dynamic and expandable. By 1972 Traill was at work entering data. Meritt was an emeritus professor of Greek epigraphy at the Institute for Advanced Study at Princeton.

Based on the Meritt card-file at the Institute for Advanced Study at Princeton, "Persons of Ancient Athens" also includes full references with texts to document each biographical fact.

Based originally at Victoria University in the University of Toronto, formerly Victoria College, Athenians Project is now located in the Department of Classics at the University of Toronto.
