= John S. Traill =

Canadian scholar

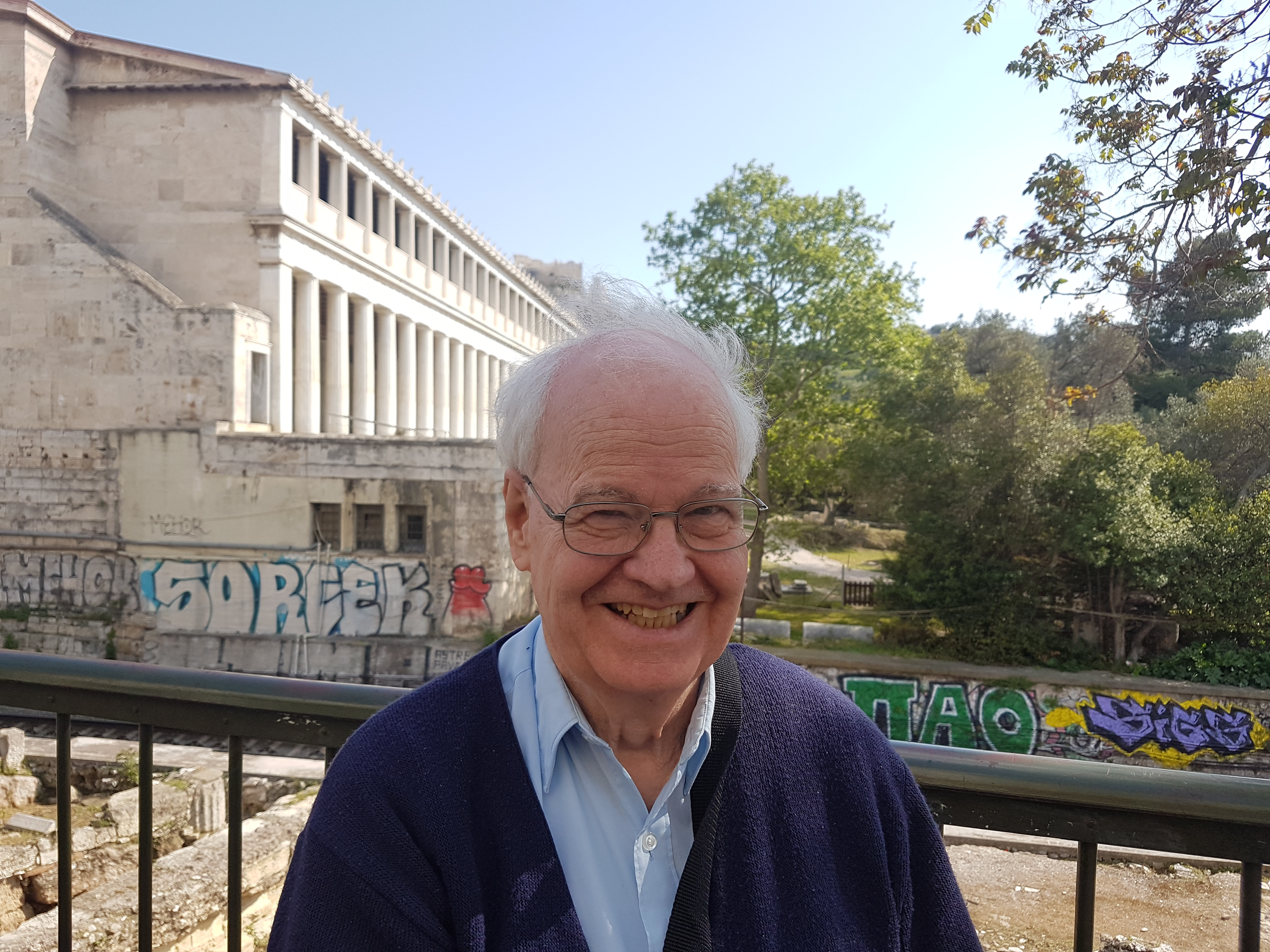
- Traill in 2017
- Born: 1939
- Education: University of Toronto

John Stuart Traill (born 1939) is a Canadian academic, author and founder of the Athenians Project. He is a graduate of the University of Toronto.

== Works ==
- John S. Traill and Benjamin Dean Meritt. Inscriptions: The Athenian Councillors, 1974, ISBN 9780876612156
- John S. Traill. The Political Organization of Attica: A Study of the Demes, Trittyes, and Phylai, and Their Representation in the Athenian Council (Hesperia Supplement), 1975, ISBN 9780876615140
