= William B. Dinsmoor Jr. =

American archaeologist (1923–1988)

William Bell Dinsmoor Jr. (July 2, 1923 – July 7, 1988) was an American classical archaeologist and architectural historian.

== Biography ==
He was born on July 2, 1923, in New York City to William Bell Dinsmoor and Zillah F. Pierce (1886–1960).

Dinsmoor studied at Phillips Exeter Academy and Columbia University, taking time out for active service in the military during World War II in India and China. He received a B.A. in modern languages in 1947 and degrees in architecture: Bachelor’s (1947) and Master’s (1951) from Columbia University.

He married Mary Higgins on September 4, 1948. That marriage produced four children: Margaret Park Dinsmoor, Diane Marie Dinsmoor, William Bell Dinsmoor III, and Robert Davidson Dinsmoor.

In the 1950s, Dinsmoor worked as an architect in Colorado, New Mexico, and El Paso Texas. They divorced on January 7, 1966 in El Paso, Texas. Dinsmoor moved to Greece to assist Lucy Taxis Shoe Meritt with her survey of Greek architectural moulding and Carl Blegen on his books on Troy and Pylos. He subsequently married Anastasia N. Dinsmoor. That marriage produced a son, Paul Dinsmoor.

In the field, Dinsmoor worked with Oscar Broneer and helped publish the finds of the temple of Poseidon in Athens. In 1966, he was appointed architect for the archeological excavations of the Agora in Athens, a position which he held until his death. He received the Gold Medal Award for Distinguished Archaeological Achievement in 1969 from the Archaeological Institute of America.

Dinsmoor's main research focused on the propylaia to the acropolis in Athens, working to study its construction and establish its configuration during various phases. He died on July 7, 1988, in Athens, Greece, aged 65. Dinsmoor's papers are archived in Athens at the American School of Classical Studies.

== Selected works ==
=== Books ===
- 1971. Sounion. ASIN : B00I4W3L7U
- 1980. The Propylaia to the Athenian Akropolis (Volume I, the Predecessors). ISBN 978-0876619407
- 1984. Ancient Athenian Building Methods. ISBN 978-0876616260
- 2004. The Propylaia to the Athenian Akropolis (Volume II, the Classical Building) (with William B. Dinsmoor, Sr., edited by Anastasia Norre Dinsmoor. ISBN 978-0876619414

=== Articles ===
- 1971. “New Parthenon Finds in the Agora,” Athens Annals of Archaeology, vol. 4.
- 1973. “The Kardaki Temple Re-Examined,” Mitteilungen des Deutschen Archäologischen Instituts Athenische Abteilung, vol. 88.
- 1974. “New Fragments of the Parthenon in the Athenian Agora,” Hesperia, vol. 43, No. 1.
- 1974. “The Monopteros in the Athenian Agora,” Hesperia, vol. 43, No. 4.
- 1974. “The Temple of Poseidon: A Missing Sima and Other Matters,” American Journal of Archaeology, vol. 78.
- 1975. “The Baptistery: Its Roofing and Related Problems,” Studies in the Antiquities of Stobi, vol. 2.
- 1976. “The Roof of the Hephaisteion,” American Journal of Archaeology, vol. 80.
- 1977. “The Archaeological Field Staff: The Architect,” Journal of Field Archaeology, vol. 4.
- 1982. “Anchoring Two Floating Temples,” Hesperia, vol. 51, No. 4.
- 1982. “The Asymmetry of the Pinakotheke for the Last Time?” Hesperia, supplement XX.
- 1984. “Preliminary Planning of the Propylaia by Mnesicles,” Le Dessin d’Architecture dans les Sociétés Antiques.

=== Book reviews ===
- 1971. “The Architects of the Parthenon, by Rhys Carpenter,” American Journal of Archaeology, vol. 75.
- 1977. “Wurster, Der Apollontempel,” Gnomon, vol. 49.
