= Lucy Talcott =

American archaeologist (1899–1970)

- Photographed by Alison Frantz at Acrocorinth, c. 1939
- Born: April 10, 1899; Connecticut
- Died: April 10, 1970 (aged 71); Princeton, New Jersey
- Occupation: Classical archaeologist

Academic background
- Education: Radcliffe College; Columbia University

Academic work
- Institutions: American School of Classical Studies at Athens

Lucy Talcott (April 10, 1899 – April 6, 1970) was an American archaeologist who worked on the excavations at the Ancient Agora of Athens for over twenty years. An expert on ancient Greek painted pottery, she coauthored the definitive study of Archaic and Classical household pottery.

== Biography ==
Lucy Talcott was born in 1899 in Connecticut and educated at Radcliffe College, getting her B.A. in 1921. She did her graduate work at Columbia University, from which she received an M.A. She went on to study at the American School of Classical Studies at Athens, Greece.

Talcott began her field work in archaeology in 1930 when she took part in excavations at the ancient Greek city of Corinth. She found that curatorial work was more to her taste than field work, however, and the following year she was made recording secretary of excavations in the Athenian Agora, a position she held for the remainder of the decade. In this capacity, she designed a system for organizing, recording, storing, and cross-referencing the many thousands of objects recovered from the Agora. Her system came to be considered critical to the final success of the project and a model for other excavations. She published her system in Archaeology magazine. One of her assistants during the 1930s was archaeologist Alison Frantz, then just beginning her career.

After a hiatus caused by World War II, Talcott returned to the Athenian Agora excavations in 1947 and stayed for a further 11 years. During this phase, she also managed the local museum.

Talcott became an expert in ancient Greek painted pottery and published her research in the journal Hesperia. With fellow archaeologist Brian A. Sparkes, she wrote the two-volume study Black and Plain Pottery of the 6th, 5th, and 4th Centuries B.C. (1970), which is considered the definitive reference on household pottery of the Archaic and Classical periods. She and Sparkes also co-wrote a popular book, Pots and Pans of Classical Athens (1958).

For her work on the Athenian excavations, Talcott was decorated by King Paul in 1956.

Talcott died of cancer in 1970 in Princeton, New Jersey.
