= Priscilla Capps Hill =

American philanthropist (1900–1985)

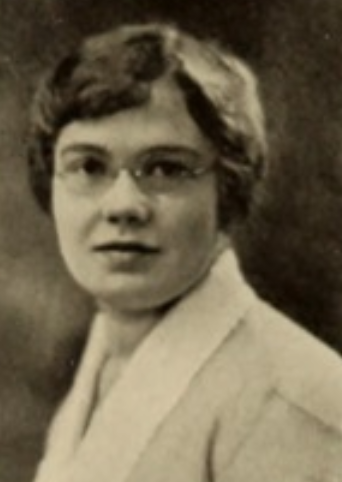
- Priscilla Capps (later Hill), from the 1923 yearbook of Smith College
- Born: February 4, 1900; Chicago, Illinois
- Died: December 1985 (aged 85); Bridgewater, New Jersey
- Occupations: Philanthropist, relief worker
- Parent: Edward Capps

Priscilla Capps Hill (February 4, 1900 – December 12, 1985) was an American philanthropist. As overseas director of Near East Industries in the 1920s, she organized handicraft workshops of refugee women in Athens, Greece, to make traditional embroidered and woven items to sell to tourists, and at Near East Relief charity shops in the United States.

== Early life and education ==
Priscilla Capps was born in Chicago, the daughter of Edward Capps and Grace Alexander Capps. Her mother taught at the Illinois state school for the deaf; her father, a college professor, was an American ambassador in Greece, and president of the American Friends of Greece. She had hearing loss from otosclerosis. She graduated from Smith College, with a break in her studies to assist her father at the American School of Classical Studies at Athens (ASCSA).

Her younger brother Edward Jr. became an art history professor at Oberlin College.

== Career ==
Capps taught biology at Hood College after graduating from Smith. She began the Near East Industries operation in Athens in 1925. She organized an embroidery and weaving workshop in a refugee camp in Athens; the women's finished crafts were sold to tourists and exported to the Near East Relief charity shops in the United States, to raise funds for continuing relief efforts. In time, further workshops followed, and the crafts produced included dolls, clothing, home goods, and bags. On visits to the United States, she gave presentations about her work, describing Greek traditional designs and their regional variations.

With the onset of World War II, Near East Industries began making clothing and medical supplies for new refugees in Greece, and employing the wives and daughters of men gone to military service. She and her husband fled from Greece in 1940, but she continued working for the Greek War Relief Committee in New York.

After the war, she and her husband moved to Paris for his work as vice-president of American Express. She was active in supporting ASCSA in the 1940s and 1950s. In her later years, living in Princeton, New Jersey, she donated her personal collection of Greek embroidered items to the Boston Museum of Fine Arts.

== Personal life ==
Priscilla Capps married diplomat Henry Albert "Harry" Hill in 1933, in Athens. Their son Henry Albert Jr., known as "Larry", was born in Athens in 1939. Her husband died in 1960, and she died in 1985, after several years of memory loss, at the age of 85, in Bridgewater, New Jersey.
