= William Bell Dinsmoor =

American architectural historian and professor (1886–1973)

William Bell Dinsmoor Sr.
- Photographed in later life
- Born: July 29, 1886; Windham, New Hampshire, US
- Died: July 2, 1973 (aged 86); Athens, Greece
- Employer: Columbia University
- Spouses: Zillah Frances Pierce (1910 til her death in 1960), [Unknown Greek woman, first name, Nota, who had been his nurse after the stroke] (til his death in 1973)
- Children: William Bell Dinsmoor Jr., Frances Atheniese Dinsmoor Sandstone

William Bell Dinsmoor Sr. (July 29, 1886 – July 2, 1973) was an American architectural historian of classical Greece and a Columbia University professor of art and archaeology.

== Biography ==
Dinsmoor was born on July 29, 1886, in Windham, New Hampshire.

Dinsmoor graduated from Harvard University with a Bachelor of Science degree (1906). After working in an architectural firm, he joined the American School of Classical Studies in Athens, Greece, in 1908 and became the School's architect in 1912. Dinsmoor joined the faculty of Columbia University in 1919. In 1927–1928 he was the architectural consultant for the construction of the interior of a full-scale concrete replica of the Parthenon in Nashville, Tennessee. He then returned to the American School as a professor of architecture (1924–1928). He was married to Zillah Frances Pierce (1886–1960). During the years in Athens, he wrote his magnum opus, a rewritten edition of the Architecture of Ancient Greece by William James Anderson (1844–1900) and Richard Phené Spiers (1838–1916); it first appeared in 1927 and would go to three editions and be a mainstay for the teaching of Greek architecture through the twentieth century. Dinsmoor was elected to the American Philosophical Society in 1933. In 1934, following the resignation of S. Butler Murray, the Department of Fine Arts at Columbia was reorganized, and Dinsmoor became chairman. He held this position until 1955. During the mid-1930s, Dinsmoor engaged in a celebrated debate on the configuration of the three phases of the Parthenon with the eminent Acropolis scholar Wilhelm Dörpfeld. In 1935, he was named professor of archaeology at Columbia University. Between 1936 and 1946, he was president of the Archaeological Institute of America. During World War II, President Franklin Delano Roosevelt appointed Dinsmoor chair of the Committee for the Protection of Cultural Treasures in War Areas. Dinsmoor was elected to the American Academy of Arts and Sciences in 1944. For much of his career he taught at the American School of Classical Studies in Athens. He retired from Columbia University in 1963. In 1969, he was awarded the gold medal for his archaeological achievements by the Archaeological Institute of America. He died of a stroke while in Athens on July 2, 1973.

== Legacy ==
Dinsmoor's full bibliography is collected in the journal Hesperia.

Dinsmoor is best known for two major works. The first of these is his complete rewriting of The Architecture of Ancient Greece (1927). Although Dinsmoor always allowed much credit for the work to Anderson and Spiers, the revision of the book was essentially a unique accomplishment. The second book is The Archons of Athens in the Hellenistic Age (1931), which attempted to assign absolute dates to the eponymous archons of Hellenistic Athens. The book is fundamental for Athenian chronology.

His son, William Bell Dinsmoor Jr., was also a classical architectural historian.

== Bibliography ==
- Bibliography of William Bell Dinsmoor; Hesperia 35 (1966): 87–92.
- (1st Dinsmoor edition:) Anderson, William J., and Spiers, Richard Phené. The Architecture of Ancient Greece: an Account of its Historic Development, being the First Part of the Architecture of Greece and Rome. 2nd ed. New York: C. Scribner's,1927.
- The Architecture of Ancient Greece: an Account of its Historic Development. 3rd ed. New York: Batsford, 1950.
- Observations on the Hephaisteion. Baltimore: American School of Classical Studies at Athens, 1941.
- The Archons of Athens in the Hellenistic Age. Cambridge, MA: American School of Classical Studies at Athens, Harvard University Press, 1931.
- "An Archaeological Earthquake at Olympia". American Journal of Archaeology 45 (1941) 399–427.
- "Anchoring two floating temples [of the Agora, Athens]." Hesperia 51 (October/December 1982): 410–52.
- "The Burning of the Opisthodomos at Athens. I: The Date". American Journal of Archaeology 36 (1932): 143–172.
- "The Burning of the Opisthodomos at Athens. II: The Site". American Journal of Archaeology 36 (1932): 307–326. [reply, Wilhelm Dörpfeld. "Der Brand des alten Athena-Tempels und seines Opisthodoms. American Journal of Archaeology 38 (April 1934): 249–57; reply, continued, Wilhelm Dörpfeld. "Parthenon I, II und III". American Journal of Archaeology 39 (October 1935): 497–507; [rejoinder by Dinsmoor] "The Older Parthenon, Additional Notes". American Journal of Archaeology 39 (October 1935): 508–9
