= Edward Capps =

American classical philologist and diplomat (1866–1950)

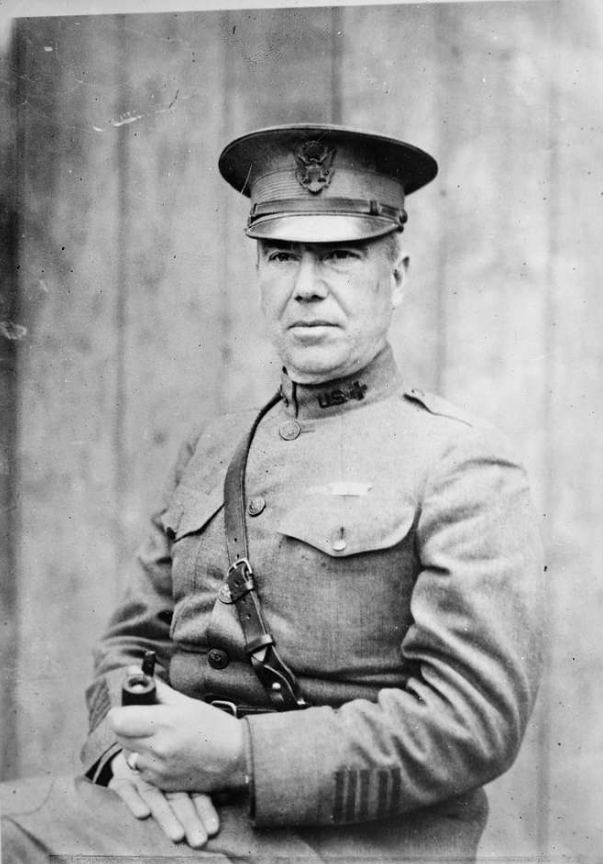

United States Ambassador to Greece
- In office 1920–1920
- Preceded by: Garrett Droppers
- Succeeded by: Irwin Laughlin

President of the Classical Association of the Middle West and South
- In office 1907–1908
- Preceded by: Moses S. Slaughter
- Succeeded by: Arthur T. Walker

Personal details
- Born: December 21, 1866 Jacksonville, Illinois
- Died: August 21, 1950 (aged 83) Princeton, New Jersey
- Occupation: Professor and administrator
- Awards: Order of the Redeemer; Medal of Military Merit

Military service
- Allegiance: United States
- Rank: Colonel

Edward Capps Sr. (December 21, 1866 – August 21, 1950) was an American diplomat, professor of Philology, and colonel.

== Biography ==
Capps was born in Jacksonville, Illinois on December 21, 1866. He would go on to graduate from Illinois College in 1887 and later receive a PhD from Yale in 1891. In July of the following year, he would get married.

In 1890 Capps was appointed tutor at Yale. In 1892 he joined the faculty of the newly founded University of Chicago as professor of Greek language and literature, remaining so until 1907. In 1903 he was special lecturer at Harvard, and during the next two years studied at Athens and Halle. During 1906–7 he was managing editor of Classical Philology, in 1907 was elected president of the Classical Association of the Middle West and South.

Capps began teaching at Princeton in 1907, a position he would hold until his retirement in 1936. As a scholar he was noted for his productivity and received praises from individuals such as Ulrich von Wilamowitz-Moellendorff for his work on classical philology. He also had a notable friendship with President Woodrow Wilson, which helped him gain international prominence, aided even more so by his role as the editor of the first volumes of the Loeb Classical Library.

Capps would also make a name for himself serving on the managing committee of the American School of Classical Studies at Athens (ASCSA) from 1908 to 1950, during which he acted as chair between 1919 and 1939. During his time as chair, ASCSA would purchase the Gennadius Library and the Athenian Agora. He would also personally chair the excavation project of the agora, negotiating the process on behalf of the school and attaining additional funds. These efforts saw the school's endowment increase significantly and earned Capps the nickname of the 'second founder' of the school.

Capps also served as Envoy Extraordinary and Minister Plenipotentiary to both Greece and Montenegro on behalf of the United States in 1920 at the behest of his friend President Wilson. He was elected to the American Philosophical Society that same year.

During the fallout of the Greco-Turkish War, Capps would make a name for himself as a humanitarian by aiding the Greek refugees. Using his position as the American Red Cross Commissioner to Greece and his rank as a colonel, his efforts would see success and result in the Greek government awarding him both the Order of the Redeemer and the Medal of Military Merit.

Capps died on August 21, 1950, in Princeton, New Jersey.

== Legacy ==
In honor of his contributions to the school, the ASCSA built the Edward Capps Belvedere overlooking the Athenian Agora from the Agoraios Kolonos and launched the Edward Capps Society to honor individuals who provide for the future of the school.

Capps's alma mater of Illinois College would also honor his legacy by establishing the 'Edward Capps Professorship of Humanities.'

Capps's daughter Priscilla Capps Hill was director of Near East Industries in Athens, and longtime supporter of ASCSA. His son, Edward Capps Jr. taught art history at Oberlin College.
