= Brian A. Sparkes =

British classical archaeologist (born 1933)

Brian Sparkes
- Born: 16 May 1933 (age 91)
- Children: 1 son and daughter

Brian A. Sparkes (born 16 May 1933) is a British classical archaeologist and art historian, specialising in the art of ancient Greece. For most of his academic career, he has been based at The University of Southampton, where he was professor of classical archaeology, and helped to found the department of archaeology.

== Early life ==
Sparkes was brought up in Sheffield and attended King Edward VII School from 1944 to 1952. He took a Classics degree at King's College London and was awarded first class honours in 1955. During those years, he was one of the chief instigators for performing Greek plays in the original Greek and himself played Hippolytus in the first production. The tradition started in 1953 continues to this day.

== Career ==
From 1955 to 1957, he studied for a PhD (on Aristophanes and his Athenian background) that took him to Greece and gained him a School Studentship at the British School of Archaeology. In Athens, he studied ceramic material in the Athenian Agora and as a consequence of this connection he was awarded a two-year studentship at The American School of Classical Studies to start in 1957. This connection led to the direction of his academic work for the next ten years.

In the autumn of 1958, he was appointed as an assistant lecturer at Southampton University, where he stayed from the rest of his career until the 1990s when he retired as a Professor of Classical Archaeology, moving in the 1980s from the Classics Department to the Department of Archaeology which he had helped to establish. He chaired various committees in the University and in the 1990s became Public Orator.

During his early years in Southampton, he travelled annually to Athens to continue his work in the Athenian Agora. He was awarded an Herodotus Fellowship at Princeton Institute of Advanced Study for 1962–1963 to work with Lucy Talcott on classical Athenian plain wares. The result of this investigation was published in 1970.

In 1964, he was appointed the editor of The Journal of Hellenic Studies and Archaeological Reports, a position he held until 1971. From 2000–2005, he was chairman of the managing Committee of the Primary Latin Project.

Over the years he held the Geddes-Harrower Visiting Professorship in Aberdeen, the First Leventis Visiting Professorship at the University of Edinburgh, and was the president of the Joint Association of Classical Teachers and the president of the Classical Association.

During his 40 years of teaching and research, he gave lectures at many universities and schools in Britain and abroad: New York, Sydney, Melbourne, Christchurch, Cincinnati, Tampa, North Carolina (Duke), the Getty in Los Angeles, St Petersburg.

In 2004, he was honoured with a Festschrift entitled ‘Greek Art in View’, edited by Simon Keay and Stephanie Moser. (Oxbow Books).

== Personal life ==
Brian has been married to Diana (née Foss) since 1959. They have two children, Philip and Catherine, and three grandsons, Wilkie, Matthew, and Oliver.

== Selected book publications ==
- (with Lucy Talcott) Pots and Pans of Classical Athens, Princeton, 1959
- (with Lucy Talcott) Black and Plain Pottery, The Athenian Agora vol. 12, 2 vols, Princeton, 1970
- (edited with Donna C. Kurtz) The Eye of Greece: Studies in the Art of Athens, CUP, 1982
- So Few People Look Like Themselves, Southampton University, 1988
- Greek Art, (New Surveys in the Classics no. 22), OUP, 1991
- Greek Pottery: An Introduction, Manchester University Press, 1991
- The Red and the Black: Studies in Greek Pottery, Routledge, 1996
- (editor) Greek Civilization: an Introduction, Blackwell, 2000
- (with Keith Rutter) Word and Image in Ancient Greece, Edinburgh University Press, 2000
- (with Edward Bispham and Tom Harrison) Edinburgh Companion to Ancient Greece and Rome, Edinburgh University Press, 2006
- Greek Art, (New Surveys in the Classics no. 40), CUP, 2011

== Selected journal articles ==
- ‘The Greek Kitchen’ in The Journal of Hellenic Studies 82 1962), pp. 121–137
- ‘The Taste of a Boeotian Pig’ in The Journal of Hellenic Studies 87 (1967), pp. 116–130
- ‘Black Perseus’ in Antike Kunst 11 (1968), pp. 3–16
- ‘Illustrating Aristophanes’ in The Journal of Hellenic Studies 95 (1975), pp. 122–135
- ‘Treading the Grapes’ in Bulletin Antieke Beschaving 51 (1977), pp. 47–84
- ‘Quintain and the Talcott Class’ in Antike Kunst 20 (1977), pp. 8–25
- ‘Greek Bronzes’, in Greece and Rome 34 (1987), pp. 152–168
- ‘Classical Associations and Societies in the United Kingdom’ in Hyperboreus, 19 (2013), pp. 205–213
