= Robert D. Lamberton =

American classical scholar

Robert Drummond Lamberton is a classics scholar, poet, and translator of ancient and contemporary literature, most notably Maurice Blanchot's Thomas the Obscure. He is currently professor emeritus in the Classics Department at Washington University in St. Louis. Lamberton was born in Providence, Rhode Island and graduated in 1964 from Harvard College magna cum laude with a degree in Romance languages and literature. He has a master's (1970) and a doctoral degree in comparative literature from Yale University (1979), and has taught at Columbia, Princeton, and Cornell universities. He has written eight books.
