= Susan I. Rotroff =

Archaeologist and classicist

Susan Irene Rotroff FSA
- Occupation: Archaeologist
- Awards: Aristeia Award (2020)

Academic background
- Education: Princeton University
- Thesis: (1976)

Academic work
- Institutions: Washington University in St. Louis
- Main interests: Classical archaeology, Classics, Ancient Greek art, Ancient Greek pottery

Susan Irene Rotroff is an American classical archaeologist, classicist, and academic, specialising in the art, archaeology, and pottery of Ancient Greece. She was Jarvis Thurston and Mona Van Duyn Professor in the Humanities, at Washington University in St. Louis.

== Early life and education ==
Rotroff studied for her Bachelor of Arts (AB) degree at Bryn Mawr College. Following graduation, she studied for one year at the American School of Classical Studies at Athens. She graduated from Princeton University, with a PhD in 1976.

== Academic career ==
In 1995, Rotroff joined the faculty of the Classics Department at Washington University in St. Louis.

== Honours ==
In 1988, she was awarded a fellowship by the MacArthur Fellows Program. In 2011 Rotroff was awarded the Gold Medal from the Archaeological Institute of America On 10 March 2016, she was elected a Fellow of the Society of Antiquaries of London (FSA).

== Works ==
- The Athenian Agora XXXIII, Hellenistic Pottery: The Plain Wares, ASCSA, 2006, ISBN 978-0-87661-233-0
- The Athenian Agora XXIX, Hellenistic Pottery: Athenian and Imported Wheelmade Tableware. Princeton 1997.
- The Romanization of Athens: proceedings of an international conference held at Lincoln, Nebraska (April 1996) Editors Michael C. Hoff, Susan I. Rotroff, Oxbow Books, 1997, ISBN 978-1-900188-51-7
- Debris from a Public Dining Room in the Athenian Agora. Hesperia, Supplement 25, Authors Susan I. Rotroff, John Howard Oakley, ASCSA, 1992, ISBN 978-0-87661-525-6
- Sardis Monograph 12: The Hellenistic Pottery from Sardis, Authors Susan I. Rotroff, Andrew Oliver, Ilse Hanfmann, George Maxim Anossov Hanfmann, Archaeological Exploration of Sardis, 2003, ISBN 978-0-674-01461-9
- Hellenistic relief molds from the Athenian Agora, Volume 23 of Hesperia Supplement, Authors Clairève Grandjouan, Eileen Markson, Susan I. Rotroff, ASCSA, 1989, ISBN 9780876615232
- "Three Centuries of Hellenistic Terracottas", Hellenistic pottery and terracottas, Editors Homer A. Thompson, Dorothy Burr Thompson, Susan I. Rotroff, ASCSA, 1987, ISBN 978-0-87661-944-5
- Hellenistic pottery: Athenian and imported moldmade bowls, Volume 22 of Athenian Agora, American School of Classical Studies at Athens, 1982, ISBN 978-0-87661-222-4
- Women in the Athenian Agora, Authors Susan I. Rotroff, Robert Lamberton, ASCSA, 2006, ISBN 978-0-87661-644-4
- Megarian bowls in the Athenian agora, Princeton., 1975
