= Mabel Lang =

American archaeologist and classical scholar (1917–2010)

- Born: November 12, 1917
- Died: July 21, 2010 (aged 92)
- Education: Columbia University; Bryn Mawr College
- Scientific career
- Fields: Classical Greek archaeology
- Workplaces: Bryn Mawr College

Mabel Louise Lang (November 12, 1917 – July 21, 2010) was an American archaeologist and scholar of Classical Greek and Mycenaean culture.

== Biography ==
Lang took her first degree at Cornell University in 1939 and was awarded her PhD at Bryn Mawr College in 1943, when she also joined the faculty of the college. She was a faculty member there until 1991 and professor emerita until her death. She was appointed as Paul Shorey Professor of Greek in 1971. That same year, she was elected to the American Philosophical Society. In 1981 she was elected a Fellow of the American Academy of Arts and Sciences.

She was the author of several books on Classical Greek law and culture, and was a contributor to the deciphering of the Linear B inscriptions found at Pylos. She was also the first, in 1969, to attempt to interpret the patterns on the painted floors of the megaron at Pylos, suggesting that the designs represented different types of stone. As well as her publications on the Bronze Age frescoes and Linear B tablets at Pylos, she also wrote works on the Greek historiographers Herodotus and Thucydides, and on the excavations of the Athenian Agora with the American School of Classical Studies at Athens, on which she worked as an archaeologist. In 1982 she delivered the Martin Classical Lectures at Oberlin College, and these were later published as Herodotean Narrative and Discourse.

The body of unfinished work which she left at her death was published posthumously by her colleagues in 2011 as Thucydidean Narrative and Discourse.

A memorial for her was held at Bryn Mawr College on April 3, 2011.

== Selected works ==
- The Athenian Citizen (1960, revised 2004 by John McK. Camp II). Princeton, N.J.: American School of Classical Studies at Athens.
- The Athenian Agora Volume x: Athenian Weights, Measures, and Tokens (1964, with Margaret Crosby) Princeton, N.J.: American School of Classical Studies at Athens.
- The Palace of Nestor at Pylos in Western Messenia: Vol. II, The Frescoes (1966). Princeton, N.J.: Princeton University Press for the University of Cincinnati.
- Waterworks in the Athenian Agora (1968). American School of Classical Studies at Athens.
- Graffiti in the Athenian Agora (1974, revised 1988). Oxford: Oxbow Books.
- The Athenian Agora Volume xxi: Graffiti and Dipinti (1975). American School of Classical Studies at Athens.
- Cure and Cult in Ancient Corinth : A Guide to the Asklepieion (1977) Meriden, Conn: Meriden Gravure.
- Socrates in the Agora (1978). Princeton, N.J.: American School of Classical Studies at Athens.
- Herodotean Narrative and Discourse (1984). Cambridge, Mass: Harvard University Press.
- The Athenian Agora Volume xxv: Ostraka (1990). American School of Classical Studies at Athens.
- Life, Death and Litigation in the Athenian Agora (1994). Oxford: Oxbow Books.
- Thucydidean Narrative and Discourse (2011). (Mabel Lang, edited by Jeffrey S. Rusten and Richard Hamilton) Ann Arbor: Michigan Classical Press.
