= Aristotelis Zachos =

Greek architect and restorer (1871–1939)

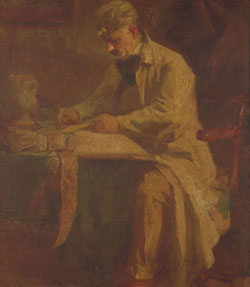
Portrait of Aristotelis Zachos by Evangelos Ioannidis, 1930

Aristotelis Zachos (Greek: Αριστοτέλης Ζάχος; 1871–1939) was a Greek architect.

== Biography ==
Zachos was born in Kastoria, Ottoman Empire in 1871 to a family originally from Siatista. He moved to Veles as a child and later attended high school in Bitola. He moved to Germany to study architecture, returning to Greece in 1897 to serve as a volunteer in the Greco-Turkish War. He moved back to Germany, settling in Karlsruhe where he continued his architectural studies. He returned to Greece permanently in 1905.

== Career ==
In 1913, he was involved in drawing up the urban plan of Thessaloniki and from 1915 to 1917 he worked for the Municipality of Athens. During the same period, he was also involved in the urban plans of Tripoli and Mytilini.

He converted a building in Athens to house the Byzantine Museum. He was in charge of the reconstruction of the church of St. Demetrios in Thessaloniki after a 1917 fire.

In 1911, he published a manifesto, Popular Architecture, that promoted a Greek vernacular architecture or par with Greek poetry and other arts. His early works were designed in a conscious "return to our roots" style that included Byzantine Revival buildings such as the cathedral of Agios Nikolaos, the church of Agios Konstantinos, the church of the Transfiguration of the Saviour (all in Volos).

He also blended traditional architecture with contemporary trends in modernism, such as with his Cathedral of the Apostle Paul in Corinth and the Haztimichali House in Plaka. His last works were largely modernist in nature, influenced by the Bauhaus movement.

He died in Athens in 1939.
