= Evelyn Byrd Harrison =

American art historian

Evelyn Byrd Harrison (June 5, 1920 – November 3, 2012) was an American classical scholar and archaeologist. She was Edith Kitzmiller Professor of the History of Fine Arts at the Institute of Fine Arts of New York University and was for more than 60 years associated with the American School of Classical Studies at Athens. Harrison specialized in 5th century B.C. Athenian sculpture.

== Biography ==
Born in Charlottesville, Virginia, Harrison was a member of both the Byrd and Harrison families of Virginia. She attended John Marshall High School in Richmond, Virginia. In 1941 she graduated from Barnard College with an A.B. and received her M.A. in 1943 from Columbia University. Further studies were postponed by World War II. Harrison worked for the War Department deciphering Japanese codes.

In 1949, she began her affiliation with the American School of Classical Studies at Athens, a relationship that lasted until her death. She joined the faculty of the University of Cincinnati in 1951 and received her Ph.D from Columbia in 1952. Harrison joined the faculty of Columbia in 1955 and remained there until moving to Princeton University in 1970. At Princeton she became the first female full professor in the Department of Art History and Archaeology. She became Edith Kitzmiller Professor of the History of Fine Arts at New York University in 1974 where she remained until retirement in 2006. Harrison died in New York City on November 3, 2012.

== Awards and honors ==
- Guggenheim Fellow (1954)
- Fellow of the American Academy of Arts and Sciences (1973)
- Member of the American Philosophical Society (1979)
- Gold Medal Award for Distinguished Archaeological Achievement (1992)

== Selected bibliography ==
- Ancient portraits from the Athenian Agora, 1960
- Archaic and archaistic sculpture, 1965
- The Athenian Agora : results of excavations conducted by the American school of classical studies at Athens, 1965
- Portrait sculpture, 1961
- The Constantinian portrait, 1967
