= Lucy Shoe Meritt =

American archaeologist

- Photographed aged 16, while a student at the Philadelphia High School for Girls, c. 1922
- Born: August 7, 1906; Camden, New Jersey, US
- Died: April 13, 2003 (aged 96); Austin, Texas, US
- Spouse: Benjamin Dean Meritt (m. 1964; died 1989)
- Awards: Gold Medal Award for Distinguished Archaeological Achievement

Academic background
- Education: American School of Classical Studies
- Alma mater: Bryn Mawr College (AB, MA, PhD)

Academic work
- Discipline: Classical archaeology
- Institutions: Mount Holyoke College; American School of Classical Studies in Athens; University of Texas at Austin

Lucy Taxis Shoe Meritt (August 7, 1906, in Camden, New Jersey – Austin, Texas, April 13, 2003) was an American classical archaeologist and a scholar of Greek architectural ornamentation and mouldings.

== Biography ==
Born in Camden, New Jersey, Lucy Shoe Meritt was the daughter of William Napoleon Shoe and Mary Esther Dunning Shoe. She studied at Bryn Mawr College (A.B. 1927, M.A. 1928, Ph.D. 1935). She continued her studies at the American School of Classical Studies in Athens from 1929 to 1934. From 1937 to 1950 Meritt taught at Mount Holyoke College. She was twice a fellow of the American Academy in Rome (1937 and 1950). She married Benjamin Dean Meritt at Princeton, New Jersey, on November 2, 1964. She worked at the Roman site of Cosa and at Serra Orlando (Morgantina) in Sicily. She served as editor of publications for the American School of Classical Studies in Athens from 1950 until 1972. In 1972, with her husband, Benjamin Dean Meritt's appointment to a professorship at the University of Texas at Austin, she moved to Austin, Texas, and was a visiting scholar at the University of Texas at Austin from 1973 until her death. Meritt received the Gold Medal Award for Distinguished Archaeological Achievement in 1977 from the Archaeological Institute of America.

Lucy Taxis Shoe Meritt died in Austin, Texas, and was buried at Austin Memorial Park Cemetery. The papers and scholarly archive of Lucy Shoe Meritt are preserved as a collection curated by the Alexander Architectural Archives, University of Texas Libraries, University of Texas at Austin.

== Publications ==
- Profiles of Greek Mouldings (1936).
- Profiles of Western Greek Mouldings (1952).
- Etruscan and Roman Republican Mouldings (1965).
- History of the American School of Classical Studies at Athens, 1939-1980 (1984)
- Etruscan and Republican Roman Mouldings (expanded ed., 2000) with Ingrid Edlund-Berry.
