= Benjamin Dean Meritt =

American classical scholar and epigraphist (1899–1989)

Benjamin Dean Meritt (March 31, 1899 in Durham, North Carolina – July 7, 1989 in Austin, Texas) was a classical scholar, professor and epigraphist of ancient Greece. He was the older son of Arthur Herbert Meritt, a professor of Greek and Latin at Trinity College (later Duke University). His younger brother Herbert Dean Meritt was a professor of English philology at Stanford University.

Meritt was educated at Hamilton College (B.A. 1920) and Princeton University (M.A. 1923, Ph.D. 1924). He was an assistant director of the American School of Classical Studies at Athens, is notable for his development of the Athenian Tribute Lists and worked extensively on Athenian calendaring.

Meritt taught at a number of universities including University of Vermont, Brown University, University of Michigan, Princeton University and the American School of Classical Studies in Athens. In 1935 he became a member of the faculty at the Institute for Advanced Study, a position he would hold until his retirement. That same year, he was elected to the American Academy of Arts and Sciences. He was elected to the American Philosophical Society in 1938. In 1972, he moved with his wife, Lucy Shoe Meritt, to the University of Texas at Austin as a visiting professor. The following year she became a visiting professor as well.

== Selected bibliography ==
1. Benjamin Dean Meritt, H. T. Wade-Gery, and Malcolm Francis McGregor. 1939–1953. The Athenian tribute lists. 4 vol. Cambridge, Mass., Harvard University Press.
2. Benjamin Dean Meritt and John S. Traill. 1974. Inscriptions: the Athenian councillors. Princeton, N.J.: American School of Classical Studies at Athens.
