= Clairève Grandjouan =

French American archeologist

Clairève or Claireve Grandjouan (10 October 1929 – 1982) was a French-born American archaeologist.

She had a B.A. and Ph.D. from Bryn Mawr College. After working on excavations in Athens, she became General Secretary of the Archaeological Institute of America (1962–1968) and editor of its Bulletin, while teaching at New York University (1963–1968). She then taught at Hunter College from 1968, becoming chairman of classical and Oriental studies in 1968 and full professor in 1981.

She frequently spoke in public, described as "Stimulating, amusing, and well informed on a wide variety of area studies" and "a consummate educator".

She was a lively personality, and wrote fiction as well as academic papers, including a spoof entitled "The Dormouse Caper" which is described as showing her views on "teaching, scholarship and life".

== Selected publications ==
- Grandjouan, Clairève (1961). Plastic Lamps and Terracottas of the Roman Period. Princeton: American School of Classical Studies. ISBN 9780876612064.
- Grandjouan, Clairève (1989). Hellenistic Relief Molds from the Athenian Agora. Princeton: American School of Classical Studies. ISBN 9780876615232. "Clairève Grandjouan."(completed by Eileen Markson and Susan I. Rotroff)
