= John Travlos =

Greek architect (1908–1985)

- Ιωάννης Τραυλός
- Photographed c. 1952 – c. 1955
- Born: 1908; Rostov-on-Don, Russian Empire
- Died: October 28, 1985 (aged 76–77); Athens, Greece
- Occupations: Archaeologist; Architect

Academic background
- Education: National Technical University of Athens
- Influences: Anastasios Orlandos

John Travlos (Greek: Ιωάννης Τραυλός, romanized: Iōannēs Travlos; Rostov-on-Don 1908 – Athens, October 28, 1985) was a Greek architect, architectural historian, and archaeologist known especially for his work at Athens in the agora of the ancient city. He is the architect that restored the Stoa of Attalos in Athens (1952-1956).

== Personal life ==
Travlos, although born in Russia, was the son of Greeks from Naxos. His family relocated to Athens in 1912, when Travlos was four. He studied there at the National Technical University of Athens in the School of Architecture, receiving his degree in 1931 and his doctorate in 1955. Anastasios Orlandos was an important influence on Travlos.

== Career ==
He became the architect of the Athenian Agora excavations carried out by the American School of Classical Studies at Athens in 1935 and was architect of the school from 1940 until 1973. He produced many influential phase plans and drawings of Athens' history from ca. 3500 BC up to contemporary times. He also did important work at the Eleusinion sanctuary of Demeter in Athens, and also at the sanctuary of Demeter in Eleusis, in collaboration with the excavations conducted by Greek archaeologist George E. Mylonas.

He conducted fieldwork around Greece, including at Eleusis, Isthmia, Corinth, Eretria, and Megara and also carried out further work at Olynthus and Vergina in northern Greece, as well as in Cyprus.

Among his major works, his 1960 treatise on the history of the urban development of Athens and his pictorial dictionary of Athens are the most influential.

== Publications ==
- 1949. “The Topography of Eleusis.” In Hesperia 18 (1949): 138-147.
- 1960. Poleodomikē exelixis tōn Athēnon : apo tōn proïstorikōn chronōn mechri tōn archōn tou 19ou aiōnos (The Urban Development of Athens). Athens.WorldCat
- 1970. "Eleusis: The Origins of the Sanctuary." In Temples and Sanctuaries of Ancient Greece: A Companion Guide. ed. Evi Melas. London: Thames and Hudson, 1970: 75-87.
- 1971. Pictorial dictionary of ancient Athens. New York: Praeger.WorldCat
- 1988. Bildlexikon zur Topographie des antiken Attika. Tübingen: Wasmuth.WorldCat

== Necrology ==
- H. A. Thompson. "John Travlos, 1908-1985." American Journal of Archaeology 90.3 (Jul., 1986) 343-345.
