= Charles Ross =

Charles Ross may refer to:

== Military and politics ==
- Charles Ross (British Army officer, born 1667) (1667–1732), Scottish general and MP
- Charles Ross (Ross-shire MP, born 1721) (1721–1745), Scottish soldier and MP
- Charles Ross (Royal Navy officer) (1776–1849)
- Charles Ross (MP for Northampton) (1799–1860), British member of parliament for Orford, St Germans and Northampton
- Charles N. Ross (c. 1842–?), New York state treasurer
- Charles Campbell Ross (1849–1920), British politician and banker
- Charles Ross (British Army officer, born 1864) (1864–1930), First World War divisional commander
- Sir Charles Lockhart-Ross, 7th Baronet (c. 1763–1814), Scottish landowner, politician, and British Army officer
- Sir Charles Lockhart-Ross, 8th Baronet, son of Sir Charles Lockhart-Ross, 7th Baronet and father of Sir Charles Ross, 9th Baronet
- Sir Charles Ross, 9th Baronet (1872–1942), inventor of the Ross rifle, used by the Canadian army during World War I
- C. Ben Ross (1876–1946), governor of Idaho
- Charles G. Ross (SAAF officer) (1892–?), South African World War I flying ace
- Charlie Ross (Mississippi politician) (born 1956), American politician and attorney
- Charles Ross (Washington politician), politician from the US state of Washington
- Charles Cathmer Ross (1884–1938), provincial politician from Alberta, Canada
- Charles Henderson Ross (1864–1919), Scottish businessman and member of the Legislative Council of Hong Kong

== Other people ==
- Karl Ross (1816–1858), German painter born and sometimes known as Charles.
- Charles Henry Ross (1835–1897), British cartoonist
- Charles J. Ross (1859–1918), Canadian-born American vaudeville entertainer
- Charles Brewster "Charley" Ross (1870–?), American missing person case in the 1870s
- Charles Ross (Australian cricketer) (1863–1935)
- Charles Ross (sportsman) (1852–1911), English cricketer and tennis player
- Charlie Ross (journalist) (1885–1950), American journalist and White House Press Secretary
- Charles Ross (historian) (1924–1986), English historian, biographer of Edward IV and Richard III
- Charles Ross (artist) (born 1937), American sculptor
- Charlie Ross (footballer) (1878–1969), Australian rules footballer
- Charlie Ross (singer), bassist with Eternity's Children, pop and country singer
- Charlie Ross (antiques expert) (born 1946), British antiques expert and auctioneer
- Charles Stanley Ross, American literary scholar, academic, and author
- Charles Ross (1934–2022), astronomy benefactor after whom the asteroid 25944 Charlesross is named
- Charles Ross (YouTuber) (born 1994), American entertainer
- Charles Ross (American football) (1924–2007), American collegiate athletics coach

== See also ==
- Charles Lockhart-Ross (disambiguation)
- Charlie Rose (disambiguation)
