= Arcesine (Karpathos) =

Coordinates: 35°28′45″N 27°07′13″E

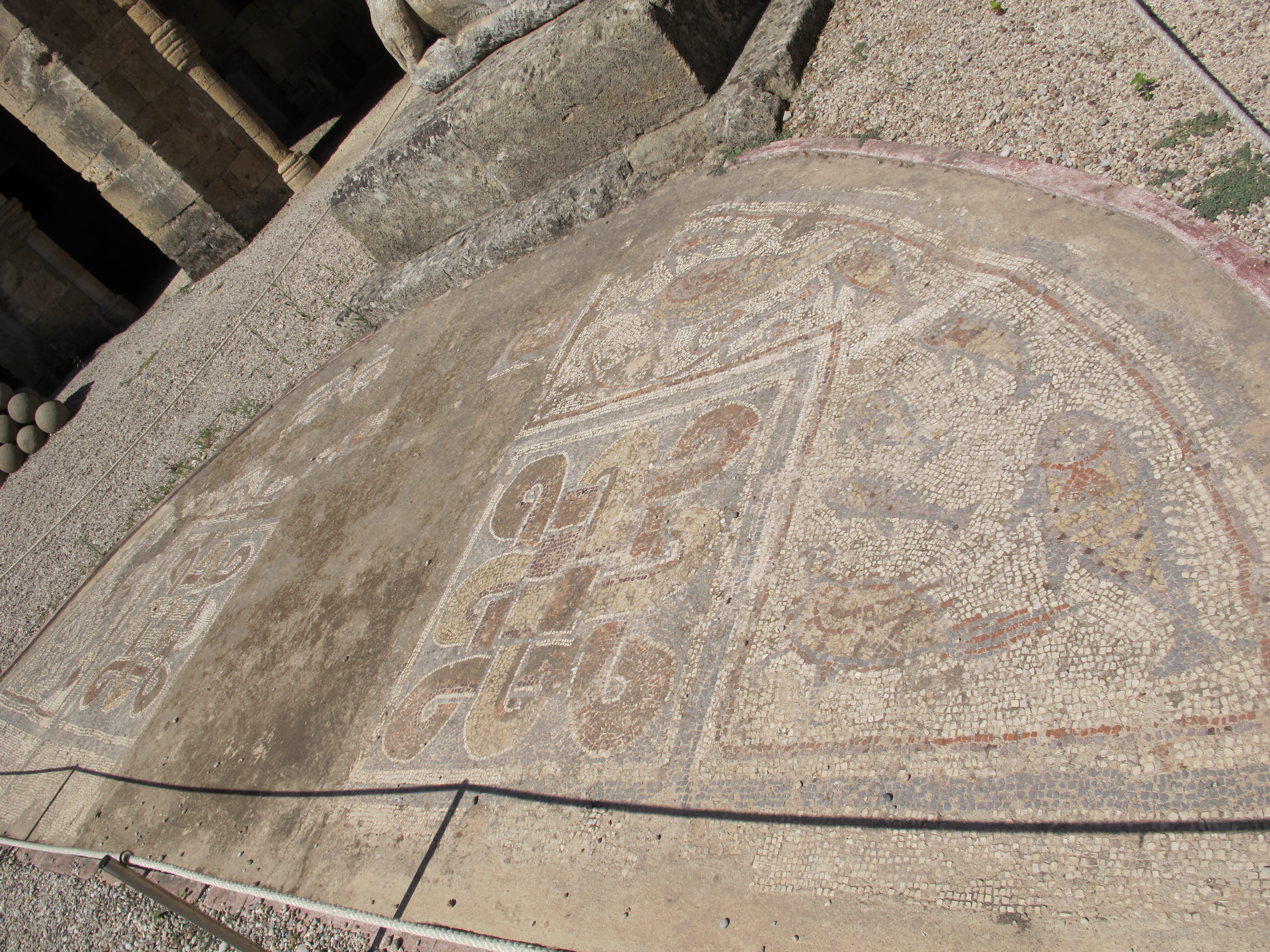
Mosaic from the early church dating from the 4th or 5th century

Arcesine or Arkesine (Ancient Greek: Ἀρκεσίνη), also known as Arceseia or Arkeseia (Ἀρκέσεια or Ἀρκέσσεια), was a town of ancient Greece on the island of Karpathos. Its name is only preserved in an inscription containing the tribute of the Delian League. The site of Arcesine was identified by Ludwig Ross as the modern Arkasa, situated upon a promontory in the middle of the west coast of the southern part of the island.
