= Charley Ross =

Charley Ross may refer to:

- Charles J. Ross (1859–1918), American actor, vaudeville entertainer, and producer often referred to in publications as Charley Ross
- Charley Ross (1870–unknown), American child who disappeared on July 1, 1874

== See also ==
- Charles Ross (disambiguation)
