= Karl Ross =

German painter (1816–1858)

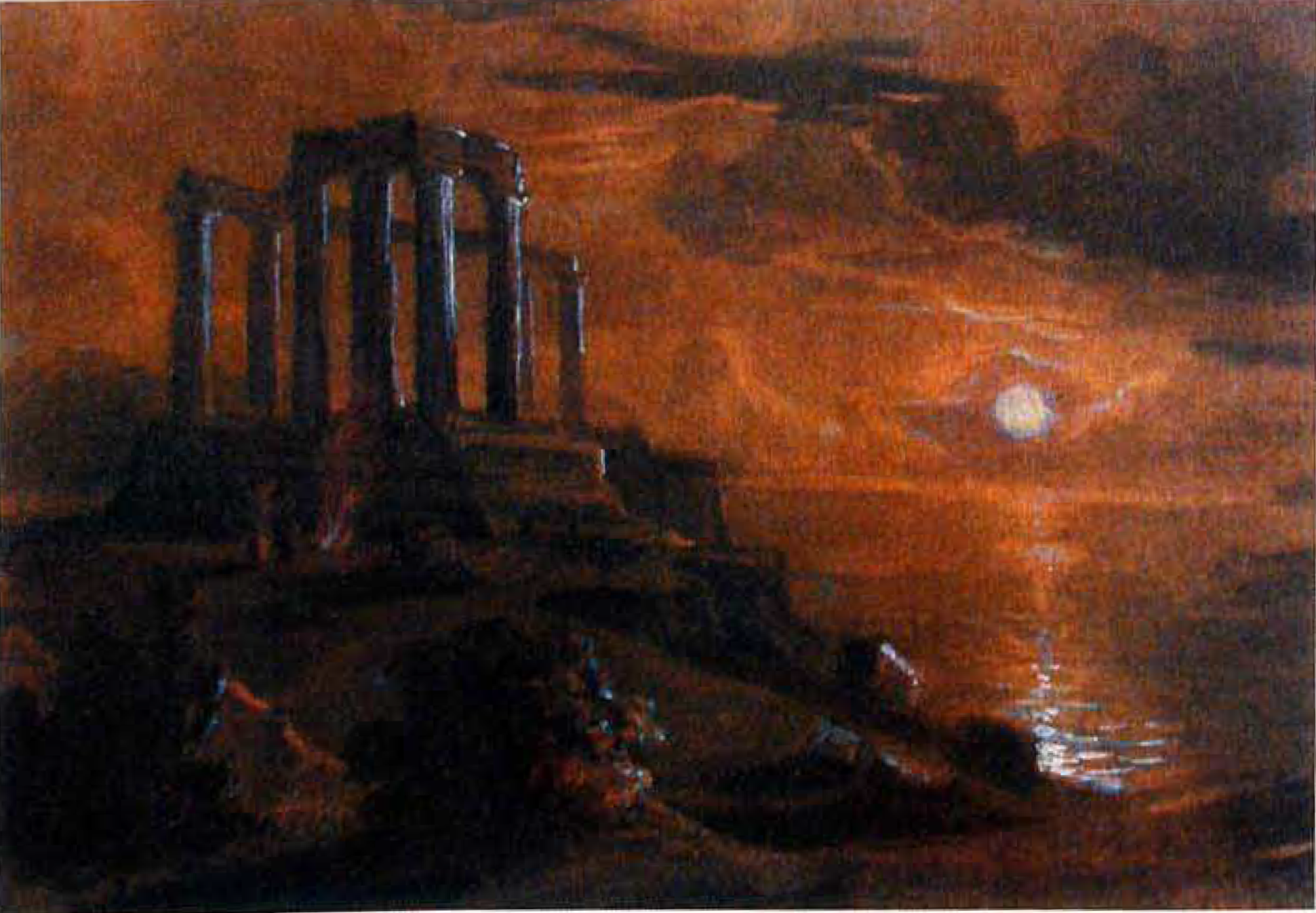
- Painting of the Temple of Poseidon at Cape Sounion by Ross, c. 1840.
- Born: Charles Ross; November 15, 1816; Ruhwinkel, Duchy of Holstein
- Died: February 5, 1858 (aged 41); Munich
- Resting place: Bornhöved
- Education: Royal Danish Academy of Fine Arts, Copenhagen, Denmark
- Known for: Landscape painting
- Notable work: Das Thal des Eurotas mit dem Taygetos (1845); Naxos (1855); Mondnacht am Cap Sunium mit Ruinen des Minervatempels (1855); Ansicht der Grotte und des Hains der Nymphe Egeria bei Rom (1856); Der Tempel von Phigalia in Arkadien (1858)
- Spouse: Helene Abendroth (m. 1847)

Karl Ross (15 November 1816 – 5 February 1858) (also known as Charles) was a German painter. He is most known for his paintings of classical landscapes. He was the brother of the classical archaeologist Ludwig Ross, and executed several of his paintings during travels with Ludwig and other companions throughout Greece.

Ross was a citizen of the Duchy of Holstein, ruled by Denmark. He was trained at the Royal Danish Academy of Fine Arts, where he was academically distinguished, and later travelled for further study to Munich, Rome and Paris. He briefly took a political role as a representative of the revolutionary government of Schleswig, Holstein and Lauenberg during their attempted rebellion against Danish rule in 1848. Affected by ill health for most of his life, he died of typhus in Munich in 1858.

== Biography ==
Ross was born in Ruhwinkel, Holstein, then ruled by the Kingdom of Denmark. His paternal grandfather, a doctor, had moved from northern Scotland to Hamburg around 1750; his father, Colin Ross, married Juliane Auguste Remin and moved in 1810 to the Gut Altekoppel estate in Bornhöved, which he managed and later acquired. Karl Ross was the brother of Ludwig Ross, the classical archaeologist and Ephor General of Archaeology of Greece.

In 1832, Ross travelled to Copenhagen, where he studied at the Royal Danish Academy of Fine Arts until 1834. Among his teachers were Johan Ludwig Lund and Christoffer Wilhelm Eckersberg. He was awarded an academic prize while at the academy, and sold several oil paintings to prince Christian Frederick, the future Christian VIII.

Ross's elder brother, Ludwig, who was then head of the Greek Archaeological Service, invited him to Greece in 1837. Throughout 1837–1839, he travelled through Greece, variously with his brother Ludwig and other central-European expatriates. He made a journey through Attica to Marathon in 1837 with Ludwig and Ernst Curtius, the future excavator of Olympia. He also stayed with Adolf von Shack near Sparta, travelling and painting, and travelled with von Shack to the ancient sites of Ephesus, Magnesia and Smyrna.

Returning to Germany in 1839, Ross travelled to Munich in the August of that year. From November 1842 until late 1843 he lived in Rome, where he befriended the Austrian painter Carl Rahl. However, his visit was cut short by ill health, and he returned for convalescence to his family estate at Gut Altekoppel. He studied in Paris during 1845.

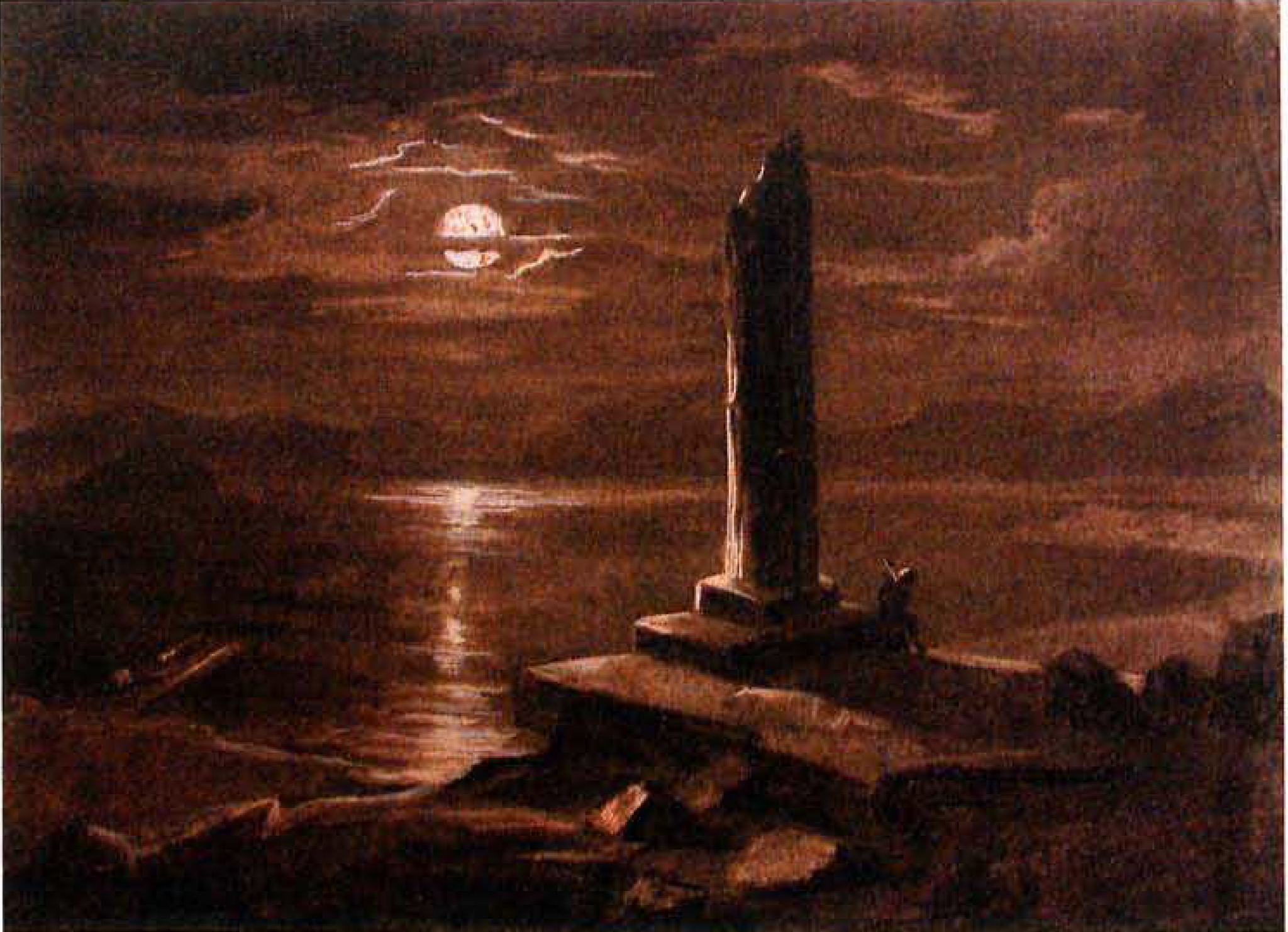
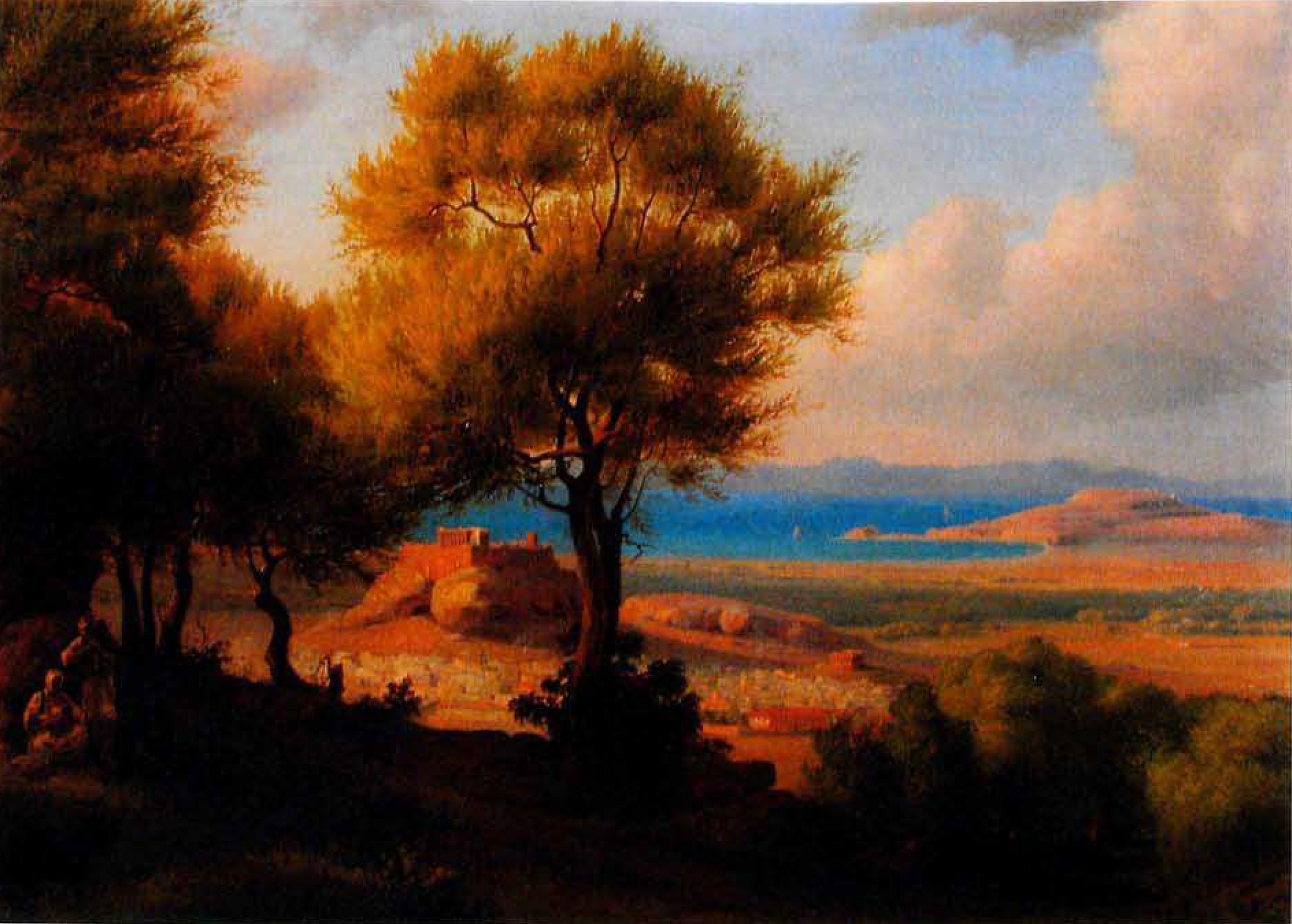
Two 1840 paintings by Ross showing subjects from his travels in Greece: the Temple of Apollo at Kolonna on Aegina (left) and a view of Athens from Mount Lycabettus

During the attempted uprising against Denmark in 1848, the provisional government of Schleswig, Holstein and Lauenberg sent Ross to Berlin, with a mission of reporting news from the revolt to the Duke of Augustenborg and negotiating assistance from Frederick William IV of Prussia. He took part in meetings of the Provisional Government during April 1848, but played no further part in politics. At the end of the war, he travelled to Munich and then to Rome, after which he settled permanently in Munich from 1851. He is known to have owned Portrait of a Carthusian, a 1446 painting by the Early Netherlandish painter Petrus Christus, until 1854; the painting's ownership history is otherwise unknown until its acquisition by the National Gallery of London in 1857. Artistically, he is most known for his paintings of classical landscapes.

== Personal life and death ==
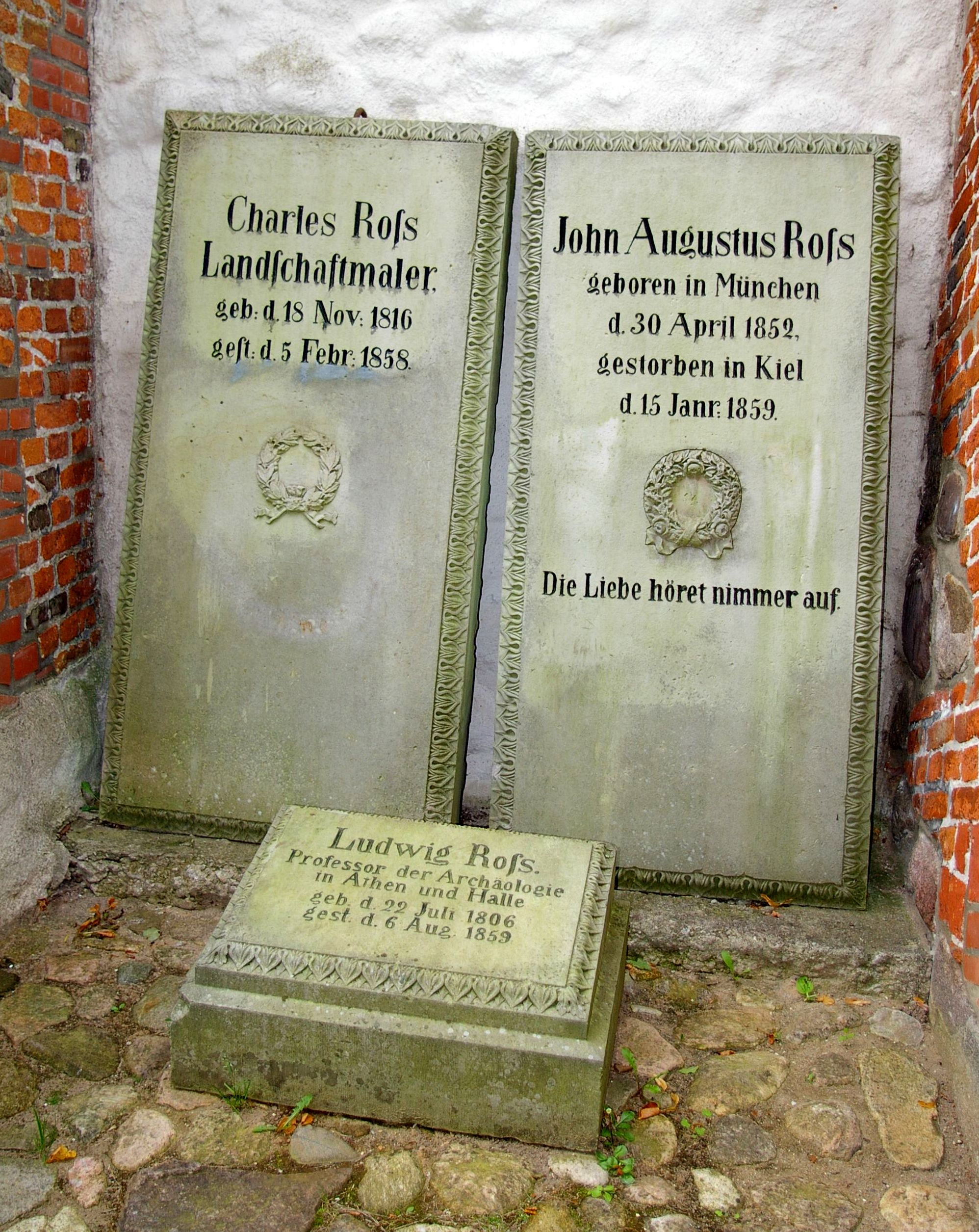
The graves of Karl Ross (left) and his brother Ludwig in Bornhöved

In 1847, Ross married Helene Abendroth, then aged twenty, whom he had met and taught during his time in Rome. She was the daughter of August Abendroth, who had supported Ross's art career, encouraged his studies abroad and bought many of his paintings.

Ross was affected by ill health throughout his life. He died of typhus on February 5, 1858, in Munich, and was buried in Bornhöved. The author Hermann Lingg wrote his obituary. His wife Helene outlived him, dying in 1911.

== Selected works ==
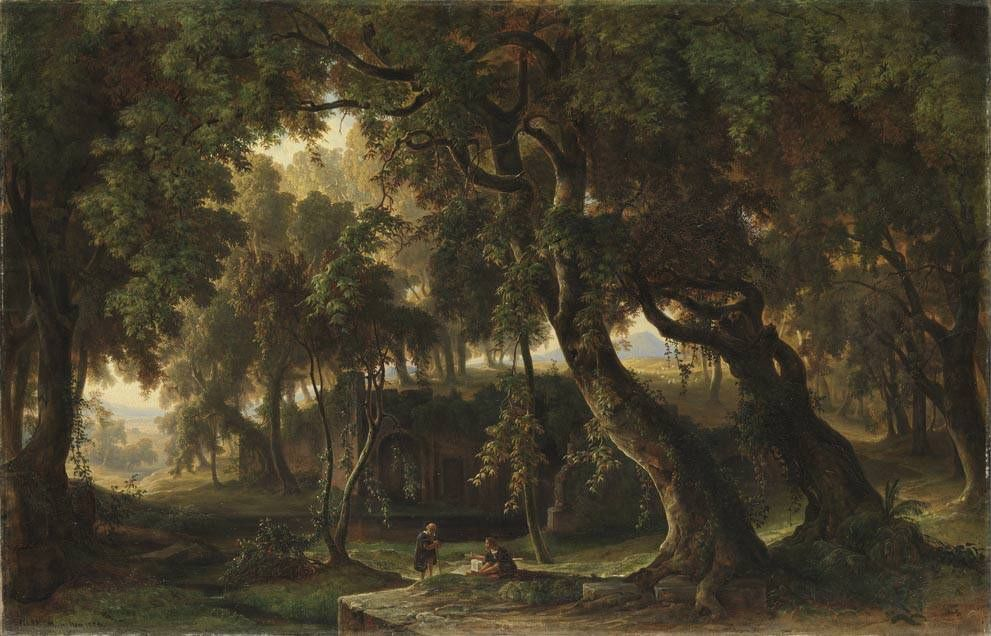
Die Grotte der Nymphe Egeria bei Rom, 1856

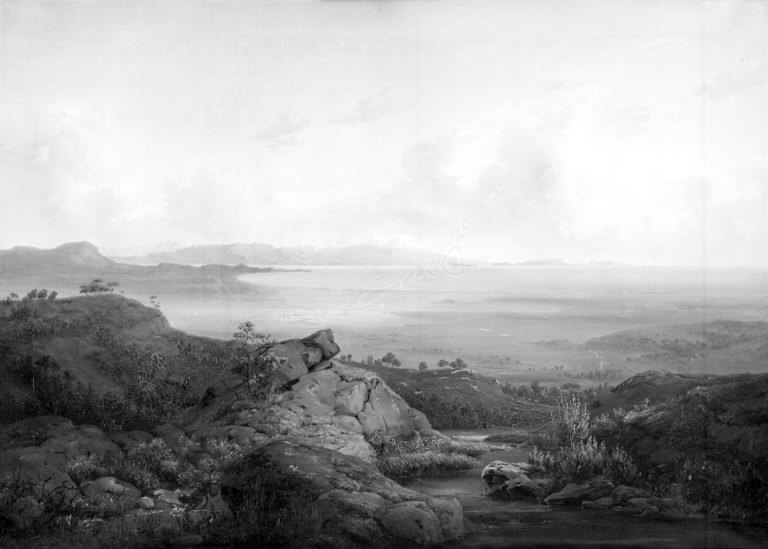
View of Euboea from Marathon, with Mount Ochi in the background, c. 1837–1839

== Bibliography ==
- von Donop, Lionel (1889). "Roß, Karl". Allgemeine Deutsche Biographie (in German). Vol. 29. Leipzig: Duncker & Humblot. pp. 243–246.
- Dyson, Stephen L. (2008). In Pursuit of Ancient Pasts: A History of Classical Archaeology in the Nineteenth and Twentieth Centuries. New Haven: Yale University Press. ISBN 9780300134971.
- Goette, Hans Rupprecht (2015). "Ludwig Ross in Attica und auf Aegina". In Goette, Hans Rupprecht; Palagia, Olga (eds.). Ludwig Ross und Griechenland: Acten sws Internationalen Kolloquiums, Athen, 2–3. Oktober 2002. Rahden: Marie Leidorf. pp. 219–232. ISBN 978-3-89646-424-8.
- Gramm-Lausen, H. (2000). Charles Roß 1816-1858. Ein Landschaftsmaler des 19. Jahrhunderts. Bau + Kunst. Kiel.
- Jahn, Otto (1863). "Vorwort". Erinnerungen und Mittheilungen aus Griechenland. By Ross, Ludwig. Berlin: Verlag von Rudolf Gaertner. pp. i–xxx.
- Minner, Ina E. (2006). Ewig ein Fremder im fremden Lande – Ludwig Ross (1806–1859) und Griechenland. Biographie. Möhnesee-Wamel: Bibliopolis. ISBN 3-933925-82-7.
- Russell, Peter (2020). Masters of Art: Jan van Eyck. Delphi Classics. ISBN 978-1-913487-28-7 – via Google Books.
- "Greece and the Greeks". The Spectator Supplement. London. 27 March 1863 – via Google Books.
