= Charles Lockhart =

Charles Lockhart may refer to:

- Charles B. Lockhart (1855–1948), politician in New Brunswick, Canada
- Charles Lockhart of the Lockhart baronets
- Charles Lockhart (musician) (1745–1815), English organist and composer of hymn-tunes

== See also ==
- Charles Lockhart-Ross (disambiguation)
