= August Abendroth =

Lawyer, businessman and philanthropist (1796–1867)

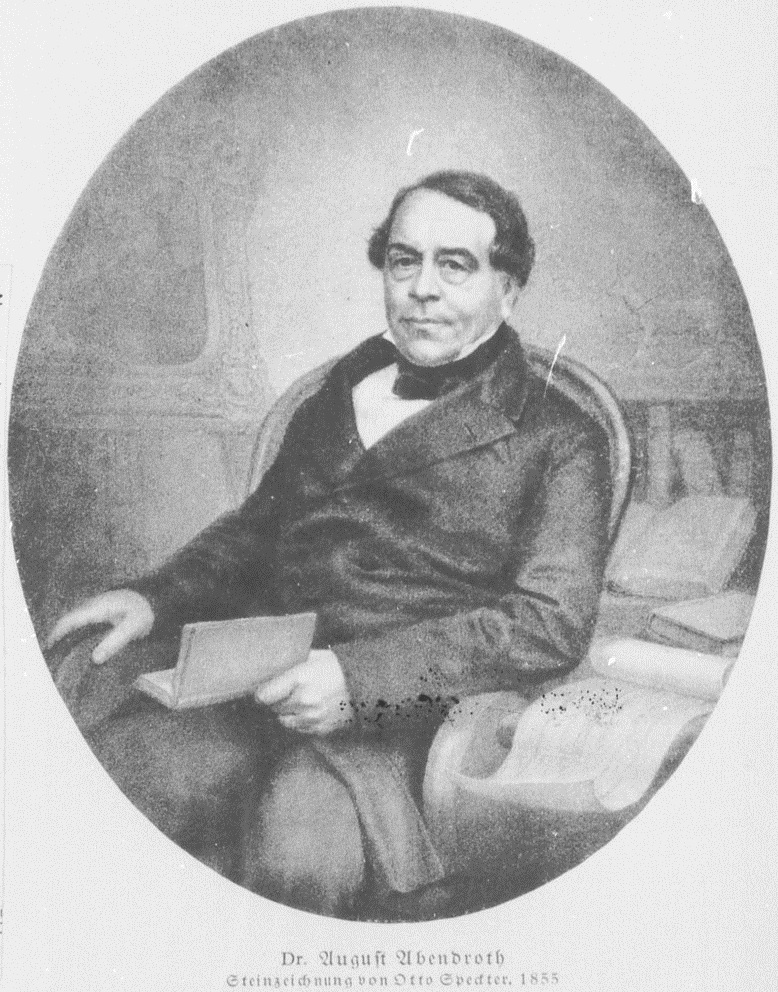
August Abendroth

August Abendroth (6 October 1796 – 19 March 1867) was a Hamburg jurist, merchant and philanthropist.

== Biography ==
August Abendroth was the eldest on nine children of the Hamburg senator (and later mayor) Amandus Augustus Abendroth from his marriage to Johanna Magdalena von Reck. August's younger brother Carl Eduard Abendroth would become a Member of the Hamburg Parliament.

Like his father, August studied legal science and worked as a lawyer in Hamburg. In 1822 he became one of the 30 founding members of the Hamburg Art Association, the organisation that founded the Hamburger Kunsthalle. He also promoted the Home mission. He even participated in promoting railways and building sites.

In 1837 he bought the largely unused Uhlenhorst area for 70,000 Bank Marks (106500 Mark Courant) at auction and began work on the drainage and subdivision. This was essential for building the new Uhlenhorst district. After his death, his widow bequeathed a portion of his private book collection to the city library, and a Uhlenhorst street is named after him.

One of his daughters, Helene (1827–1911), married the painter Karl Ross, whose art career Abendroth had promoted, encouraging his studies abroad and buying many of his paintings.
