= Charles Lockhart-Ross =

Charles Lockhart-Ross may refer to:

- Sir Charles Lockhart-Ross, 7th Baronet (c. 1763–1814)
- Sir Charles Lockhart-Ross, 8th Baronet (1812–1883), of the Lockhart-Ross baronets
- Sir Charles Lockhart-Ross, 9th Baronet (1872–1942)

== See also ==
- Charles Lockhart (disambiguation)
- Charles Ross (disambiguation)
