= Pedestal of Agrippa =

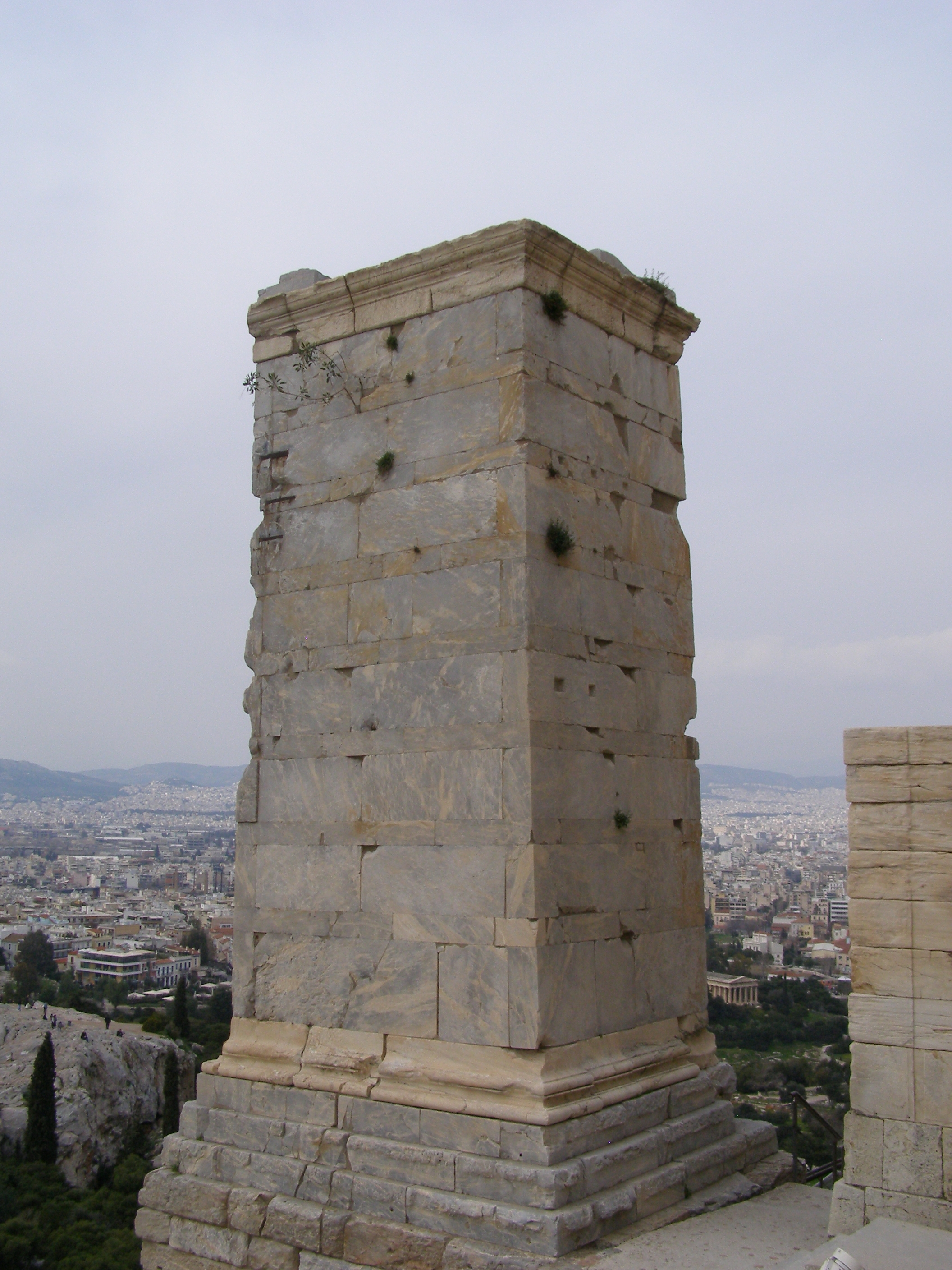
The Pedestal of Agrippa of Athens

The Agrippa Pedestal is a monumental stone base located west of the Propylaea of the Acropolis of Athens. Measuring 8.9 meters in height, it stands roughly equal in height to the nearby Temple of Athena Nike. Originally constructed in 178 BC, it was dedicated to Eumenes II of Pergamon to commemorate his victory in the chariot race at the Panathenaic Games. The pedestal once supported a life-sized bronze quadriga, probably driven by Eumenes and/or his brother Attalus II. Around 27 BC, the statue group was replaced with a new quadriga dedicated by the city of Athens to Marcus Agrippa, son-in-law of Augustus, in recognition of his reconstruction of the Odeon of Athens in front of the Agora. The Agrippa statue has not survived, but the pedestal remains in place.
