= Charles Ross (YouTuber) =

American YouTuber (born 1994)

- Born: January 20, 1994 (age 32)
- Occupation: Entertainer

Instagram information
- Page: Ross
- Genre: Comedy
- Followers: 2.1 million

TikTok information
- Page: RossCreations
- Genre: Comedy
- Followers: 3 million

YouTube information
- Channels: Vlog Creations; RossCreations
- Years active: 2008-present
- Genre: Comedy
- Subscribers: 5.77 million
- Views: 3.2 billion
- Last updated: March 19, 2025

Charles Ross is an American YouTuber known for his prank videos. He is the creator behind the YouTube channels RossCreations and Vlog Creations.

== YouTube career, investigation, arrests ==
In 2012, Ross was arrested for the first time when he filmed himself doing a backflip over two police officers. The video was posted to his channel and earned more than 11 million views through 2019.

In January 2013, Ross was charged with misdemeanor battery for giving wedgies outside a movie theater in Bradenton, Florida. He plead guilty and was placed on probation for six months. Ross would complete the conditions of his probation, ending it in three months instead.

In March 2013, Ross was arrested and charged with disorderly conduct after jumping over law enforcement officers, launching from a picnic table. He was given a deferred prosecution agreement that dismissed the charges as long as Ross did not get in trouble during that timeframe. Ross paid a fine and completed 15 hours of community service, and after three months, the charges were dismissed in June 2013.

Also in 2013, Ross was charged with trespassing, resisting a merchant, and disorderly conduct after streaking at Tropicana Field during a Tampa Bay Rays game. Adjudication on the charges was “withheld”, allowing for Ross to accept responsibility for the crime without it going on his record. He paid fines and court fees, and was given credit towards jail time for the time he was held after his arrest.

In April 2014, Ross was arrested after jumping onto a parade float in Manatee County, pushing an individual to the ground in the process. He faced charges of battery, but after three months, an action was filed with the court that determined no criminal charges were to be filed.

In March 2017, Ross was arrested after removing two stop signs from an intersection, having been charged with third degree grand theft. Ross completed a pre-trial intervention program, which included fines and community service, causing the charges to be dismissed in August 2017. The pre-trial intervention program was only intended to be used one time per offender, leading to Jeff Haynes, a defense lawyer and former prosecutor in Sarasota, to describe his feelings about the situation as "particularly troubled". Ross crowdfunded donations to pay for a lawyer.

On April Fools' Day in 2019, Ross faced his first felony charge for impersonating a police officer. He would ultimately take a plea deal, resulting in Ross being placed on probation for six months. As of April 2019, Ross has been arrested six times with nine criminal charges related to his videos. He has served community service hours and paid fines across Sarasota, Manatee, and Pinellas counties, but has never been sentenced to time in jail.

In 2022, Ross faced criticism for a video posted on TikTok, making a joke that a gap in a parking lot fence could be used as a "human cattle gate" for women he brings home from the bar, alluding to the weight of the woman. By October 2022, Ross had over 2.4 million followers on TikTok and 3.3 million subscribers to his YouTube channel.

In 2024, Ross was charged with allegations of trespassing while attempting to film videos for his channel. He was found guilty of trespassing in May 2024.

In November 2025, Ross posted a video of an opossum being catapulted into the air by a trap he set on his Instagram profile. The following month, Ross was investigated by the Florida Fish and Wildlife Conservation Commission and the State Attorney's Office. The video was criticized by local residents, animal-based nonprofits, and PETA. Through the end of 2025, Ross accumulated over 5 million subscribers on YouTube and over 2 million followers on Instagram.

== Personal life ==
Ross's sister was formerly employed by the Bradenton Police Department. She and other former officers organized opposition to the department, prompting an investigation into allegations of misconduct and criminal activity. Ross encouraged his YouTube followers to join him in supporting his sister's efforts, resulting in a small group of supporters gathering outside a Bradenton City Council meeting during a vote on the matter. Ross attempted to address the council but was denied permission to speak because the public comment period had already ended.
