= Charles Stanley Ross =

American literary scholar, author

- Occupations: Literary scholar, academic and author

Academic background
- Education: A.B., English; M.A. Ph.D., English Language and Literature; J.D.
- Alma mater: Harvard College; University of Chicago; Indiana University at Indianapolis

Charles Stanley Ross is an American literary scholar, academic, and author. He is a professor emeritus of English and comparative literature and a former director of the comparative literature program at Purdue University.

Ross's work focuses on British literature. He has also conducted research encompassing the Italian romantic epic, literature and law, and world literature. He has authored several books including the first English translation of Matteo Maria Boiardo’s Orlando Innamorato, The Custom of the Castle from Malory to Macbeth, Elizabethan Literature and the Law of Fraudulent Conveyance: Sidney, Spenser, and Shakespeare, and a translation of Statius’ The Thebaid: Seven against Thebes.

Ross is the editor of the Parlor Press Renaissance and Medieval Series and a founding editor of Forum for World Literature Studies. In 2018, he released a video documentary on Sir Philip Sidney: Shakespeare’s Muse of Fire: Sir Philip Sidney. Previously he produced a series of on-line teaching videos titled First Lines: A Project in Global Diversity, that highlights the range of world literature.

== Education ==
Ross received his AB degree in English from Harvard College in 1971. He later studied English Language and Literature at University of Chicago and received his MA and PhD degrees in 1972 and 1976, respectively. He then studied law and earned his JD degree from Indiana University at Indianapolis in 1994.

== Career ==
Ross was vice-president of National Arts Management, Inc., and taught briefly as a lecturer at Keene State College before joining Purdue University as an assistant professor in 1977. He was promoted to associate professor in 1985, and then professor of English in 1996. He retired in 2020 as professor emeritus.

At Purdue University, Ross also served as an assistant head at Department of English from 1995 till 1998 and from 2002 till 2003. He held an appointment as director of Comparative Literature Program in the College of Liberal Arts from 2001 till 2018.

== Research ==
Although Ross's work focuses on Renaissance literature, he has also conducted research on the works of Virgil, Dante, Boiardo, Ariosto, Spenser, Shakespeare, Milton, Nabokov, and Tom Wolf.

=== Orlando Innamorato by Matteo Maria Boiardo: A Translation ===
Ross authored the first English translation of Matteo Maria Boiardo's Orlando Innamorato (Orlando in Love). An abridged edition was published in 1995 in the Oxford World's Classics series. The original was hailed by Michael Murrin as a "major contribution" by Ross to "the Angelo-American understanding of the Italian Renaissance." The review also stated that "Ross’s translation fulfills a need and forms part of a broader movement among American scholars to make previously unknown Italian classics available to the modern reader." According to Murrin, "the whole edition has the meticulous planning and balance worthy of the poet and of the undertaking."

=== The Custom of the Castle ===
In 1997, Ross published The Custom of the Castle: From Malory to Macbeth, which focuses on odd instances of accepted behavior in medieval and Renaissance romances. The book was reviewed by J.S. Ryan as "a remarkable commentary on the power of legal fictions to (mis)-shape social behavior". According to Mishtooni Bose, "Ross's study has stimulating implications for a range of literature beyond the works to which he confines his discussion". J. B. Lethbridge stated that "the book broaches an excellent subject and raises important ideas both generally and in the reading of individual episodes."

In 2002, Elizabeth Fowler published a review stating that the "book will help us treat medieval and renaissance romance as intellectually serious stuff." According to Fowler, "Charles Ross has written an interesting and sometimes elegant book on the recurring literary phenomenon of romance encounters with castles that flaunt their own manners and laws".

=== Elizabethan Literature and the Law of Fraudulent Conveyance ===
Ross's book Elizabethan Literature and the Law of Fraudulent Conveyance: Sidney, Spenser, and Shakespeare, published in 2003, focuses on the origins, impact, and outcome of the Elizabethan obsession with how to avoid paying debts and the new laws designed to protect creditors. The book was reviewed as "cogent, carefully researched contribution" that focused on "exploring the reasons that laws about fraudulent conveyance dominated English legal and literary discourses between 1571 and 1601."

=== The Thebaid: Seven against Thebes. By Publius Papinius Statius: A Translation ===
Ross authored and published a translation of The Thebaid: Seven against Thebes in 2004. His work was recognized by Leslie Zakar Morgan as a "welcome addition to the book-shelf" and a "valuable contribution to a growing librmy of epic translation, commentary, and analysis in English," further saying that "Ross's Thebaid translation will draw those who desire further, in-depth study about the influence of Statius's work on Dante and other medieval and Renaissance writers".

== Awards and honors ==
- 1974-1975: Fulbright-Hays Scholar in Italy
- 2002: Translation Grant from the National Endowment for the Humanities
- 2013: The Book of Great Teachers, Purdue University

== Bibliography ==
=== Books ===
- Vladimir Nabokov: Life, Work, and Criticism (1985) ISBN 9780919966444
- Orlando Innamorato by Matteo Maria Boiardo: A Translation, with Introduction and Notes. (1995) ISBN 9780192824387
- The Custom of the Castle: From Malory to Macbeth (1997) ISBN 9780520204300
- Elizabethan Literature and the Law of Fraudulent Conveyance: Sidney, Spenser, and Shakespeare (2003) ISBN 9780754632634
- The Thebaid: Seven against Thebes. By Publius Papinius Statius. A Translation, with Introduction and Notes (2004) ISBN 978-0801886362
- Shakespeare in Hollywood, Asia, and Cyberspace (2009) ISBN 9781557535290
- Sir Philip Sidney’s Arcadia. A Restoration in Contemporary English of the Complete 1593 Edition of The Countess of Pembroke’s Arcadia (2017) ISBN 9781602358584

=== Selected articles ===
- Angelica and the Fata Morgana: Boiardo's Allegory of Love. Modern Language Notes, 96 (1981): pages 12–22.
- Underwater Women in Shakespeare Films. Comparative Literature and Culture 6.1 (2004)
- Avoiding the Issue of Fraud: 4, 5 Philip & Mary c 8 (the heiress protection statute), Portia, and Desdemona.” In Shakespeare and the Law. Ed. Constance Jordan and Karen Cunningham. 2006. Pages 91–108.
- Purgatory 9: The Ritual Keys. In Lectura Dantis: Purgatorio. A Canto-by-Canto Commentary (2008). Pages 85–94.
- C. S. Lewis, Augustine, and the Rhythm of the Trinity. Journal of Inklings Studies (Oxford Univ. Press), 2.1 (April 2012): pages 3–22.
- Deconstructing Epidermal Art and the Female Goth in Millenial Nordic Fiction: The Joys of Vulgarity in Stieg Larsson’s The Girls with the Dragon Tatoo. Forum for World Literature Studies 5.1 (2013): pages 13–26.
- The Topicality of Febosilla’s fier baiser in Boiardo’s Orlando Innamorato. Letteratura cavalleresca italiana (Pisa: Fabrizo Serra, Editore, 2019): pages 67–84.
