= Charlie Ross (footballer) =

Australian rules footballer

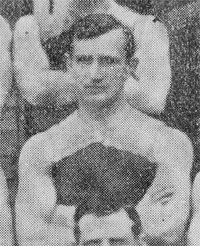

Personal information
- Full name: Charles Ross
- Born: 12 August 1878; Beechworth, Victoria
- Died: 20 October 1969 (aged 91); Caulfield, Victoria
- Original team: Brunswick

Playing career^{1}
Years	Club	Games (Goals)
1898–99	Brunswick (VFA)	22 (2)
1900–04	Carlton	41 (8)
- ^{1} Playing statistics correct to the end of 1904.

Charles Ross (12 August 1878 – 20 October 1969) was an Australian rules footballer who played with Carlton in the Victorian Football League (VFL).

== Family ==
The son of George Ross (1844-1920) and Eleanor Ross (1844-1928), née Kearney, Charles Ross was born at Beechworth, Victoria, on 12 August 1878.

He married Eleanor Jane Carss (1886-1978) on 1 June 1911.

== Football ==
He was cleared from Brunswick to Carlton on 1 June 1900.

He was injured in his last senior match with Carlton, against St Kilda, at the Junction Oval, on 28 May 1904.
