= Olga Palagia =

Greek archaeologist (born 1949)

Olga Palagia FSA
- Born: 1 October 1949 (age 77)

Academic background
- Education: National and Kapodistrian University of Athens, University of Oxford
- Thesis: Euphranor

Academic work
- Institutions: National and Kapodistrian University of Athens
- Notable works: Greek sculpture: function, materials, and techniques in the archaic and classical periods

Olga Palagia (born 1 October 1949) is Professor of Classical Archaeology at the National and Kapodistrian University of Athens and is a leading expert on ancient Greek sculpture. She is known in particular for her work on sculpture in ancient Athens and has edited a number of key handbooks on Greek sculpture.

== Career ==
Palagia undertook her BA in archaeology and history at the National and Kapodistrian University of Athens and graduated in 1972. She moved to the University of Oxford to study for a diploma in classical archaeology followed by a D.Phil., which was awarded in 1977. Her thesis, Euphranor, was published in 1980 by Brill.

Following Palagia's studies she worked first as a research assistant at the Acropolis Museum of Athens from 1978 to 1981. Palagia then joined the National and Kapodistrian University of Athens as a lecturer and was awarded tenure in 1983. She became an assistant professor in 1988, associate professor in 1993, and then professor in 1999. Palagia has been the Chair of the Department of Archaeology (2002-4) and the Deputy Head of the Faculty of History and Archaeology (2006-7).

Palagia has edited a number of key handbooks on Greek sculpture which are widely used in teaching and research as well as contributing chapters to standard handbooks. She is an expert on the sculptures of the Parthenon, publishing a book, The Pediments of the Parthenon (Brill, Leiden), in 1993 and lecturing widely on the topic. Palagia served on the Committee for the Restoration of the Acropolis Monuments 2005–2009.

Palagia has held a number of visiting fellowships at international institutions, including the Ailsa Mellon Bruce Visiting Senior Fellowship (Spring 1991) at the National Gallery of Art, Washington DC, the Sylvan C. Coleman and Pamela Coleman Memorial Fund Fellowship (March 1998) at the Metropolitan Museum of Art, New York, the Andrew W. Mellon Art History Fellowship (October 2004) at the Metropolitan Museum of Art, New York, and the Onassis Visiting Lectureship (2015) at the University of Waterloo, Ontario. Palagia delivered the Byvanck Lecture in 2015 at Leiden University, and has delivered a wide range of public lectures on sculpture across the world.

Palagia was elected as a Fellow of the Society of Antiquaries of London on 3 May 1990. She is an honorary fellow of the Society for the Promotion of Hellenic Studies, and a corresponding member of the German Archaeological Institute and the Archaeological Institute of America.

== Selected publications ==
- Euphranor (Brill, Leiden, 1980)
- 'A Colossal Statue of a Personification from the Agora of Athens' in Hesperia 51 (1982) pp. 99–113
- The Pediments of the Parthenon (Brill, Leiden, 1993)
- (ed.) Greek Offerings in Honour of John Boardman (Oxford, 1997)
- (ed.) Art in Athens during the Peloponnesian War (Cambridge, 2009)
- with William Coulson (eds.) Sculpture from Arcadia and Laconia (Oxford, 1993)
- with William Coulson, TL Shear, HA Shapiro, and FJ Frost (eds.) The Archaeology of Athens and Attica under the Democracy (Oxford, 1994)
- with JJ Pollitt (eds.) Personal Styles in Greek Sculpture (Cambridge, 1996)
- with John Oakley and William Coulson (eds.) Athenian Potters and Painters (Oxford, 1997)
- with William Coulson (eds.) Regional Schools in Hellenistic Sculpture (Oxford, 1998)
- 'Hephaestion's Pyre and the Royal Hunt of Alexander' in A.B. Bosworth and E.J. Baynham (eds), Alexander the Great in Fact and Fiction. (Oxford & New York: Oxford University Press, 2000). ISBN 9780198152873
- with Stephen V Tracey (eds.) The Macedonians in Athens 322-229 B.C. (Oxford, 2003)
- with Hans Rupprecht Goette (eds.) Ludwig Ross und Griechenland (Rahden, 2005)
- 'Fire from Heaven: Pediments and Akroteria of the Parthenon' in Jenifer Neils (ed.) The Parthenon : From Antiquity to the Present (Cambridge, Cambridge University Press, 2005)
- (ed.) Greek sculpture: function, materials, and techniques in the archaic and classical periods (Cambridge University Press, 2006)
- with Alkestis Spetsieri-Choremi (eds.) The Panathenaic Games (Oxford, 2007)
- with John H Oakley (eds.) Athenian Potters and Painters II (Oxford, 2009)
- (ed.) Art in Athens During the Peloponnesian War (Cambridge University Press, 2009)
- with Bonna D. Wescoat (eds.) Samothracian Connections: Essays in Honor of James R. McCredie (2010)
- with Hans Rupprecht Goette (eds.) Sailing to Classical Greece in honour of Petros Themelis (2011)
- 'The Functions of Greek Art' in (ed.) Clemente Marconi The Oxford Handbook of Greek and Roman Art and Architecture (Oxford, 2014)
- (ed.) Handbook of Greek Sculpture (de Gruyter, 2019)
