= Hans Rupprecht Goette =

German archaeologist (born 1956)

Hans Rupprecht Goette (German: [ˈɡœtə]; born 1956 in Soest, West Germany) is a German classical archaeologist.

== Life ==
Hans Rupprecht Goette studied classical archaeology, Latin philology and history from 1975 to 1982 at the University of Cologne, the University of Bonn, LMU Munich, and the University of Göttingen.

== Works ==
- Studien zu römischen Togadarstellungen, von Zabern, Mainz 1990 (Beiträge zur Erschließung hellenistischer und kaiserzeitlicher Skulptur und Architektur, Bd. 10) ISBN 978-3-8053-1070-3
- Athen, Attika, Megaris. Reiseführer zu den Kunstschätzen und Kulturdenkmälern im Zentrum Griechenlands, Böhlau, Köln-Weimar-Wien 1993 ISBN 978-3-412-03393-4
  - englisch: Athens, Attica and the Megarid. An archaeological guide, Routledge, London-New York 2001 ISBN 978-0-415-24370-4
- mit Adrian Zimmermann: Der Wandel archäologischer Denkmäler in historischen und zeitgenössischen Photographien. Eine Ausstellung in der Archäologischen Sammlung der Universität Zürich, Archäologische Sammlung der Universität Zürich, Zürich 1995 ISBN 978-3-905099-11-9
- Ho axiologos dēmos sunion = Landeskundliche Studien in Südost-Attika, Leidorf, Rahden 2000 (Internationale Archäologie, Bd. 59) ISBN 978-3-89646-331-9
- Herausgeber: Ancient roads in Greece.Proceedings of a symposion organized by the Cultural Association Aigeas (Athens) and the German Archaeological Institute (Athens) with the support of the German School at Athens, Kovač, Hamburg 2002 (Schriftenreihe Antiquates, Bd. 21) ISBN 978-3-8300-0444-8
- with Jürgen Hammerstaedt: Das antike Athen. Ein literarischer Stadtführer. Beck, München 2004, ISBN 978-3-406-51665-8
- with Thomas Maria Weber: Marathon. Siedlungskammer und Schlachtfeld - Sommerfrische und olympische Wettkampfstätte, von Zabern, Mainz 2004 (Sonderbände zur Antike Welt/Zaberns Bildbände zur Archäologie) ISBN 978-3-8053-3378-8
- with Günther Schörner: Die Pan-Grotte von Vari, von Zabern, Mainz 2004 (Schriften zur historischen Landeskunde Griechenlands, Bd. 1) ISBN 978-3-8053-3363-4
- Editor with Olga Palagia: Ludwig Ross und Griechenland. Akten des internationalen Kolloquiums, Leidorf, Rahden 2005 (Internationale Archäologie. Studia honoraria, Bd. 24) ISBN 978-3-89646-424-8
