= Panathenaic Way =

Thoroughfare in ancient Athens

- Ὁδός Παναθηναίων; Hodos Panathēnaiōn (Ancient Greek)
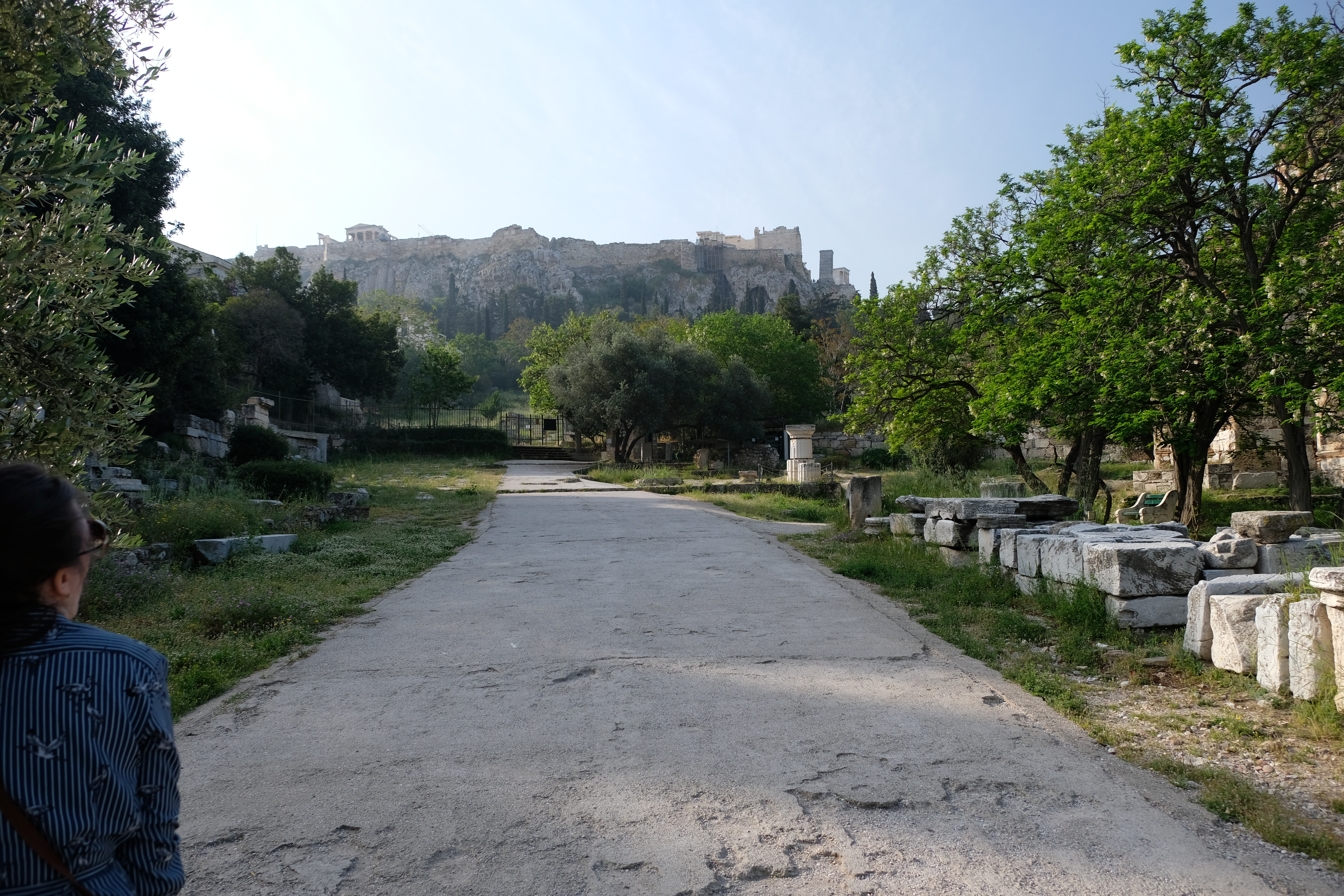
- The Panathenaic Way in 2018, looking south towards the Acropolis of Athens
- Type: Road
- Periods: Archaic–Byzantine
- Location: Athens

History
- Built: 6th century BCE
- Disused by: 6th–7th century CE

Site notes
- Length: 1.5 kilometres (0.9 mi)

The Panathenaic Way (Note: English pronunciation /ˌpæn.æθ.ə.ˈneɪ.ɪk/, PAN-ath-ə-NAY-ik. Ancient Greek: Ὁδός Παναθηναίων; Hodos Panathēnaiōn. For the Greek, see Ficuciello 2008, p. 56; for the rendering as Panathenaic Way, see e.g. Shear 2007, p. 139.) was a major road of classical Athens. (Note: The road's name is alternatively rendered as the Street of the Panathenaia; it is also known in modern scholarship as the dromos ('track'). The latter name has little attestation in ancient sources: see Dickenson 2017, p. 106, and § Names and date below.) It ran for 1.5 kilometres (0.9 mi) from the Dipylon Gate in the north-west of the city to the Acropolis in its centre. From c. 550 – c. 514 BCE onwards, it was an important processional route in various festivals, including the Great Panathenaia, the City Dionysia and the initiation ceremony of the Eleusinian Mysteries.

The Panathenaic Way is among the oldest known roads in Athens; parts of its surface show possible evidence of use from the late Neolithic period (c. 5500 – c. 3200 BCE), and secure evidence of it during the Middle Helladic and Late Helladic periods of the Bronze Age (c. 2100 – c. 1600 BCE and c. 1600 – c. 1050 BCE respectively). The Way is traditionally considered to have been formalised around 566 BCE, in connection with the inauguration or reorganisation of the Great Panathenaia festival. It passed through the Agora, the civic and commercial centre of the city, and its use in festive activities may have played a role in the establishment of the Agora as a large open space. It was widened to a maximum of 39 to 40 metres (128 to 131 ft) by the Hellenistic period (323–86 BCE), and parts were paved in the first century CE. Despite attempts to revive it in the mid-fourth century CE, it deteriorated throughout late antiquity (c. 200 – c. 800 CE) and its use declined substantially after the 580s. At least parts of the route continued in use, albeit narrowed by later construction, until the sixth or seventh century CE, though the Panathenaic processions along it had stopped by the early fifth century.

Landmarks along the Panathenaic Way included the Pompeion, from which festive processions began the route along it; the Altar of the Twelve Gods; and a monument to the "Tyrannicides", Harmodios and Aristogeiton. The Way was used for several events during the Great Panathenaia, including a race between torch-bearing runners from the Academy to the Acropolis, equestrian races (from at least 182/1 BCE), (Note: Years of the Athenian calendar ran from midsummer to midsummer.) and possibly foot races conducted through the Agora. During the City Dionysia, it was used to convey a statue of the festival's patron god, Dionysos, from the Dipylon Gate to the Sanctuary of Dionysos Eleuthereus on the Acropolis's south slope. A cavalry procession during the festival of Olympian Zeus followed the same route, ending at the Temple of Olympian Zeus. Initiates into the Eleusinian Mysteries used the Way to process from the City Eleusinion, north of the Acropolis, to the Sacred Gate prior to taking the Sacred Way to Eleusis. Part of the route's course was rediscovered in 1837, and it has been investigated since by the German Archaeological Institute at Athens, the American School of Classical Studies at Athens, and the Greek Archaeological Service; sections have also been restored and developed for touristic purposes in the late twentieth and early twenty-first centuries.

== Names and date ==
External image
- Inscription naming the Panathenaic Way, from the American School of Classical Studies at Athens

The name Panathenaic Way is known from an inscription, dating to the fourth century BCE, (Note: The inscription is known by the identification number SEG LI.168. Eugene Vanderpool tentatively suggested that it may date to the second half of the century, as T. Leslie Shear, the director of the Agora excavations, determined in his initial report of its discovery.) in the northern wall of the Acropolis, in the centre of Athens, near the Klepsydra fountain. Laura Ficuciello suggests that this name probably referred exclusively to the parts of the Way within the city boundaries, between the Dipylon Gate and the Acropolis. In the fourth century CE, the rhetorician Himerios used the term dromos (δρόμος, 'track') to refer to the section between the Academy, around three kilometres (2 mi) outside the boundary of the city, and the Agora, the civic and commercial centre of Athens. The name is otherwise unattested in ancient sources, though it has become commonly used in modern scholarship.

The Panathenaic Way is among the oldest known routeways in Athens. It may be the only one with evidence of use in the Neolithic period (c. 7000 – c. 3200 BCE): (Note: Costaki & Theocharaki 2021, p. 49. For the absolute dates of the Neolithic in Greece, see Bintliff 2012, p. 46.) a small section of the road in the north-west of the Agora, excavated in 1939, returned road layers with pottery deposits that the director of the Agora excavations, T. Leslie Shear, identified as Neolithic. (Note: Shear 1940, pp. 299–300: see also Costaki 2006, pp. 476–477. For Shear's position, see Lord 1947, p. 202.) Sara Anderson Immerwahr, in 1971, wrote that the pottery in question was "very scrappy and nondescript", and could belong either to the late Neolithic (that is, after c. 5500 BCE) or to the Early Helladic period of the Bronze Age (c. 3100 – c. 2100 BCE). (Note: Immerwahr 1971, p. 52. For the dates of the Early Helladic, see Manning 2010, p. 23. For those of the Late Neolithic, see Tomkins 2010, p. 36.) It is one of few routes in Athens with identifiable surfaces from the Bronze Age Middle Helladic and Late Helladic periods (c. 2100 – c. 1600 BCE and c. 1600 – c. 1050 BCE, respectively). (Note: Costaki & Theocharaki 2021, p. 49. For the absolute dates of the Middle Helladic and Late Helladic, see Shelmerdine 2008, p. 4. For the excavation of Middle Helladic layers in the Agora, see Thompson 1966, p. 45.)

The formalisation of the Way is traditionally dated to 566/5 BCE, and connected with the inauguration or reorganisation of the Great Panathenaia festival. (Note: From 566/5 onwards, the Great Panathenaia was celebrated every fourth year, with the "Lesser Panathenaia", sometimes known as the "annual" Panathenaia, on each of the other three. Some form of Panathenaic festival is believed to have existed beforehand.) Two wells near the City Eleusinion, a sanctuary to the north of the Acropolis, were closed around 575 BCE: this has been associated with the expropriation of private buildings in the area for the establishment of a processional route. Excavations in the north-west corner of the Agora found levelled ground, interpreted as the preparatory stage of road-building, dating to the sixth century BCE, though the earliest evidence of an actual surface dated to no earlier than 475 BCE. A packed road surface dating to the second half of the fifth century BCE was found in the same area.

== Course ==
Map of the Panathenaic Way (dashed red line), with buildings from the Roman period. The numbered locations are: 1: the Demosion Sema (public cemetery) of the Kerameikos; 2: the Dipylon Gate; 3: the Sacred Gate; 4: the Pompeion; 5: the Stoa Basileios; 6: the classical Agora; 7: the Stoa of Attalos; 8: the City Eleusinion; 9: the Peripatos around the Acropolis; 10: the Propylaia; 11: the Parthenon; 12: the Theatre of Dionysus; 13: the Areopagus; 14: the Pnyx.

The route followed by the Way originated at the Academy and passed through the Demosion Sema (public cemetery) outside the city limits. There is no evidence of a constructed surface on the sections outside the city until the fifth century BCE, though it is possible that the bedrock in this area was levelled to serve as a road surface. Most of the road was constructed with a hard pebble surface, with retaining walls and steps built in the part that climbs the Acropolis.

The road entered the city in the north-west. Its course originally followed the south bank of the Eridanos river, passing through the Sacred Gate, but moved north-east around 500 BCE, perhaps linked to the construction of the Stoa Basileios and the canalisation of the Eridanos. After the hasty construction of the Themistoklean Wall, the earliest securely attested perimeter wall of Athens, in the winter of 479/8 BCE, (Note: On the construction of the Themistoklean Wall, see Davies 1992, p. 298 and Neer 2012, p. 269.) the Way entered the city at the Dipylon Gate. By the late fifth century BCE, it continued south-east through the inner areas of the Kerameikos towards the Agora. At the north-west corner of the Agora, immediately next to the Stoa Basileios, it was crossed by the Eridanos river; the river was probably spanned by a bridge from the earliest times, and was canalised and covered by the Roman period.

From the Agora, the Way reached the City Eleusinion before turning south-east to the Klepsydra and ascending the Acropolis via the Propylaia on its western side, approximately 1.5 kilometres (0.9 mi) from the Dipylon Gate. The overall route has a rise of 94 metres (308 ft) in elevation, though this increases sharply towards the end: between the Dipylon and the City Eleusinion it rises by 38.7 metres (127 ft) over a distance of 760 metres (2,490 ft), while between the City Eleusinion and the Acropolis it rises by 55.3 metres (181 ft) in 249 metres (817 ft). The precise route taken across the Agora by the Way in the fifth century BCE and earlier is not definitively known: it may not have been fixed until the fourth or second century BCE. John McK. Camp has suggested that the need for a space for festive activities along the route of the Panathenaic Way may have been a major factor in the establishment of the Agora as a large open square. There is no evidence of wheel ruts in the fifth-century BCE layers of the Panathenaic Way immediately outside the north-west corner of the Agora, and it has therefore been suggested that wheeled traffic was forbidden from using the route to enter the Agora from this direction until the fourth century BCE. After this, the Way became a major route for traffic coming to the Agora from the hinterland of Attica. During the classical period (c. 500 – c. 300 BCE), (Note: Ficuciello 2008, p. 137. For the dates of the classical period in Athens, see Neils 2021, p. 1.) it was 10 metres (33 ft) wide at its narrowest (between the Agora and the Acropolis), considerably larger than the Athenian average of 3.5 to 4.5 metres (11 to 15 ft). Its widest section in this period was 20 metres (66 ft) wide, as the road entered the Agora from the north-west. This unusual width was to accommodate ritual events, such as the annual Epitaphia, in which those Athenians and allies who had fallen in battle in that year were publicly buried in the Demosion Sema.

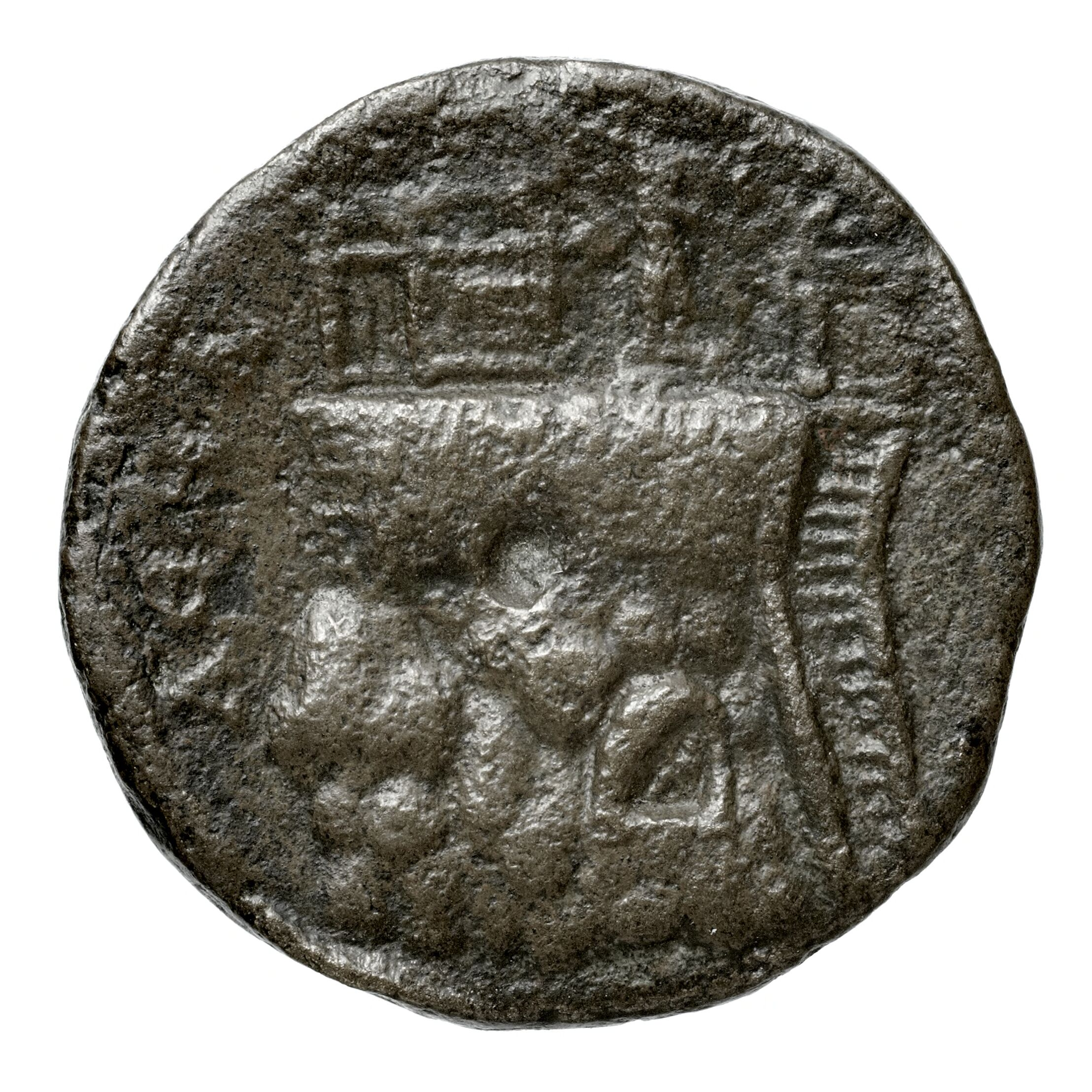
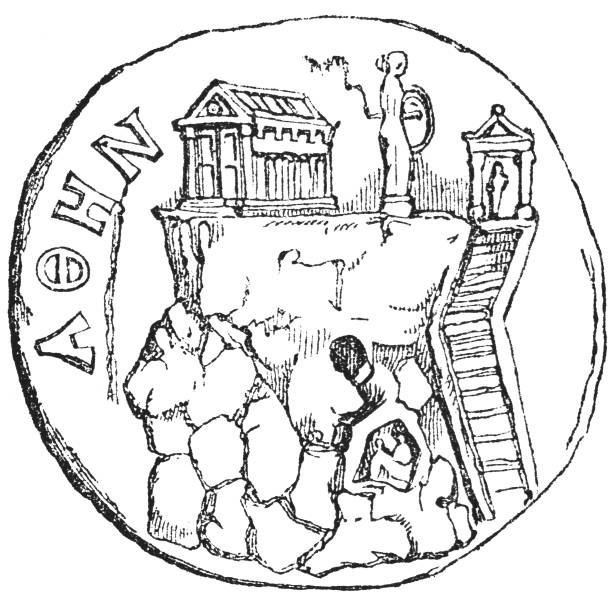
Photograph and woodcut of an Athenian coin of the 2nd century CE, showing the ascent of the Panathenaic Way up the Acropolis

Shortly after 394 BCE, when the Eridanos was straightened, the Panathenaic Way was linked to the adjacent Sacred Way by means of a cross street and a bridge over the river, a short distance outside the Dipylon near the Tritopatreion sanctuary. As with other roads connected to the city gates, the Way was repaired and widened, perhaps indicating that it was more formally defined, in the later fourth century BCE. By the Hellenistic period (323–86 BCE), (Note: For the date, see Mikalson 1998, p. 4.) it was around 29 metres (95 ft) wide immediately before the Agora and 39 to 40 metres (128 to 131 ft) at its widest point outside the Dipylon. During this period, a stone gutter was constructed along its south-west side.

The section of the Panathenaic Way between the south-east of the Agora and the Acropolis was paved, which was unusual for Athenian streets, in the first century CE. This paving, which has been associated with an inscription dating to the reign of the Roman emperor Claudius (r. 41 – 54 CE), (Note: Ficuciello 2008, p. 146. For the dates of Claudius's reign, see Burgers 2001, p. 96.) was made up of reused blocks from earlier structures, some of poros stone and some of marble from a building of the Periklean period (c. 460–429 BCE). (Note: Ficuciello 2008, p. 144. For the dates of the Periclean period, see Samons 2009, p. 18.) It preserves wheel ruts made by traffic moving along it. This area was repaved in the first half of the second century CE, possibly in preparation for the Great Panathenaia organised by the philosopher and senator Herodes Atticus in 143 CE; (Note: That is, for the civil year 143/4 CE.) most of the paving stones visible in modern times date to this phase.

In late antiquity (that is, around the third to the sixth century CE), the road was repeatedly graded to level its course across the Agora; evidence of these operations is preserved in a drain used until the 580s, which was partly removed during them. (Note: Shear 1973a, pp. 124–125. For the dates of late antiquity, see Nees 2023, p. 20, with n. 24.) The western edge of the Way across the Agora deteriorated along with the area's drainage system, becoming largely undifferentiated from its surroundings. In the same period, the road was redirected to the west in the Agora's south-west corner to avoid the Post-Herulian Wall, itself constructed around 287 CE. (Note: Frantz 1988, pp. 28–29. For the date of the Post-Herulian Wall, see Frantz 1988, pp. 5–6; Sironen 1994, pp. 19–22.) At least part of the Panathenaic Way was still in use by the sixth or seventh century CE, near the north-west corner of the Agora, though this road had been substantially narrowed by the construction of houses during the same period. Traffic on the Way declined substantially following the Slavic invasion of Greece in the 580s; after this, parts of the road became covered in silt, and its drainage systems, established in the classical period, ceased to function.

=== Structures and monuments ===
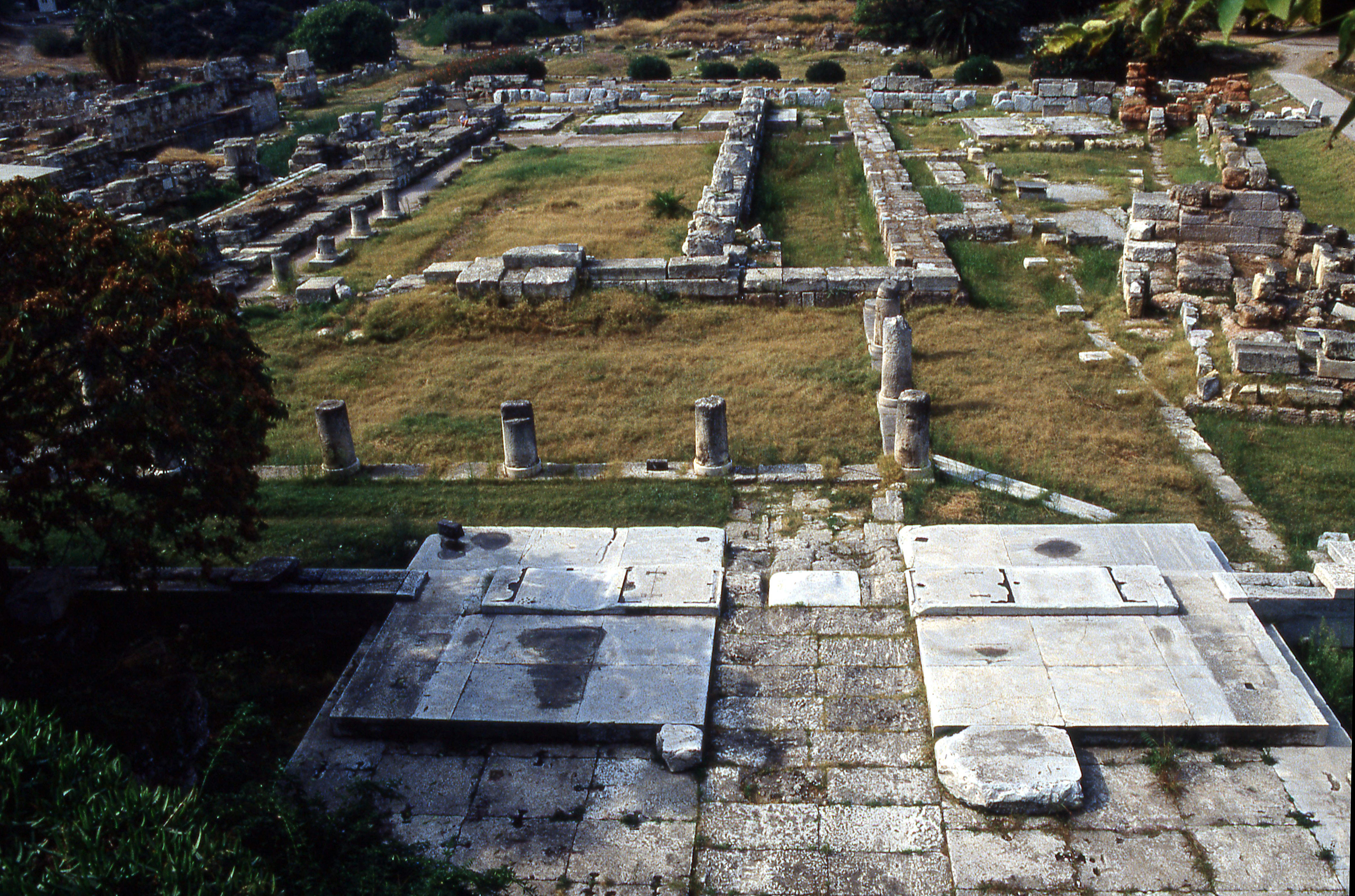
The Pompeion from the south-east; the foreground shows the propylon (gateway) through which processions would pass from the peristyle courtyard behind.

Outside the walls in the Kerameikos, the Panathenaic Way was lined with tombs, including the public tombs erected for the Athenian war dead and the Tomb of the Lacedaemonians erected in honour of the Spartan soldiers killed supporting the Athenian democratic uprising against the Thirty Tyrants in 404/3 BCE. (Note: Knigge 1991, pp. 11, 40, 47. On the Tomb of the Lacedaemonians, see Scott 2018, pp. 97–99.) It also passed the Round Bath, a public bathhouse constructed in the fifth century BCE. Within the walls, buildings along the Way included the Pompeion (lit. 'Building for Processions'), constructed around 400 BCE immediately adjacent to the Dipylon Gate. This was the starting-point for festive processions, including that of the Great Panathenaia, in which a robe (peplos) intended for a statue of the goddess Athena on the Acropolis would be conveyed along the Way. (Note: At a certain point, the peplos was displayed as the sail of a large cart in the shape of a wooden ship. Jenifer Neils dates this innovation to the late fourth century BCE, while Julia L. Shear argues that it began in the Roman period (that is, after 86 BCE).)

At some point after the Graeco-Persian Wars (that is, after 479 BCE), probably during the time of Kimon (d. 450 BCE), a terracotta pipeline was constructed underground along the Panathenaic Way between the Dipylon and the Agora. This pipeline was probably constructed as part of Kimon's project to beautify the Academy, to supply the precinct with water. From the Hellenistic period onwards, the same section was lined with shops and stoas (covered walkways); (Note: Ficuciello 2008, p. 137. Himerios, writing in the fourth century CE, mentions stoas "in which the Athenians and others buy and sell".) the second-century CE traveller Pausanias reported additionally seeing religious sanctuaries and a gymnasium alongside it. (Note: Knigge 1991, p. 10, citing Pausanias, Description of Greece, 1.2.4–5.) Some of these stoas, constructed prior to the mid-first century CE, were built using the remains of buildings destroyed during the sack of Athens by the Roman general Sulla in 86 BCE.

The Panathenaic Way passed the Altar of the Twelve Gods at the north-west corner of the Agora; the monument is aligned on a slightly different axis to the road, suggesting that it was originally built along the route that preceded it. Immediately outside the altar, a line of limestone bases, dating approximately to the middle of the fifth century BCE, crossed the Panathenaic Way. On excavation in 1972, these were believed to have been used to insert starting-posts for runners in events during the Great Panathenaia. Further excavations between 2010 and 2012 revealed a second identical line 12 metres (39 ft) to the south, and additional postholes forming the remaining sides of a square enclosure approximately 12 by 15 metres (39 by 49 ft) in area. John McK. Camp suggests that the enclosure, which apparently blocked the Panathenaic Way, was the perischoinisma, a roped-off area described by the Roman-period author Plutarch as being in the same location. Camp posits that it was used to control access into the main Agora square.

A statue group commemorating Harmodios and Aristogeiton, the killers of the tyrant Hipparchos, stood alongside the Way in the centre of the Agora. The first version, sculpted in bronze by Antenor, was erected around the turn of the fifth century and taken during the destruction of Athens by the invading Persian forces in 480–479 BCE; it was replaced around 477 by one by Kritios and Nesiotes. The original statues were returned to Athens at some point after Alexander the Great captured the Persian capital of Susa in 330 BCE, and may have been displayed alongside Kritios and Nesiotes's version. During the early Hellenistic period (specifically, from at least 314/3 BCE), it was forbidden to erect any other monuments in the statues' vicinity, though this prohibition ceased to be observed by 293/2 BCE.

Between 98 and 102 CE, the Library of Pantainos was built facing onto the Panathenaic Way, close to the Stoa of Attalos in the Agora. Around 280 CE, part of the Post-Herulian Wall was constructed along the section of the Way between the Agora and the Acropolis. Remodelling of the section between the Dipylon and the Agora took place in the fourth century CE, probably connected with the revival of the Panathenaia festival in the middle of the century; the Pompeion, destroyed in Sulla's sack of 86 BCE and subsequently built over with a storage building in the Antonine period (138–192 CE), was reconstructed with a ceremonial gate as a starting-point for processions. (Note: Frantz 1988, p. 26. For the dates of the Antonine period, see Grant 1996, p. 1. For the destruction of the Pompeion in 86 BCE, see Knigge 1991, p. 44.)

== Use in festivals ==
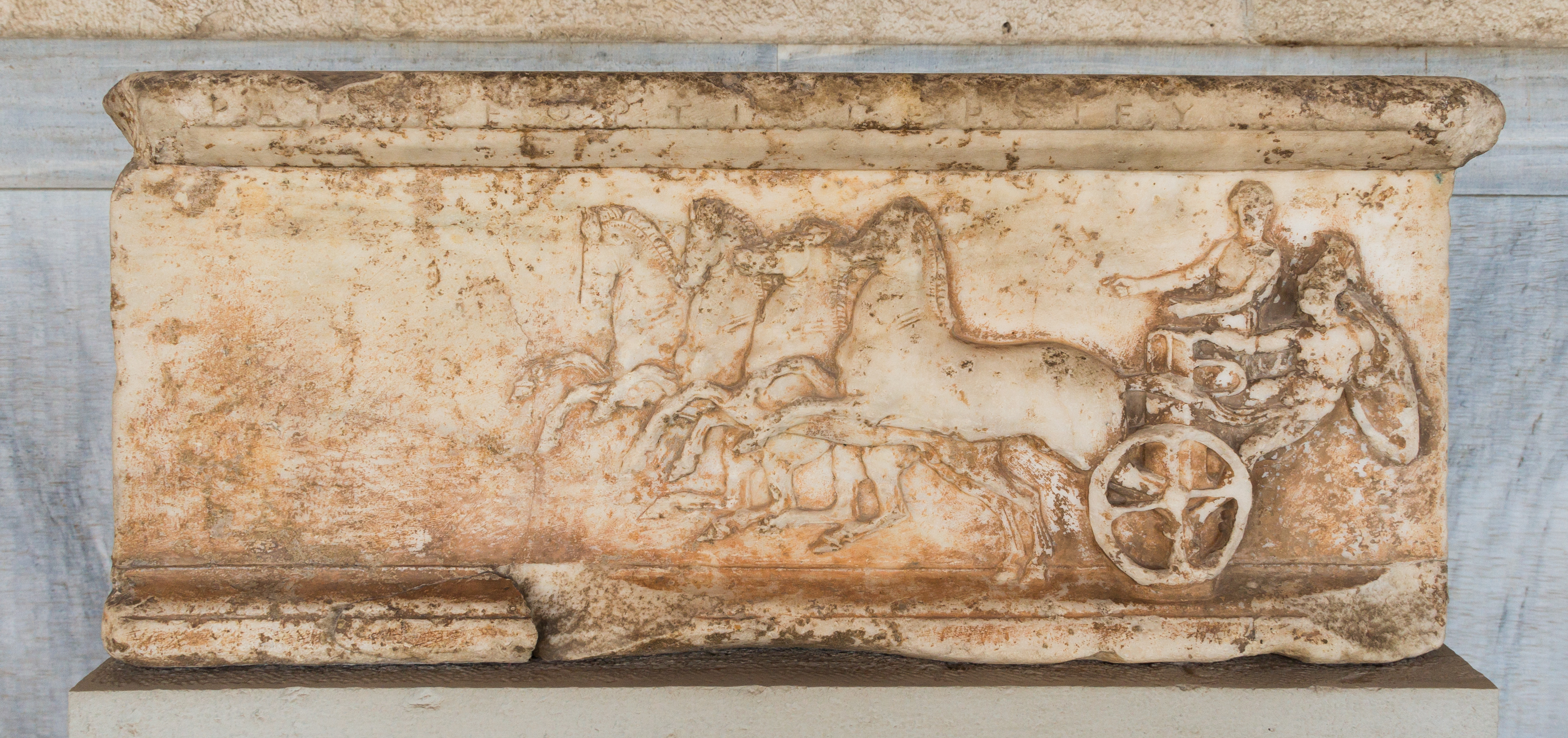
Monument from the Agora, commemorating the victory of Krates in the apobates race, 4th century BCE

As a processional route, the Panathenaic Way replaced an older route that approached the Acropolis from the south-east, perhaps passing through an agora to the north or east of the rock, before ascending the Acropolis from the south. The route was changed to enter the Acropolis from the west at some point between c. 550 and c. 514 BCE. (Note: The terminus post quem is given by the fact that the first ramp ascending the Acropolis from this direction was constructed over a house that was still occupied until c. 550 BCE. The terminus ante quem is the assassination of the tyrant Hipparchos, who was killed at the Leokoreion shrine in the classical Agora while awaiting the procession.) An account by the third-century CE author Philostratus, describing the Great Panathenaia festival of 143 CE organised by Herodes Atticus, states that Herodes arranged for a self-moving mechanical ship to form part of the procession, which looped around the City Eleusinion rather than passing via the Way to the west of the sanctuary. (Note: Strazdins 2019, p. 258, Bur 2025, pp. 197–198. For the Panathenaiac Way as the road to the west of the sanctuary, see Travlos 1971, p. 198.) John Travlos treats this as a normal part of the processional route, while Ficuciello suggests that it may have been specific to the Panathenaia of 143: Oscar Broneer suggests specifically that the route may have been altered because the direct path past the Eleusinion was too steep for the ship.

Parts of the Way may have been used for athletic events from the sixth century BCE, and there is evidence of post-holes outside the Dipylon for wooden spectator stands used to watch these events in excavated layers dating to the classical and Hellenistic periods. During the Great Panathenaia, the Panathenaic Way formed the route run by torch-bearing racers (an event known as the lampadedromia) between altars in the Academy and the Acropolis. Another torch-race was carried out during the Epitaphia, between the altar of Prometheus in the Academy and the Dipylon Gate. From at least 182/1 BCE, and probably long beforehand, equestrian races were held during the Panathenaia along the processional route of the Panathenaic Way, a section about 770 yards (700 m) long between the Dipylon Gate and the City Eleusinion. (Note: Shear 2007, p. 139. For the length of this section, see Mikalson 1998, p. 196.) In 170/69 BCE and for around two decades afterwards, twelve races were held there in each festival, including the apobates, which involved dismounting and remounting a moving chariot while wearing armour: Julia L. Shear comments that the steepness and narrowness of parts of the road created a high risk of "broken ankles, wrecked vehicles, or worse". The section of the Way in the Agora was used to erect monuments celebrating the victors in these equestrian competitions.

The Panathenaic Way was also a processional route at other festivals. During the City Dionysia, a procession carrying a statue of the festival's patron god, Dionysos, entered the city via the Dipylon Gate and proceeded to the City Eleusinion, before turning onto the Street of the Tripods to the east of the Acropolis, eventually ending up in the Sanctuary of Dionysos Eleuthereus on the Acropolis's south slope. A cavalry procession during the festival of Olympian Zeus followed the same route, ending at the Temple of Olympian Zeus south-east of the Acropolis. Initiates into the Eleusinian Mysteries followed the route in reverse, from the City Eleusinion to the Sacred Gate adjacent to the Dipylon, from which they followed the Sacred Way to Eleusis.

The buildings along the Panathenaic Way, particularly in the area from the Dipylon to the Agora, were badly damaged in the sack of 396 CE, conducted by forces of the Visigothic king Alaric I. Reconstruction in the Agora area began around 410, and a large villa, known as the Villa of the Giants, was built across much of its southern and central area. This structure had no vantage points from which a procession along the Panathenaic Way, immediately adjacent to it, could be seen, and Julia Shear argues that this indicates that the Panathenaic processions had ceased by this date. They may equally have stopped in the early 390s, when sacrifices to the pre-Christian Graeco-Roman gods were outlawed by the Roman emperor Theodosius I, (Note: Shear 2021, p. 7. For Theodosius and the dates of his prohibition, see Rives 2024, p. 294.) and had certainly stopped by 430 or 431 CE, when the philosopher Proklos discussed the Panathenaia in a commentary on the Timaeus, a fourth-century BCE dialogue by the philosopher Plato. Proklos describes the Panathenaia in the past tense, and cites earlier writers to provide details of its events. In Shear's view, this indicates that neither he nor his contemporaries had personal experience of the festival.

== Modern history ==
=== Archaeological investigations ===
Part of the route of the Panathenaic Way was established in 1837 by the chance discovery, during the construction of a house, of the Monument of Euboulides east of the Dipylon Gate; this was mentioned by Pausanias as being on the road from the Kerameikos to the Agora. Archaeological surveys along the route between the Dipylon and the Agora were carried out from the late nineteenth century. In 1897, Wilhelm Dörpfeld, the director of the German Archaeological Institute at Athens, led an excavation in the north-west corner of the Agora which discovered the northern edge of the Panathenaic Way. The American School of Classical Studies at Athens (ASCSA) began excavations in the Agora in 1931; these uncovered, in 1939, a horos (boundary-marker) indicating the southern edge of the road.

Further investigations took place under the ASCSA and the Greek Archaeological Service throughout the twentieth century. Greek excavations in 1966 uncovered several short sections of the road outside the Dipylon Gate, identifying road layers dating from between the archaic and the Hellenistic period. The Hellenistic road in this area was estimated as reaching up to 38 metres (125 ft) in width; part of it had been damaged by the construction of a Hellenistic house over its eastern edge. (Note: Ficuciello 2008, p. 81, n. 150; Αθήναι [Athens]. Αρχαιολογικόν Δελτίον [Archaeological Bulletin] (in Greek). 22 (2.1: Χρονικά): 89–92. 1967.) Small test excavations in 1971, led by Stella Grobel Miller, established the date and level of the earliest road layers, and were followed by more extensive digging of test trenches in 1973 and 1974, under the direction of Susan I. Rotroff. These latter excavations uncovered sixteen distinct archaeological layers, dating between the middle fifth century and the late first century BCE. The Greek Archaeological Service made an excavation on Plateon Street, outside the Dipylon Gate in the modern Kerameikos district; the work identified a section 20 metres (66 ft) in width that had fallen out of use before the late Roman period, at which time a group of tombs had been constructed into it. (Note: Ficuciello 2008, p. 81, n. 150; Αθήναι [Athens]. Αρχαιολογικόν Δελτίον [Archaeological Bulletin] (in Greek). 29 (2.1: Χρονικά): 91–92. 1973–1974.) Further Greek excavations along the Way took place in 1975 and 1976.

=== Restoration and conservation ===
Parts of the Panathenaic Way on the Acropolis continue to be used for access to the site. Between 1997 and 2004, the 1st Ephorate of Prehistoric and Classical Antiquities of the Greek Archaeological Service conducted the "Program of the Unification of the Archaeological Sites of Athens", as part of which several monuments and ancient routes around the Agora and Areopagus, including the Panathenaic Way, were conserved and restored. Parts of the Way on the Acropolis were widened and covered in reinforced concrete in 2021, a move intended to improve safety and accessibility.

In 2025, the Panathenaic Way was included in a programme of works in the Agora and Kerameikos, conducted by the Greek Ministry of Culture under the leadership of Lina Mendoni, the Minister for Culture and a former archaeologist, with a budget of €6.8 million. Restoration work in the same year to open the North Slope Trail at the base of the Acropolis restored public access to the final stretch of the route before its ascent of the rock.

== Works cited ==
- Bintliff, John (2012). The Complete Archaeology of Greece: From Hunter-Gatherers to the 20th Century AD. Chichester: Wiley. doi:10.1002/9781118255179. ISBN 978-1-4051-5418-5.
- Broneer, Oscar (1960). "Notes on Three Athenian Cult Places" (PDF). Αρχαιολογική Εφημερίς [Archaeological Newsletter]: 54–67.
- Bur, Tatiana (2025). Technologies of the Marvellous in Ancient Greek Religion. Cambridge Classical Studies. Cambridge University Press. doi:10.1017/9781009331722. ISBN 978-1-009-33172-2.
- Burgers, P. (2001). "Coinage and State Expenditure: The Reign of Claudius AD 41–54". Historia: Zeitschrift für Alte Geschichte. 50 (1): 96–114. JSTOR 4436604.
- Camp, John McK. (2001). The Archaeology of Athens. New Haven: Yale University Press. ISBN 0-300-10151-1.
- Camp, John McK. (2010). The Athenian Agora Site Guide. Photography by Craig A. Mauzy (5th ed.). Princeton: American School of Classical Studies at Athens. ISBN 978-0-87661-657-4.
- Camp, John McK. (2015). "Excavations in the Athenian Agora, 2008–2012". Hesperia. 84 (3): 467–513. doi:10.2972/hesperia.84.3.0467. JSTOR 10.2972/hesperia.84.3.0467.
- Camp, John McK. (2021). "The Agora: Public Life and Administration". In Neils, Jenifer; Rogers, Dylan K. (eds.). The Cambridge Companion to Ancient Athens. Cambridge University Press. pp. 86–97. doi:10.1017/9781108614054.007. ISBN 978-1-108-61405-4.
- Costaki, Leda (2006). The Intra Muros Road System of Ancient Athens (PDF) (PhD thesis). University of Toronto.
- Costaki, Leda (2021). "Urban Archaeology: Uncovering the Ancient City". In Neils, Jenifer; Rogers, Dylan K. (eds.). The Cambridge Companion to Ancient Athens (PDF). Cambridge University Press. pp. 462–481. doi:10.1017/9781108614054. ISBN 978-1-108-61405-4. S2CID 243691800.
- Costaki, Leda; Theocharaki, Anna Maria (2021). "City Streets, Walls and Gates". In Neils, Jenifer; Rogers, Dylan K. (eds.). The Cambridge Companion to Ancient Athens. Cambridge University Press. pp. 47–62. doi:10.1017/9781108614054.005. ISBN 978-1-108-61405-4.
- Davies, John Kenyon (1992). "Society and Economy". In Lewis, David M.; Boardman, John; Davies, John Kenyon; Ostwald, Martin (eds.). The Cambridge Ancient History. Vol. 5 (2nd ed.). Cambridge University Press. pp. 287–305. doi:10.1017/CHOL9780521233477.015. ISBN 0-521-23347-X.
- Dickenson, Christopher P. (2017). On the Agora: The Evolution of a Public Space in Hellenistic and Roman Greece (c. 323 BC – 267 AD). Leiden: Brill. ISBN 978-90-04-33475-5.
- Dillon, Matthew; Garland, Lynda (2005). Ancient Rome: From the Early Republic to the Assassination of Julius Caesar. Abingdon: Routledge. ISBN 978-1-136-76136-2.
- Ficuciello, Laura (2008). Le strade di Atene [The Streets of Athens] (PDF). SATAA (in Italian). Vol. 4. Paestum: Pandemos. ISBN 978-88-87744-14-9.
- Frantz, Alison (1988). Late Antiquity A.D. 267–700 (PDF). The Athenian Agora. Vol. 24. With contributions by John Travlos and Homer A. Thompson. Princeton: The American School of Classical Studies at Athens. ISBN 0-87661-224-9.
- Garland, Robert (2013). "Travel". In Wilson, Nigel (ed.). Encyclopedia of Ancient Greece. New York: Taylor and Francis. pp. 714–715. doi:10.4324/9780203958766. ISBN 978-0-203-95876-6.
- Grant, Michael (1996) [1994]. The Antonines: The Roman Empire in Transition. New York: Routledge. ISBN 0-415-13814-0 – via Internet Archive.
- Immerwahr, Sara Anderson (1971). The Neolithic and Bronze Ages. The Athenian Agora. Vol. 13. Princeton: American School of Classical Studies at Athens. OCLC 412233.
- Knigge, Ursula (1991) [1988]. The Athenian Kerameikos: History, Monuments, Excavations. Translated by Binder, Judith. Athens: Krene Editions. OCLC 28124419. OL 19458554M – via Internet Archive.
- Kroll, John H. (1993). The Greek Coins (PDF). The Athenian Agora. Vol. 26. With contributions by Alan S. Walker. Princeton: The American School of Classical Studies at Athens. ISBN 0-87661-226-5.
- Kyle, Donald G. (1993). Athletics in Ancient Athens. Leiden: Brill. ISBN 90-04-09759-7.
- Lord, Louis E. (1947). A History of the American School of Classical Studies at Athens 1882–1942 (PDF). Cambridge: Harvard University Press. OCLC 648555.
- Manning, Stuart (2010). "Chronology and Terminology". In Cline, Eric (ed.). The Oxford Handbook of the Bronze Age Aegean. Oxford University Press. pp. 11–30. ISBN 978-0-19-536550-4.
- Mauzy, Craig (2006). Agora Excavations 1931–2006: A Pictorial History. Princeton: American School of Classical Studies at Athens. ISBN 978-0-87661-910-0.
- Mikalson, Jon D. (1998). Religion in Hellenistic Athens. Hellenistic Culture and Society. Vol. 29. Berkeley: University of California Press. ISBN 0-520-21023-9.
- Miles, Margaret M.; Neils, Jenifer (2021). "Athenian Festivals". In Neils, Jenifer; Rogers, Dylan K. (eds.). The Cambridge Companion to Ancient Athens. Cambridge University Press. pp. 332–344. doi:10.1017/9781108614054.025. ISBN 978-1-108-61405-4.
- Miller, Stephen G. (1995). "Architecture as Evidence for the Identity of the Early Polis". In Hansen, Mogens Herman (ed.). Sources for the Ancient Greek City-State: Symposium August, 24–27 1994. Acts of the Copenhagen Polis Centre. Vol. 2. Copenhagen: Kgl. Danske Videnskabernes Selskab. pp. 201–244. ISBN 978-87-7304-267-0.
- Neer, Richard T. (2012). Greek Art and Archaeology: A New History, c. 2500 – c. 150 BCE. New York: Thames and Hudson. ISBN 978-0-500-28877-1.
- Nees, Lawrence (2023). Illuminating the Word in the Early Middle Ages. Cambridge University Press. doi:10.1017/9781009193870. ISBN 978-1-009-19387-0.
- Neils, Jenifer (1992). Goddess and Polis: The Panathenaic Festival in Ancient Athens. Princeton University Press. ISBN 0-691-03612-8 – via Internet Archive.
- Neils, Jenifer (2021). "Athens: An Introduction". In Neils, Jenifer; Rogers, Dylan K. (eds.). The Cambridge Companion to Ancient Athens. Cambridge University Press. pp. 1–6. doi:10.1017/9781108614054.001. ISBN 978-1-108-61405-4.
- Ober, Josiah (2018). Athenian Legacies: Essays on the Politics of Going On Together. Princeton University Press. ISBN 978-0-691-19016-7.
- Oberhelman, Steven M. (2013). "Eleusis". In Wilson, Nigel (ed.). Encyclopedia of Ancient Greece. New York: Taylor and Francis. pp. 255–257. doi:10.4324/9780203958766. ISBN 978-0-203-95876-6.
- Osborne, Robin, ed. (2023). The Athenian Empire. LACTOR Sourcebooks in Ancient History. Vol. 1. Cambridge University Press. ISBN 978-1-009-38364-6.
- Reed, Nancy B. (1990). "A Chariot Race for Athens' Finest: The 'Apobates' Contest Re-Examined". Journal of Sport History. 17 (3): 306–317. JSTOR 43609193.
- Rehm, Rush (2020). The Play of Space: Spatial Transformation in Greek Tragedy. Princeton University Press. ISBN 978-1-4008-2507-3.
- Rives, James B. (2024). Animal Sacrifice in the Roman Empire (31 BCE – 395 CE): Power, Communication and Cultural Transformation. Oxford University Press. doi:10.1093/OSO/9780197648919.001.0001. ISBN 978-0-19-764891-9.
- Robertson, Noel (1998). "The City Center of Archaic Athens". Hesperia. 67 (3): 283–302. doi:10.2307/2668475. JSTOR 2668475.
- Samons, Loren J. (2009). "Introduction: Athenian History and Society in the Age of Pericles". In Samons, Loren J. (ed.). The Cambridge Companion to the Age of Pericles. Cambridge University Press. pp. 1–23. doi:10.1017/CCOL9780521807937. ISBN 978-0-521-00389-6.
- Sancisi-Weerdenburg, Heleen (2020). Peisistratos and the Tyranny: A Reappraisal of the Evidence. Publications of the Netherlands Institute at Athens. Vol. 3. Leiden: Brill. ISBN 978-90-50-63416-8.
- Scott, Michael (2018). "Viewing Sparta Through Athenian Engagement with Art and Architecture". In Cartledge, Paul; Powell, Anton (eds.). The Greek Superpower: Sparta in the Self-Definitions of Athenians. Swansea: Classical Press of Wales. pp. 87–114. ISBN 978-1-910589-80-9.
- Shear, Julia L. (2007). "Royal Athenians: The Ptolemies and Attalids at the Panathenaia". In Palagia, Olga; Choremi-Spetsieri, Alkestis (eds.). The Panathenaic Games: Proceedings of an International Conference Held at the University of Athens, May 11–12, 2004. Oxford: Oxbow Books. pp. 135–146. ISBN 978-1-78297-983-8.
- Shear, Julia L. (2021). Serving Athena: The Festival of the Panathenaia and the Construction of Athenian Identities. Cambridge University Press. doi:10.1017/9781108750943. ISBN 978-1-108-48527-2.
- Shear, T. Leslie (1939). "The Campaign of 1938". Hesperia. 8 (3): 201–246. doi:10.2307/146675. JSTOR 146675.
- Shear, T. Leslie (1940). "The Campaign of 1939". Hesperia. 9 (3): 261–308. doi:10.2307/146481. JSTOR 146481.
- Shear, T. Leslie, Jr (1973a). "The Athenian Agora: Excavations of 1971". Hesperia. 42 (2): 121–179. doi:10.2307/147544. JSTOR 147544.
- Shear, T. Leslie, Jr (1973b). "The Athenian Agora: Excavations of 1972". Hesperia. 42 (4): 359–407. doi:10.2307/147463. JSTOR 147463.
- Shear, T. Leslie, Jr (1975). "The Athenian Agora: Excavations of 1973–1974". Hesperia. 44 (4): 331–374. JSTOR 147506.
- Shear, T. Leslie, Jr (1997). "The Athenian Agora: Excavations of 1989–1993". Hesperia. 66 (4): 495–548. doi:10.2307/148466. JSTOR 148466.
- Shelmerdine, Cynthia (2008). "Introduction: Background, Methods and Sources". In Shelmerdine, Cynthia (ed.). The Cambridge Companion to the Aegean Bronze Age. Cambridge University Press. pp. 1–18. doi:10.1017/CCOL9780521814447.001. ISBN 978-1-139-00189-2.
- Sironen, Erkki (1994). "Life and Administration of Late Roman Attica in the Light of Public Inscriptions". In Castrén, Paavo (ed.). Post-Herulian Athens: Aspects of Life and Culture in Athens A.D. 267–529. Helsinki: Finnish Institute at Athens. pp. 15–62. ISBN 978-951-95295-2-3.
- Smith, Helena (10 June 2021). "Acropolis Now: Greeks Outraged at Concreting of Ancient Site". The Guardian.
- Sourvinou-Inwood, Christiane (2003). Tragedy and Athenian Religion. London: Bloomsbury Academic. ISBN 0-7391-0400-4.
- Stewart, Andrew; Frischer, Bernard; Abdelaziz, Mohamed (2022). "Fear and Loathing in the Hellenistic Agora: Antenor's Tyrannicides Return". Hesperia. 91 (2): 311–350. doi:10.2972/hesperia.91.2.0311. JSTOR 48805444.
- Strazdins, Estelle (2019). "The King of Athens: Philostratus' Portrait of Herodes Atticus". Classical Philology. 114 (2): 238–264. JSTOR 26621202.
- Thomas, Rosalind (1996). "Hipparchus". In Hornblower, Simon; Spawforth, Anthony (eds.). The Oxford Classical Dictionary (3rd ed.). Oxford University Press. pp. 707–708. ISBN 0-19-866172-X.
- Thompson, Homer A. (1960). "Activity in the Athenian Agora 1959" (PDF). Hesperia. 28 (1): 91–108. doi:10.2307/147341. JSTOR 147341.
- Thompson, Homer A. (1966). "Activity in the Athenian Agora 1960–1965" (PDF). Hesperia. 35 (1): 37–54. doi:10.2307/147312. JSTOR 147312.
- Thompson, Homer A.; Wycherley, Richard Ernest (1972). The Agora of Athens: The History, Shape and Uses of an Ancient City Centre. The Athenian Agora. Vol. 14. Princeton: American School of Classical Studies at Athens. ISBN 0-87661-214-1. JSTOR 3601981.
- Tomkins, Peter (2010). "Neolithic Antecedents". In Cline, Eric (ed.). The Oxford Handbook of the Bronze Age Aegean. Oxford University Press. pp. 31–52. ISBN 978-0-19-536550-4.
- Travlos, John (1971). Pictorial Dictionary of Ancient Athens. London: Thames and Hudson. ISBN 0-500-05012-0.
- Travlos, John (1981). "Athens After the Liberation: Planning the New City and Exploring the Old". Hesperia. 50 (4): 391–407. doi:10.2307/147880. JSTOR 147880.
- Vanderpool, Eugene (1949). "The Route of Pausanias in the Athenian Agora" (PDF). Hesperia. 18 (1): 128–137. doi:10.2307/147000. JSTOR 147000.
- Wohl, Victoria (1996). "Εὐσεβείας ἕνεκα καὶ φιλοτιμίας: Hegemony and Democracy at the Panathenaia". Classica et Mediaevalia. 47: 25–81. ISBN 978-87-7289-422-5.
- Wycherley, Richard Ernest (2015) [1978]. The Stones of Athens. Princeton University Press. ISBN 978-1-4008-7191-9.
