= Funerary naiskos of Aristonautes =

Ancient Greek tomb

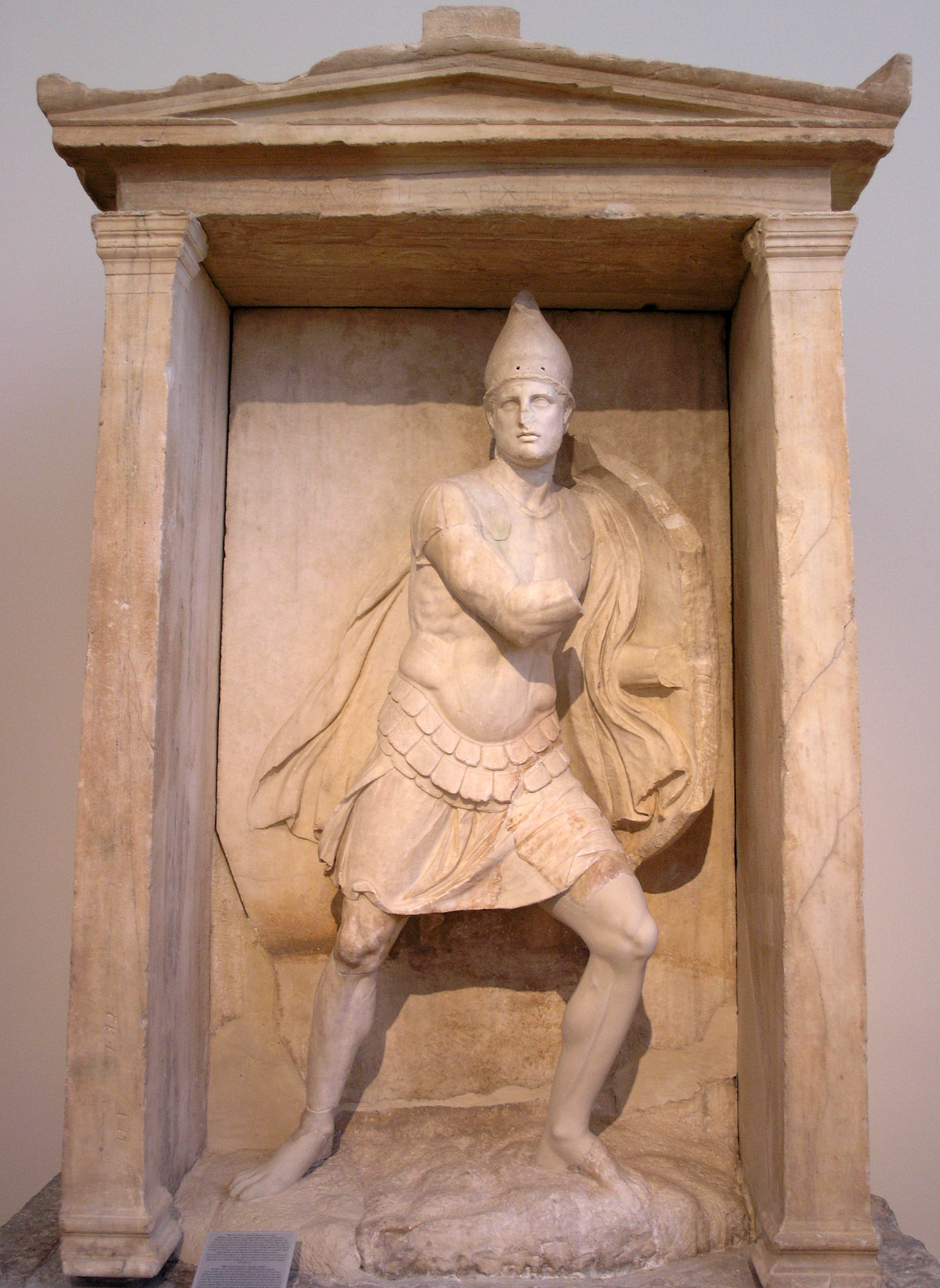

The Funerary naiskos of Aristonautes is a funerary monument dating to around 320 BC, on display in the National Archaeological Museum of Athens (NAMA) with the inventory number 738.

The funerary monument takes the form of a naiskos with a statue inside it and stood near the Dipylon Gate in the Kerameikos, the cemetery of ancient Athens. It was made from Pentelic marble and had a total height of 2.48 m – the statue had a height of 1.55 m. The larger part of the relief survives, though part of the back, the right pilaster, the left foot, and part of the base it stood on as well as the majority of the right leg from the upper ankle to the middle of the foot are reconstructions. Both forearms are largely missing, including the hands.

The man in the naiskos wears the armour of a hoplite and is named by an inscription on the architrave. He is Aristonautes, son of Archenautes, from the deme of Halai (Ἀριστοναύτης Ἀρχεναύτο Ἁλαιεύς). Aristonautes stands with his legs apart, taking up the majority of the ground within the naiskos, with his right foot and face turned towards the viewer. The rest of his body is turned to the left, giving the impression of movement. He is about to attack an opponent. Aristonautes wears a short chiton, a breastplate, a chlamys and a helmet. His left arm bears a shield and it is probable that there was a sword in his right hand. The funerary monument is a work of significance for cultural history. It stands at the transition between classical and Hellenistic art. Scholars are not entirely in agreement about its date, placing it between 350 and 310 BC.

== Bibliography ==
- Nikolaos Kaltsas: Sculpture in the National Archaeological Museum, Athens, The J. Paul Getty Museum, Los Angeles 2002 ISBN 0-89236-686-9, pp. 204–205
