= Pompeion =

Ancient building in Athens, Greece

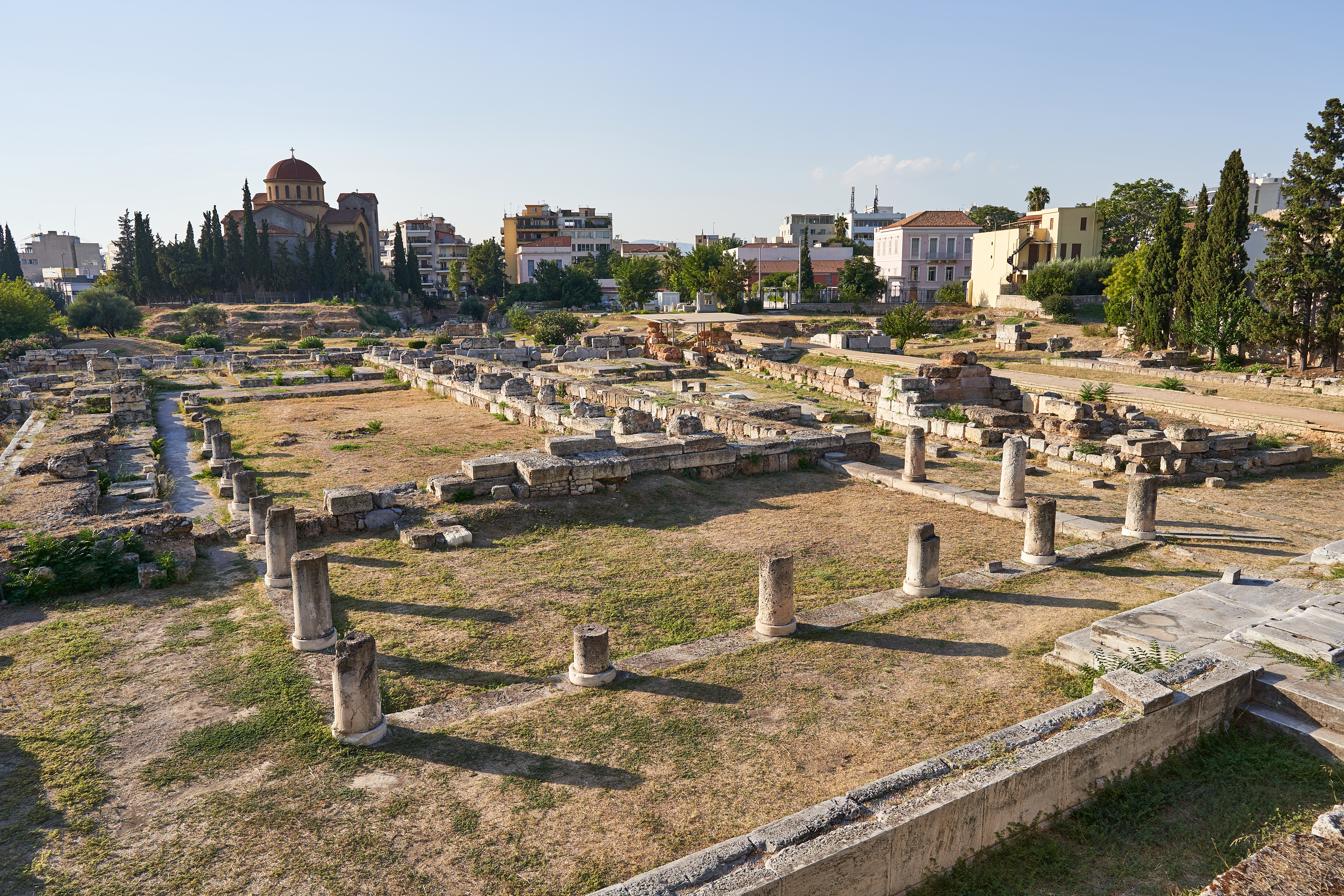
- View of the remains of the Pompeion from the south.
- Interactive map of Pompeion

The Pompeion (Ancient Greek: Πομπεῖον) was a building made of Hymettian marble located in the Kerameikos of Athens between the Sacred Gate and the Dipylon, .

The 4th-century BC building was destroyed during the siege by Sulla. A new Pompeion, of the basilical type, was erected by Antoninus Pius, but was later destroyed by the Heruli.

== Description ==
Plan of the Kerameikos archaeological site.

The Pompeion was located within the city walls, between the Dipylon and the Sacred Gate. The rectangular courtyard, surrounded by colonnaded galleries, served as a palaestra (a sports complex) and as a preparation hall for the Panathenaic processions. The name Pompeion is derived from the word πομπή (pompē), meaning "escort" or "accompaniment", a term used in Ancient Greek for a "parade". The Pompeion was the site for preparing the Lesser Panathenaic procession, which took place annually towards the Acropolis of Athens. During the Great Panathenaea, held every four years, the Athenians prepared the peplos for the cult statue of the goddess Athena at the Pompeion. This peplos was hoisted like a sail on a chariot shaped like a ship before being carried in procession to the Acropolis.

The first building was constructed in 400 BC on foundations of poros stone. The courtyard, measuring 45 × 17 meters, was likely surrounded by wooden columns (6 × 14 columns). Before the completion of this first building shortly after 400 BC, the plan was modified and expanded; on a larger floor plan, the pillars of the halls were built of poros with Ionic capitals made of marble. The entrance to the building was through a monumental gateway (propylon) in marble, featuring four Ionic columns. The central passage was equipped with a ramp, including ruts to guide the wheels of chariots.

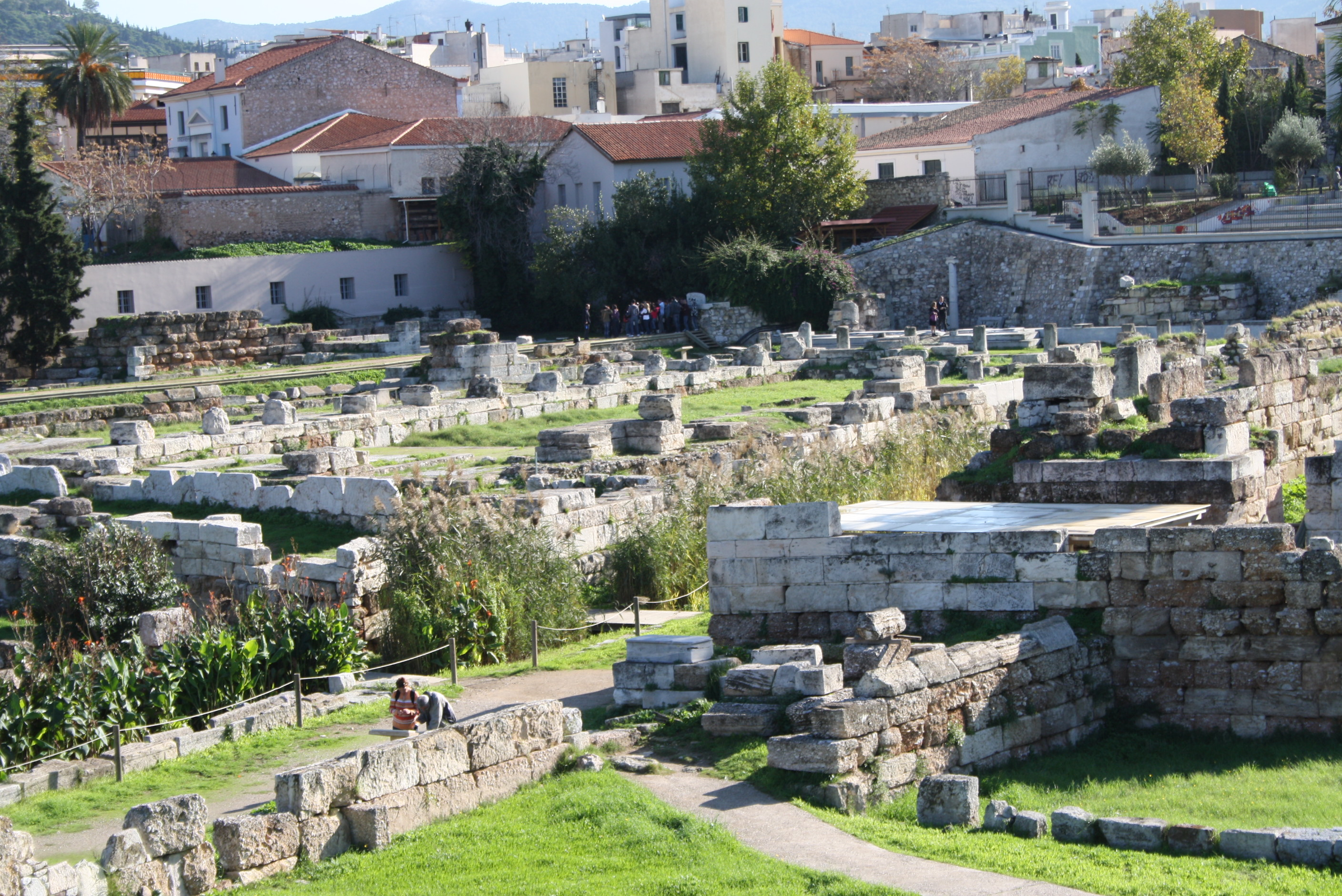
Archaeological site of the Kerameikos, with the Dipylon, the Pompeion, the Eridanos, the Sacred Gate, and the Themistoclean Wall.

Banquet halls and workshops were added to the northwest and northeast sides, which were likely linked to the function of the Pompeion as an official state building for the organization of the Panathenaea. Some annex rooms were provided with pebble mosaics, notably representing animal hunting scenes. Locations for dining couches were provided in the floors of these rooms. Only the prytaneis and archons were authorized to dine with official guests, up to a total of 66 people. Benches stood along the walls of the peristyle.

Subsequent conversions between the 3rd and 1st centuries BC replaced the rammed earth walls with limestone walls, pierced by grilled windows. Inscriptions and sources suggest that the walls of the pillared rooms bore paintings of poets and orators. A bronze statue of Socrates by the sculptor Lysippos is mentioned. Young ephebes were shown figures of exemplary Athenians here for their education.

== Sources ==
- Diogenes Laërtius. Lives and Opinions of Eminent Philosophers – via Perseus Project.
- Hoepfner, Wolfram (1976). Das Pompeion und seine Nachfolgerbauten [The Pompeion and its successor buildings] (in German). Berlin: Walter de Gruyter & Co. ISBN 3-11-005906-1 – via Internet Archive.
- Pausanias (1898). Description of Greece – via Perseus Project.
- Pliny the Elder. Naturalis Historia – via Perseus Project.
- Pseudo-Plutarch. Moralia – via Perseus Project.
