= Agora =

Public space in ancient Greek cities

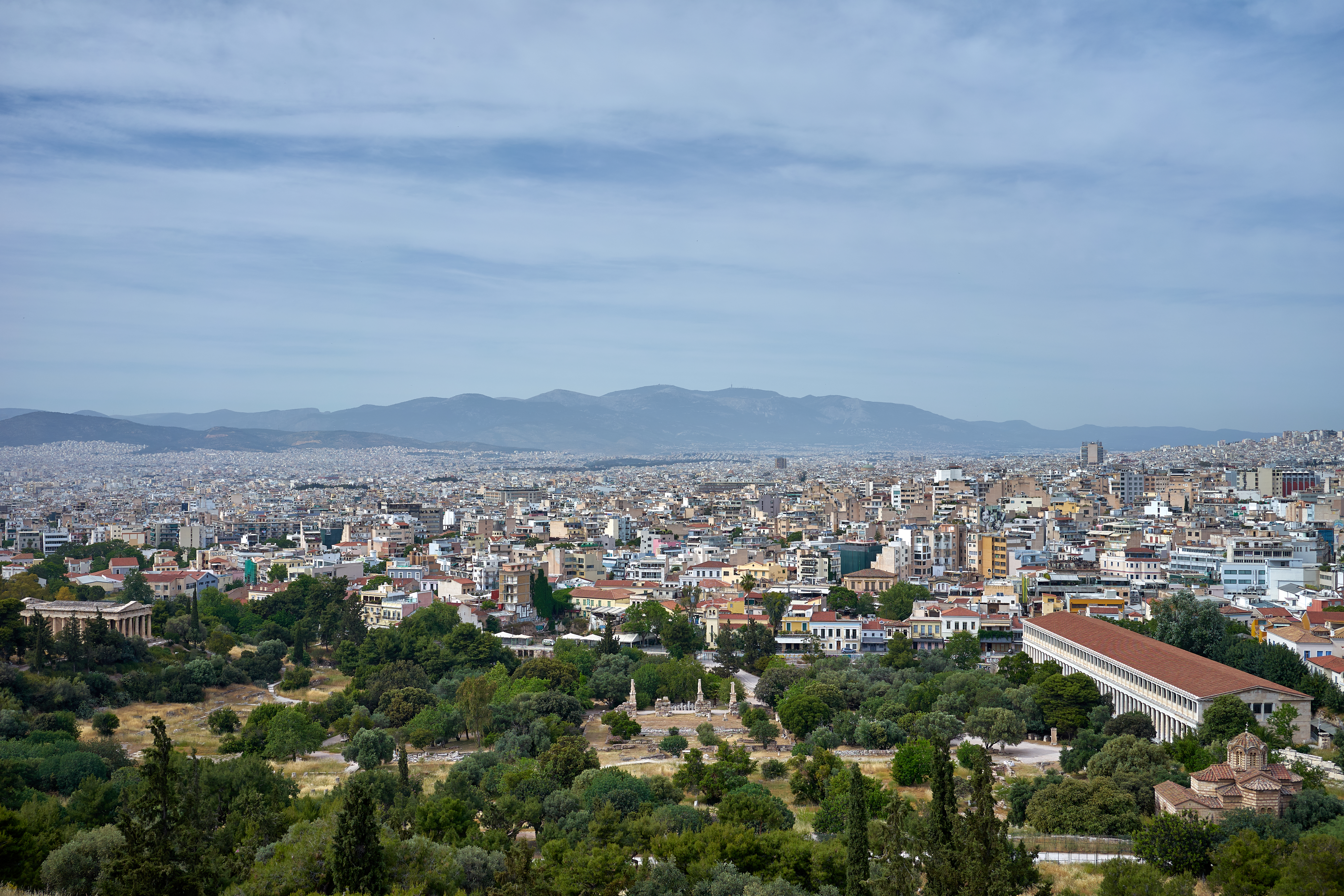
View of the Ancient Agora of Athens in the foreground. The Temple of Hephaestus is to the left and the Stoa of Attalos to the right.

An agora (/ˈæɡ.ə.rə/ or /əˈɡɔː.rə/; Ancient Greek: ἀγορά, romanized: agorá, meaning 'market' in Modern Greek) was a central public space in ancient Greek city-states. The literal meaning of the word agora is 'gathering place' or 'assembly'. The agora was the centre of the athletic, artistic, business, social, spiritual, and political life in the city. The Ancient Agora of Athens is the best example.

== Origins ==
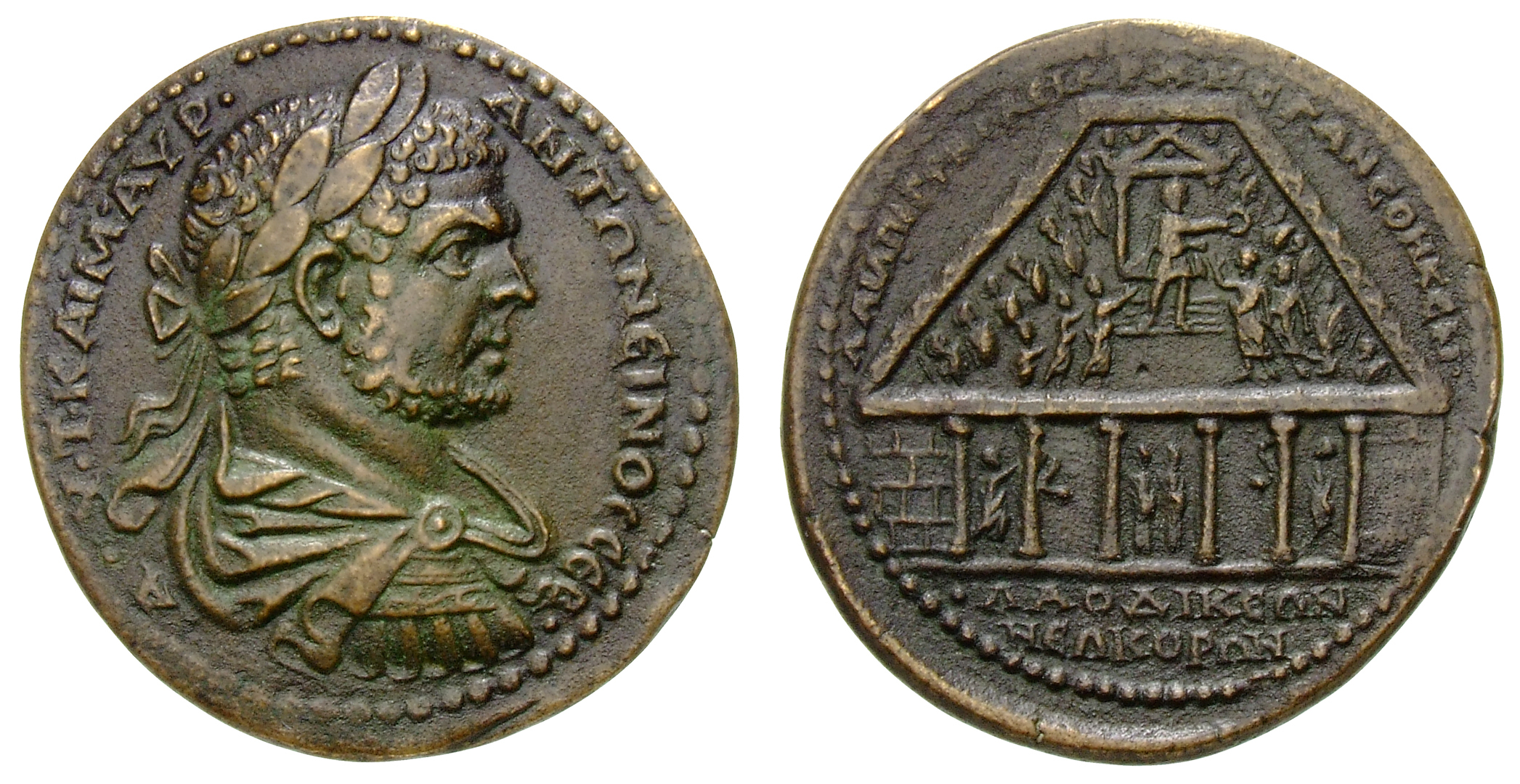
Bronze Roman medal (45 mm, 45.6 g) showing Caracalla's portrait and the emperor being greeted by city's citizens in the Agora during his visit to Laodicea ad Lycum (216/217 AD), in front of a two-columned temple with soldiers lined up on both sides.

Early in Greek history (10th–4th centuries BC), free-born citizens would gather in the agora for military duty or to hear statements of the ruling king or council. Later, the agora also served as a marketplace, where merchants kept stalls or shops to sell their goods amid arcades. This attracted artisans who built workshops nearby.

From these twin functions of the agora as a political and a commercial spot came the two Greek verbs ἀγοράζω, agorázō, "I shop", and ἀγορεύω, agoreúō, "I speak in public".

== Ancient Agora of Athens ==
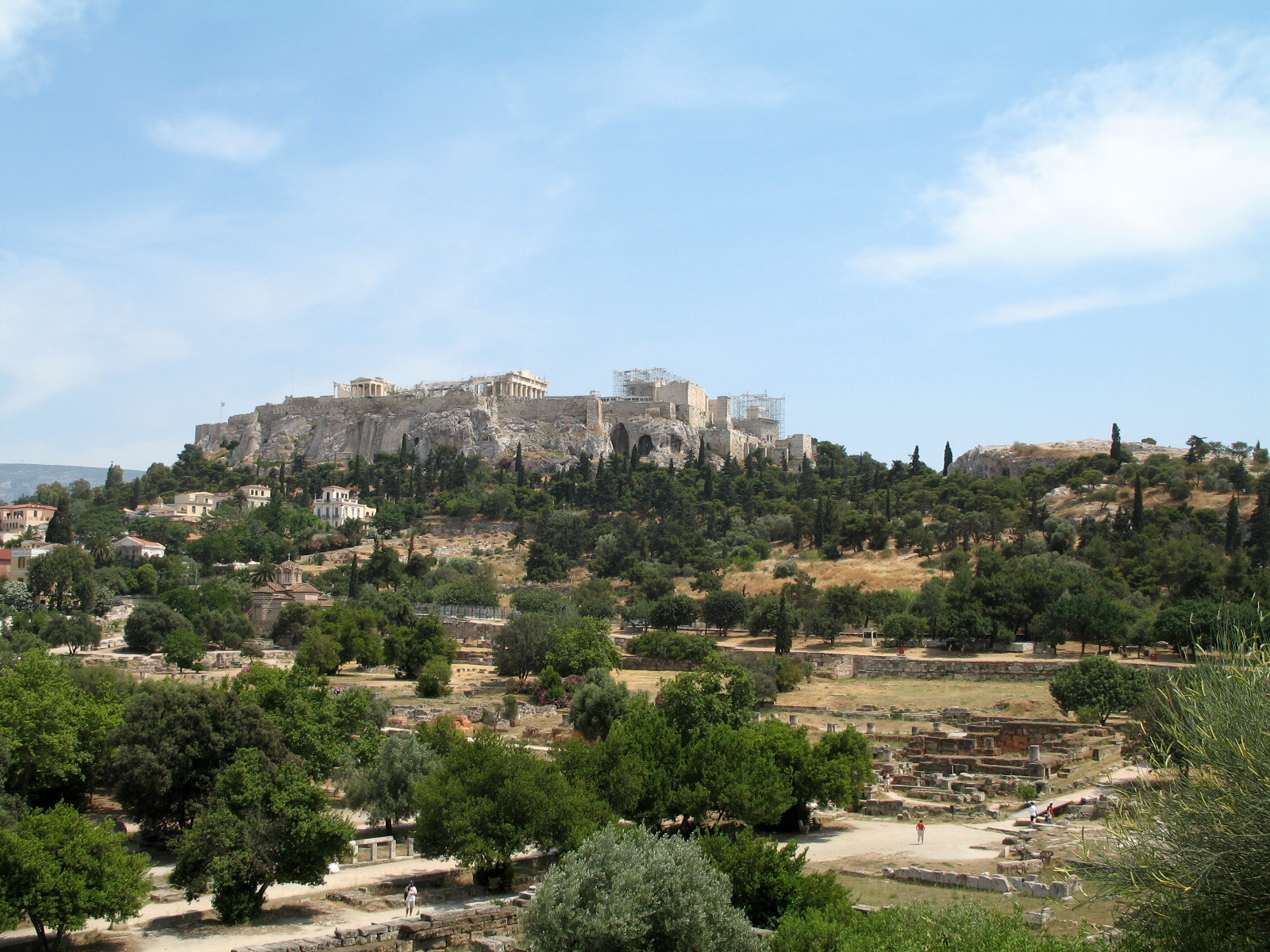
The Athenian agora today

The Ancient Agora of Athens was situated beneath the northern slope of the Acropolis. The Ancient Agora was the primary meeting ground for Athenians, where members of democracy congregated affairs of the state, where business was conducted, a place to hang out, and watch performers and listen to famous philosophers. The importance of the Athenian agora revolved around religion. The agora was a very sacred place, in which holiness is laid out in the architecture of the ground upon which it lay. The layout of the agora was centred around the Panathenaic Way, a road that ran through the middle of Athens and to the main gate of the city, Dipylon. This road was considered tremendously sacred, serving as a travel route for the Panathenaic festival, which was held in honour of the goddess Athena every four years. The agora was also famously known for housing the Temple of Hephaestus, the Greek god of metalworking and craftsmen. This temple is still in great condition to this day. Other temples priorly standing in the agora include honour for Zeus, Athena, Apollo, and Ares.

== Location and constituents ==
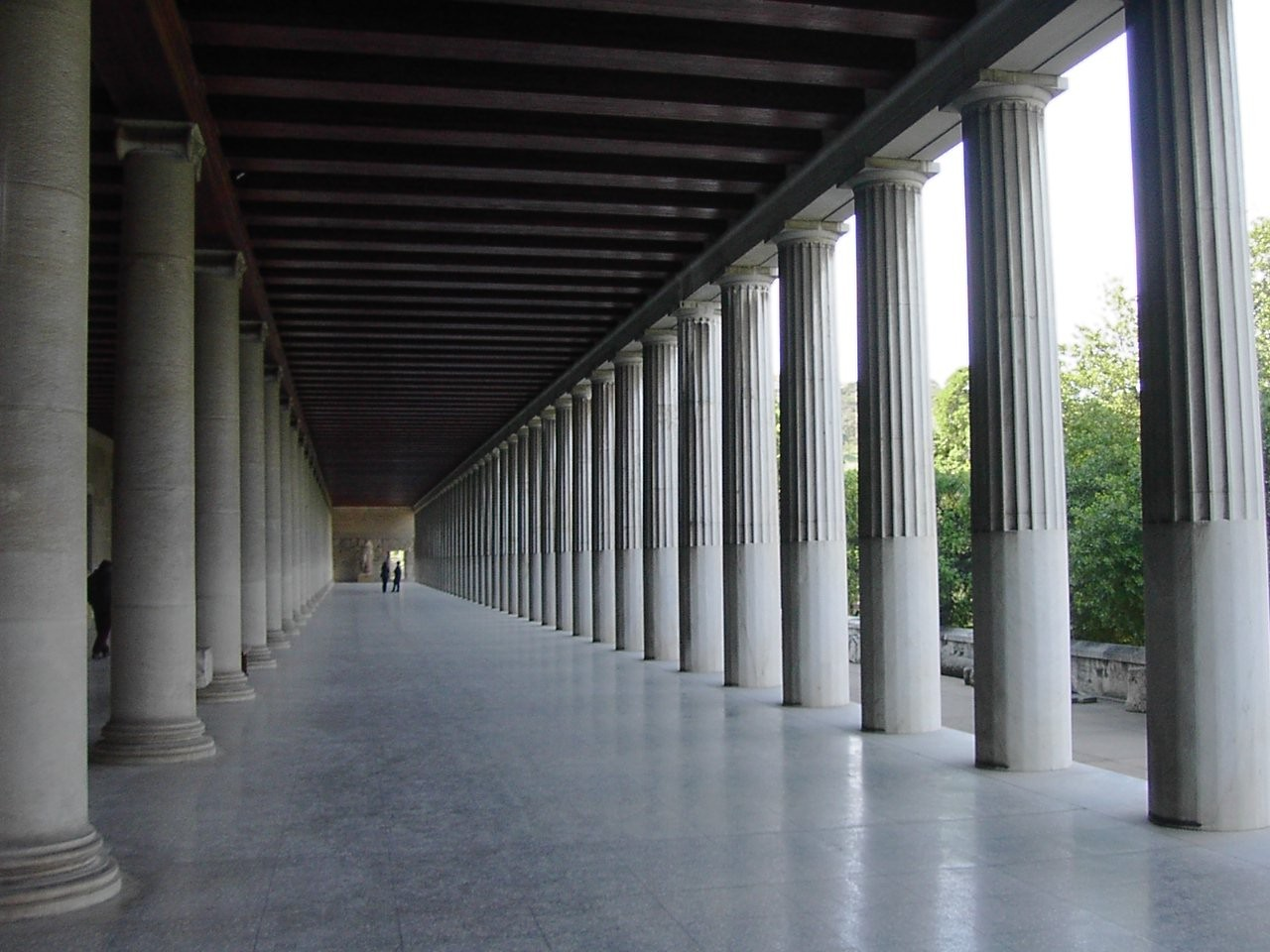
The reconstructed Stoa of Attalos

The agora was usually located in the middle of a city or near the harbour. Agoras were built of colonnades, or rows of long columns, and contained stoae, also known as a long open walkway below the colonnades. They were beautifully decorated with fountains, trees, and statues. When the Athenian agora was rebuilt after the Greco-Persian Wars, colonnades and stoae were not incorporated.

== Phobia ==
The term agoraphobia denotes a phobic condition in which the sufferer becomes anxious in unfamiliar environments – for instance, places where they perceive that they have little control. Such anxiety may be triggered by wide-open spaces, crowds, or public situations, and the psychological term derives from the agora as a large and open gathering place.

== See also ==
- Forum (Roman)
- Agorism
- Platonic Academy
