= Sacred Gate =

Gate in the city wall of Classical Athens

Layout of the gate complex of Kerameikos in c. 300 BC, including the Dipylon, the Sacred Gate, and the Pompeion

The Sacred Gate (Greek: Ἱερὰ Πύλη, Hiera Pyle) was a gate in the city wall of Classical Athens, in the modern neighbourhood of Kerameikos. Its name derives from the Sacred Way that led from it to Eleusis, the site of the Eleusinian Mysteries. The site is uniquely well preserved for Athens, and shows clear evidence of the successive building phases from the 5th century BC to the 1st century AD. The Eridanos river passed through the gate in a channel.

== Sources ==
- Knigge, Ursula (1988). Der Kerameikos von Athen. Führung durch Ausgrabungen und Geschichte [The Kerameikos of Athens. Tour through Excavations and History] (in German). Krene Verlag.
