= John McK. Camp =

American archaeologist (born 1946)

- Born: John McKesson Camp II; February 8, 1946 (age 80); New York City, U.S.
- Known for: Excavations of the Ancient Agora of Athens
- Awards: Gold Medal of the Archaeological Institute of America (2024)

Academic background
- Education: Harvard University (BA); Princeton University (MA, PhD)

Academic work
- Discipline: Classical archaeology
- Institutions: American School of Classical Studies at Athens; Randolph–Macon College

John McKesson Camp II (usually referred to as John McK. Camp, born February 8, 1946 in New York City) is an American classical archaeologist.

== Education and career ==
Camp studied at Harvard University, where he received his BA in 1968. He continued his studies at Princeton University, earning a MA in 1972 and his PhD in 1977.

Since 1966, Camp has worked on the excavations conducted by the American School of Classical Studies at Athens at the Ancient Agora of Athens. He became the assistant director of the excavations in 1973 and has served as the director since 1994. Concurrently, he held the position of Mellon Professor at the American School of Classical Studies from 1985 to 1996. Since 1996, he has been a professor at Randolph–Macon College in Ashland, Virginia.

He is a corresponding member of the German Archaeological Institute and a Fellow of the Society of Antiquaries of London. In January 2024, Camp was awarded the Gold Medal of the Archaeological Institute of America. A 2015 review of a Festschrift in his honor called him "one of today’s best-known archaeologists and ... the foremost expert on the topography of Athens and Attica".
