= T. Leslie Shear =

American archaeologist (1880–1945)

Theodore Leslie Shear
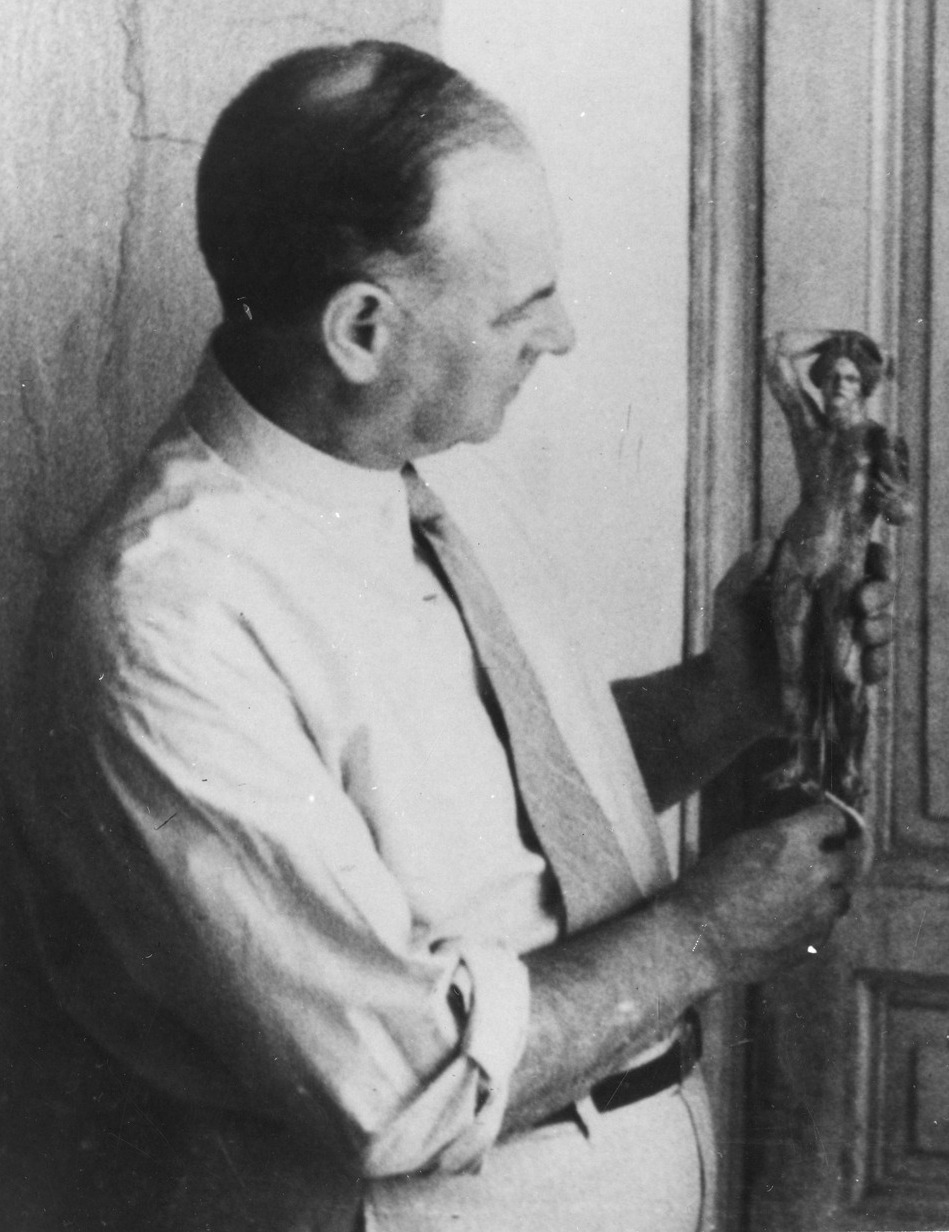
- Photographed in 1936 with a statue of the Apollo Lykeios type
- Born: August 11, 1880; New London, New Hampshire
- Died: July 3, 1945 (aged 64); Lake Sunapee
- Resting place: Princeton Cemetery, Princeton, New Jersey
- Spouses: Nora Jenkins (m. 1907; died 1927) Josephine Platner (m. 1931)
- Children: 2, including T. Leslie Shear, Jr.

Academic background
- Education: New York University; Johns Hopkins University; University of Bonn
- Thesis: The Influence of Plato on Saint Basil (1904)
- Influences: Maurice Bloomfield; Basil L. Gildersleeve; Bert Hodge Hill; Georg Loeschcke; Ernest Gottlieb Sihler

Academic work
- Institutions: American School of Classical Studies at Athens; Barnard College; Columbia University; Princeton University
- Military career
- Allegiance: United States
- Branch: Aviation Section, U.S. Signal Corps
- Rank: 1st Lieutenant
- Wars: First World War

Theodore Leslie Shear (August 11, 1880 – July 3, 1945) was an American classical archaeologist, who directed excavations of the ancient Greek city of Corinth and the Agora of Athens.

Born in New London, New Hampshire, Shear was educated at New York University and at Johns Hopkins University in Baltimore. His doctoral thesis and several of his early publications focused on ancient Greek philosophy, but he gradually shifted his focus towards classical archaeology, following an early fellowship at the American School of Classical Studies at Athens (ASCSA). He excavated at Knidos and at Sardis, both in Asia Minor, before the First World War.

After wartime service as an officer in the Aviation Section of the U.S. Signal Corps, Shear returned to academia, moving to Princeton University in 1921. He was made director of the ASCSA's excavations at Corinth in 1924, having negotiated a funding arrangement to allow their resumption which included the donation of $10,000 (equivalent to $188,000 in 2025) of his own money. He excavated there each season between 1925 and 1931, when he began conducting the ASCSA excavations in the Athenian Agora. These continued until the end of the 1940 season, when the Second World War forced their postponement. During the war, he assisted the Office of Strategic Services in its intelligence work. He died of a stroke in 1945, while on holiday at Lake Sunapee.

Shear's excavations in the Agora uncovered several of its structures, and were praised as a landmark in the scientific practice of archaeology; he was also credited with training many of America's classical archaeologists through his work at Corinth and in Athens. His two wives, Nora Jenkins and Josephine Platner, collaborated with him on his excavations, and his son, T. Leslie Shear, Jr., also served as director of the Agora excavations.

== Early life and career ==
Theodore Leslie Shear was born in New London, New Hampshire, on August 11, 1880. He was educated at Halsey Collegiate School, a preparatory school for boys in New York, before studying at New York University, from which he obtained a bachelor's degree in 1900 and M.A., largely supervised by Ernest Gottlieb Sihler, in 1903. He took his doctorate in 1904 at Johns Hopkins University in Baltimore. His doctoral thesis, which he published in 1906, was titled The Influence of Plato on Saint Basil; in it, he argued that the fourth-century CE bishop Basil of Caesarea had known the work of the ancient Greek philosopher Plato directly, rather than through second-hand contact with his work in that of the Church Fathers. In the acknowledgements, Shear thanked his teachers, including the philologists Basil L. Gildersleeve and Maurice Bloomfield, and credited Gildersleeve with particular influence upon his work.

For the 1904–1905 academic year, Shear was the University Fellow of the American School of Classical Studies at Athens (ASCSA), an archaeological research institute and one of Greece's foreign schools of archaeology. He spent the 1905–1906 academic year in postdoctoral study at the University of Bonn, under Georg Loeschcke. He took a post teaching Greek and Latin at Barnard College, a private women's college in New York, in 1906; his supervisor there was Charles Knapp. In 1910, he moved to Columbia University, where he taught Greek as an associate professor until 1923. Over the course of his career, he took an increasing interest in classical archaeology, rather than the literary studies with which he had begun. In 1911, he took part in trial excavations at Knidos in Asia Minor; (Note: Hood 1998, p. 174. For the nature of the excavations, see Transactions and Proceedings of the American Philological Association, 1911, p. xiv–xv.) he also participated in the excavations of Sardis under Howard Crosby Butler. (Note: Hood 1998, p. 174. For the dates of the Sardis excavations, see Luke 2019, p. 42.) Shear joined in 1914, the excavation's fifth season and the last before it was postponed on the outbreak of the First World War.

Shear married Nora Jenkins, an artist and archaeologist educated at the École du Louvre in Paris, in 1907: they had a daughter, Chloe Louise Smith. The couple sailed around the eastern Mediterranean on a small yacht; they were on Rhodes in May 1912, when the Ottoman garrison surrendered the island to invading Italian forces. (Note: Hood 1998, p. 174. For the date of the surrender, see Smith 2008, p. xiv.)

During the First World War, which the United States entered in 1917, Shear was an officer in the Aviation Section of the U.S. Signal Corps, reaching the rank of first lieutenant. He was consulted on strategic matters concerning the Mediterranean, on the basis of his knowledge of the area. In 1921, he became a lecturer in classics at Princeton University in New Jersey. Butler resumed his excavations at Sardis in 1922, but died of malaria during the season; Shear took over as director for the remainder of the season, and his wife Nora illustrated his publication of the excavation results. A small geometric and classical site had been discovered in 1921 on Mount Hymettus near Athens by J. M. Prindle of Harvard University; (Note: Blegen 1922, p. 4 (for the details of the discovery); Lord 1947, p. 148; Hood 1998, p. 174 (for the details of the site).) Carl Blegen, then assistant director of the ASCSA, made an exploratory excavation there in 1923. Shear excavated the site in 1924, meeting the project's expenses from his own money.

== Excavations of Corinth ==
The archaeological site of Corinth, with buildings colored by time period: Archaic period (c. 800 – c. 510 BCE) Classical period (c. 510–323 BCE) Hellenistic period (323–146 BCE) Roman period (146 BCE–c. 500 CE) Modern period (museum)

In 1924, Shear negotiated the resumption of the ASCSA's excavations at Corinth, an ancient city near the isthmus between the Peloponnese and central Greece, which had been halted since 1915. (Note: The excavations had begun in 1896, but been paused between 1915 and 1925.) Shear offered to pay a total of $10,000 (equivalent to $188,000 in 2025) over two years, on the condition that the ASCSA would allocate to the project a donation of the same size that had previously been given by the banker J. P. Morgan Jr. for excavations, "preferably at Corinth", and a donation of $1,000 (equivalent to $19,000 in 2025) from Morgan's wife, Jane Norton Grew. He donated $6,000 (equivalent to $109,000 in 2025) in the 1925–1926 academic year towards the project, of which $5000 (equivalent to $91,000 in 2025) was to be used to build a house named after him.

The original plan for the Corinth excavation was for Shear to excavate in the area of the theater, while Bert Hodge Hill, the ASCSA's director, would excavate the city's agora. (Note: Lord lists Shear among Hill's "many pupils", though Shear was never formally his student.) However, a shortage of workers meant that the two excavations had to follow each other, with Shear's commencing first. He began excavating on March 9, 1925, with the assistance of Nora Shear, Oscar Broneer, Charles Alexander Robinson Jr., and Richard Stillwell, who served as the excavation's architect. Shear constructed a railway to move the excavation's spoil heaps outside the city walls, 500 metres (550 yd) north of their previous location. In April of the same year, he began excavating the site of a large dwelling, known as the "Shear Villa", in the area known as Kokkinovrysi in the northwest quarter of the city. (Note: Shear 1930, p. 15. For the name, see Sanders, Palinkas & Tzonou-Herbst 2018, p. 143.) (Note: Shear considered that the original phases of the building predated the Roman capture and destruction of Corinth in 146 BCE, and that it was rebuilt after 46 BCE and used throughout the ensuing Roman period.)

During the 1926 season, Shear excavated at Corinth from March until July, with Nora Shear, Broneer, Stillwell (now employed as the excavation's architect), Edward Capps Jr., and John Day, a fellow of the ASCSA. Shear established the location of the Sanctuary of Athena Chalinitis, a major objective of the Corinth project, which was known from the travelogues of the second-century CE Greek writer Pausanias. He also cleared the orchestra and skene of the theater. Shear was accompanied on the initial seasons by Nora, who with him reorganized the site's museum. (Note: Lord gives the date of this work as 1926, Kourelis gives 1927.) There was no excavation in 1927, and Nora Shear died in that year of pneumonia. Shear dedicated his publication of the "Shear Villa", to which she had contributed watercolor reproductions of the site's mosaics, to her memory.

In 1928, Shear was promoted to become professor of classical archaeology at Princeton; in the same year, he became a vice-president of the Archaeological Institute of America. Also in 1928, the ASCSA's new director, Rhys Carpenter, took over overall direction of the Corinth excavations. Shear's season ran from February 22 to June 6; he excavated the east parodos of the theater, as well as a paved road to its east, and made small-scale excavations at the Sanctuary of Athena Chalinitis. He also excavated thirty-three graves in a cemetery northwest of the theater, which had previously been discovered by Hill and William Bell Dinsmoor in 1915. Between February 20 and July 15, 1929, he excavated with Stillwell and Ferdinand Joseph Maria de Waele, a Belgian-born archaeologist who had been given a part-time position as "Special Assistant in Archaeology" at the ASCSA. They cleared the central area of the theater's cavea and the west parodos, and discovered a road running along the building's western side. At the northeastern edge of the theater, Shear discovered an inscription crediting one Erastus for laying the paving, and suggested that this may have been the Erastus of Corinth named by Paul the Apostle in his Epistle to the Romans. (Note: Lord 1947, p. 212. On de Waele, see Vogeikoff-Brogan 2021.) He also excavated an intramural cemetery dating to the fourth and third centuries BCE in the eastern part of the city, and further graves in the North Cemetery; his work here established that it had been used as a burial ground since the Middle Helladic (that is, since at least c. 1550 BCE).

In the campaign of 1930, which ran from January 27 to May 10, Shear excavated a further 235 graves in the North Cemetery and 113 at another nearby site, known as Cheliotomylos. In the process, he confirmed the suggestion made earlier by Blegen that Corinth had been inhabited on a large scale during the Neolithic period. In total, his excavations uncovered over 460 graves, though most had been looted either in antiquity or in modern times, and finds dating to periods from the Neolithic to the 5th century BCE.

== Athens and later life ==
Plan of the Agora of Athens, with buildings as at the end of the 2nd century CE: Archaic period (c. 800 – c. 510 BCE) Classical period (c. 510–323 BCE) Hellenistic period (323–146 BCE) Roman period

At the end of May 1930, Shear left Corinth for the Athenian Agora, where he had been appointed to lead the ASCSA's excavations. The project had been entrusted to the ASCSA after the Greek parliament voted, in 1925, that it would not undertake the work itself, owing to the large cost of purchasing and demolishing the 365 modern houses that made up the neighborhood of Vrysaki, constructed on top of the site. In 1930, Shear arranged for the photographic documentation of the neighborhood, under the excavation's photographer, Hermann Wagner, and a Greek photographer named Messinesi. The Agora excavations became one of the largest archaeological projects in Greece.

Although the initial plan was for Shear to serve as the project's field director, under Rhys Carpenter as general director, Carpenter was never appointed, and Shear had total control over the excavations. These began in 1931, largely funded by John D. Rockefeller Jr. Work in the first few years focused on the western side of the excavation zone, at the foot of the Kolonos Agoraios, where excavators of the German Archaeological Institute at Athens and the Archaeological Society of Athens had already conducted limited excavations in the 1890s and 1900s. The first season consisted of ten weeks' work from May 25 and saw the removal of 7,000 short tons (6,400 t) of earth. Also in 1931, Shear returned to Corinth to make further excavations of tombs in Cheliotomylos, though his wife, Josephine Platner Shear, supervised most of the actual digging.

The 1932 season was more substantial; excavation was conducted for a period of six months. The work uncovered the Stoa Basileios, the Agora's Great Drain, and the Stoa of Zeus Eleutherios, as well as a statue of the Roman emperor Hadrian believed to be that described by Pausanias as standing in front of the latter building. During the 1933 season, which ran from February to July, parts of the Bouleuterion were uncovered, as well as inscriptions placing the Metroon in the area south and east of the Stoa Basileios, and parts of the late Roman Valerian Wall. In the excavation season between January 22 and May 12, 1934, he uncovered the Tholos, secured the location of the Bouleuterion and the Metroon, and identified the Temple of Apollo Patroos and the Altar of the Twelve Gods. The 1935 season closed on June 29: by this point, around half of the site had been cleared, and the total inventoried discoveries included almost 600 items of sculpture, over 6,000 pieces of pottery, and over 41,000 coins. In 1936, he became a trustee of the ASCSA, a position he held until 1942.

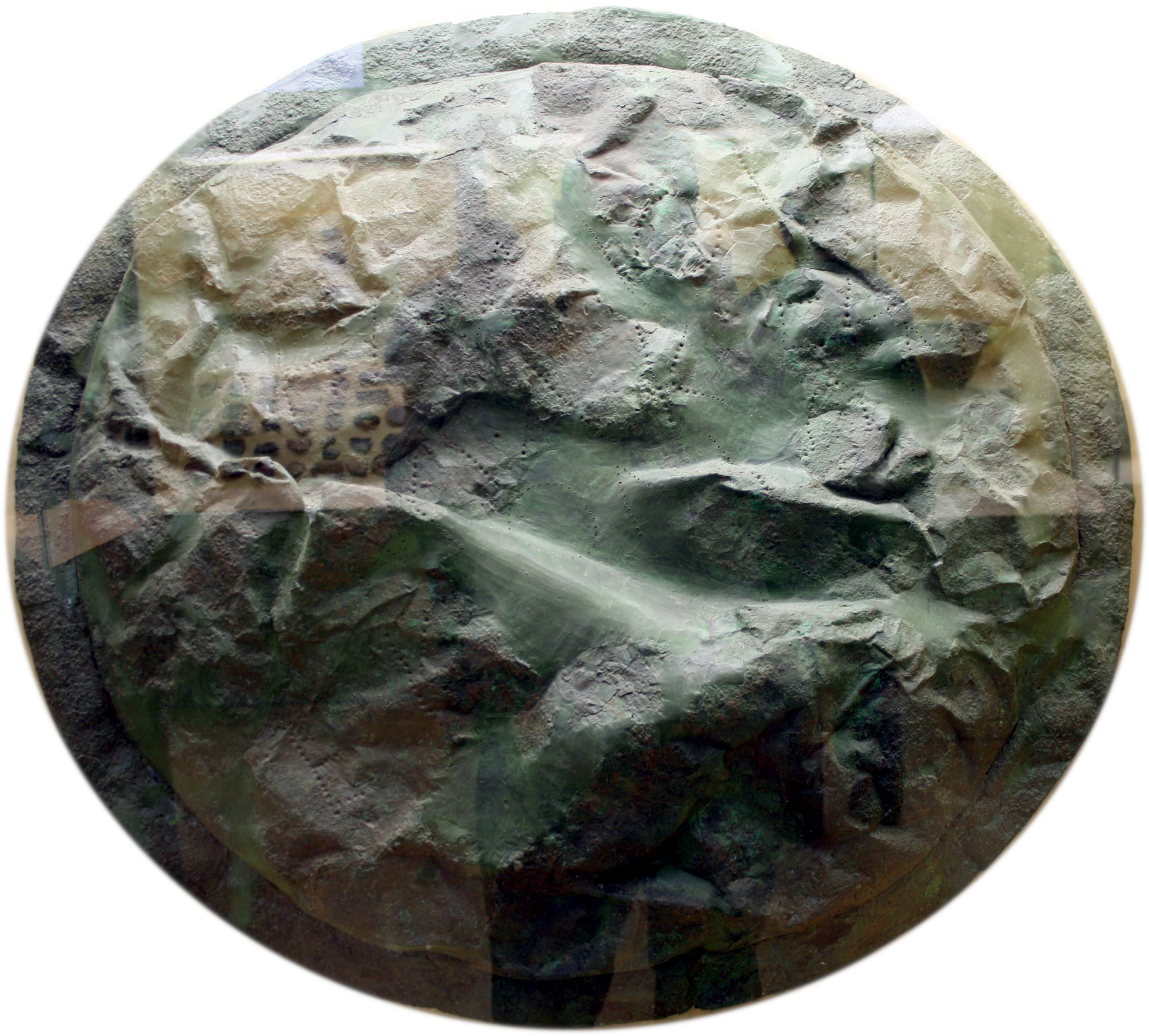
The shield, found by Shear's excavations in 1936, originally taken by the Athenians from the Spartans after the Battle of Pylos in 425 BCE

By the 1936 season, which ran between January 27 and June 13, the excavations were conducted over eight different locations. This campaign uncovered the Odeon of Agrippa and a fountain-house identified as the Enneakrounos, as well as parts of the Monument to the Tyrannicides and a shield taken as plunder after the Battle of Pylos in 425 BCE. Between January 25 and June 1937, Shear excavated around the Temple of Hephaestus, determining the date of the Valerian Wall and uncovering the location and footprint of the Temple of Ares, as well as several items of Early and Middle Helladic pottery. In the 1938 season, between January 24 and June 18, the course of the Panathenaic Way was plotted.

Shear expected the 1939 season to be the last major campaign of digging required, and during it 56,000 tons of earth were cleared, more than in any other year. The excavations largely concentrated on the lower slope of the Areopagus hill, where a Mycenaean chamber tomb believed by to have been built by one of the kings of Athens was uncovered. Ground was also cleared for the construction of a new museum, under the direction of Rodney Young, but was delayed by Young's discovery of ancient tombs in the area.

These tombs were further investigated during a five-week campaign in 1940, which began on April 26. Shear remained in Athens after the outbreak of the Battle of France in May 1940, when US citizens were advised to leave Greece; he continued to lecture at the ASCSA and was photographed with other archaeologists with George II of Greece on May 11. On May 16, the day after the surrender of the Netherlands, Shear gave instructions for the excavations to be halted: artifacts were handed over to the Greek government and stored in the National Archaeological Museum, while records were photographed, duplicates sent to Princeton, and the originals placed in a bomb-proof shelter in the ASCSA's Gennadeion library. Seventeen of the Agora's seventy-three archaeologists had left by May 23; Shear left shortly after the fall of Belgium on May 28, flying to Italy before boarding a ship for New York, which left the Mediterranean shortly before Italy entered the war on June 10.

During the Second World War, Shear worked as a consultant to the Foreign Nationalities Branch of the Office of Strategic Services, the US military intelligence agency which employed several of his ASCSA colleagues, including Alison Frantz and Carl Blegen. (Note: Thompson 1945, p. 43. On the FNB and the OSS, see Allen 2011, esp. p. 237 (on Frantz and Blegen).) He was also a director of the Greek War Relief Association, a philanthropic organization which delivered aid to Greece during its occupation by the Axis. He died on July 3, 1945, of a stroke suffered while on holiday at Lake Sunapee in New Hampshire, and was buried at Princeton Cemetery. (Note: Commemorative Studies in Honor of Theodore Leslie Shear, 1949, preface. For the location of Shear's grave, see "Princeton Cemetery". Nassau Presbyterian Church.)

== Assessment, legacy, and personal life ==
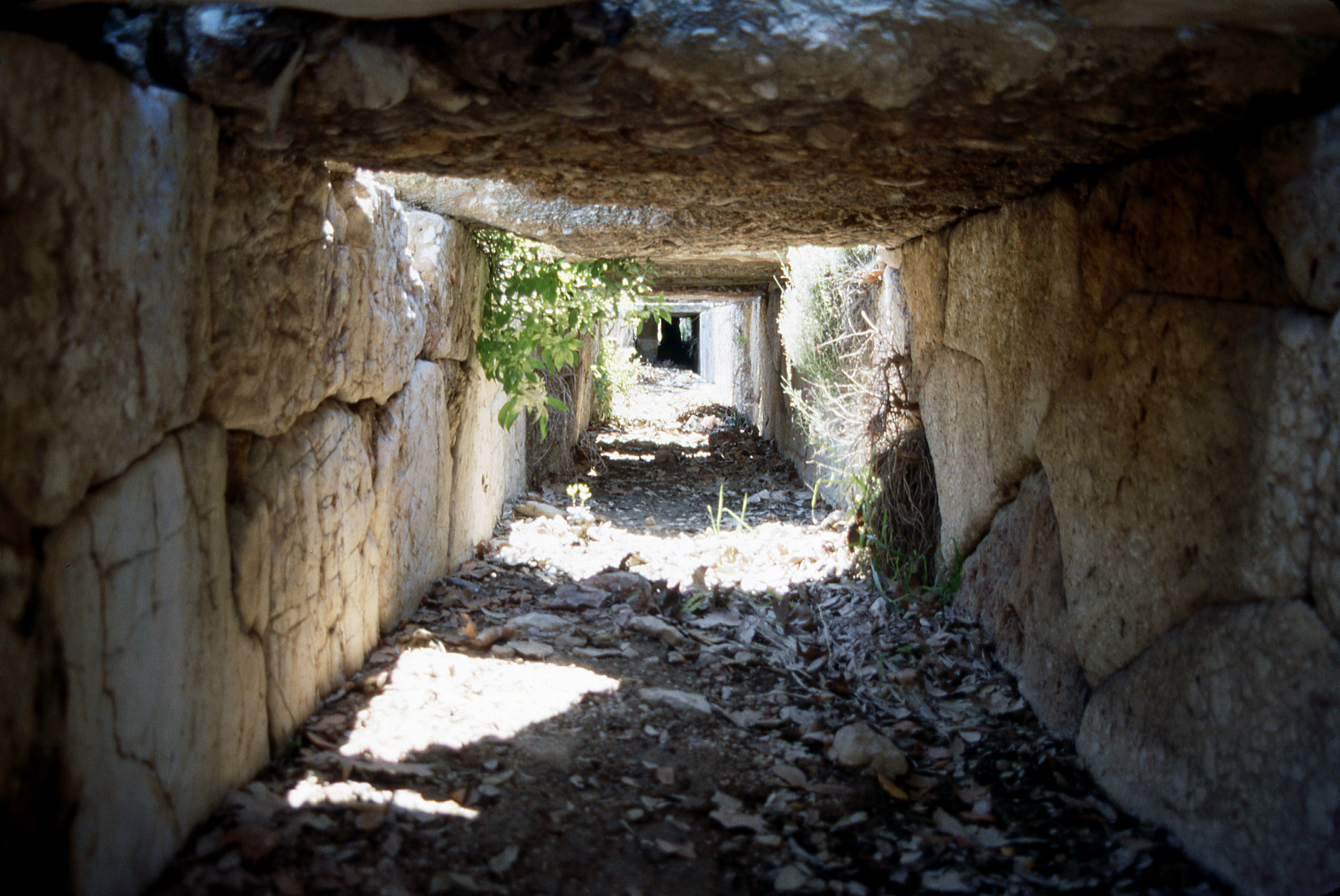
The Great Drain in the Agora of Athens, discovered by Shear in 1931

In a 1998 biography, Rachel Hood credited Shear with training "a generation of young scholars" through the Corinth excavations, and with recording the finds from the Agora in "hitherto unsurpassed detail". In 1949, the British classicist John Manuel Cook called him one of the "great men" of the American School; Stephen L. Dyson, in 2016, called him "one of the most active classical archaeologists of his generation". A Festschrift in his honor was published by the ASCSA in 1949, having been in production since shortly after his death. (Note: Commemorative Studies in Honor of Theodore Leslie Shear, 1949, preface)

The classicist and historian of the ASCSA Louis E. Lord praised the care with which Shear excavated in the Agora, pointing to his collection and cataloguing of over a thousand stamped amphora handles from the Mycenaean period, as well as his training of many young archaeologists through the project. Shear's staff in the Agora included Homer A. Thompson, Eugene Vanderpool, Benjamin Meritt, Dorothy Burr, Virginia Grace, Lucy Talcott, Alison Frantz, Piet de Jong and John Travlos, all of whom were or became noted figures in Greek archaeology. Lord named the Agora excavation as the greatest achievement of the ASCSA. The excavation entailed the total demolition of the neighborhood of Vrysaki, previously home to around 5,000 people. The archaeological historian Yannis Hamilakis has described the expropriation as a colonialist and capitalist enterprise, whose terms were "patently unjust and unfair" to the mostly poor residents of the demolished areas.

Shear remarried in 1931, to Josephine Platner, also an archaeologist. She excavated with him at Corinth, supervising in 1931 the excavation of a second-century CE Roman tomb known as the "Shear Painted Tomb", and in Athens, where she was in charge of the excavation's numismatic finds. Their son, Theodore Leslie Shear Jr., was born in 1938, and also became an archaeologist. The younger Shear followed his father as director of the Agora excavations, leading them between 1968 and 1993.

Shear's son recalled that he affected a formal, reserved demeanor: he tended to excavate in a suit and tie. In his private life, he enjoyed drinking cocktails and had interests in stamp collecting and American football – he supported the Princeton Tigers and attended their games whenever he could. He had two Samoyed dogs, and kept a photograph of them on his desk. He owned a gray Cadillac convertible coupé, which he donated to the International Committee of the Red Cross in 1939.

== Published works ==
- Shear, T. Leslie (1904). The Influence of Plato on Saint Basil (PhD thesis). Johns Hopkins University.
- — (1909). "The Discoveries in Crete". The Classical Weekly. 2 (29): 242–244. doi:10.2307/4386059. JSTOR 4386059.
- — (1913). "Inscriptions from Loryma and Vicinity". American Journal of Archaeology. 34 (4): 451–460. doi:10.2307/289383. JSTOR 289383.
- — (1914). "A Sculptured Basis from Loryma". American Journal of Archaeology. 18 (3): 285–296. doi:10.2307/497222. JSTOR 497222.
- — (1920). "Review: The Platonism of Philo Judaeus by Thomas H. Billings". The Classical Weekly. 13 (16): 160. doi:10.2307/4387947. JSTOR 4387947.
- — (1922). "Sixth Preliminary Report on the American Excavations at Sardes in Asia Minor". American Journal of Archaeology. 26 (4): 389–409. doi:10.2307/497951. JSTOR 497951.
- — (1924). "A Marble Copy of Athena Parthenos in Princeton". American Journal of Archaeology. 28 (2): 117–119. doi:10.2307/497731. JSTOR 497731.
- — (1926). Terra-cottas: Part I: Architectural Terra-cottas. Sardis. Vol. 10. Cambridge University Press. OCLC 1000688644.
- — (1927). "Review: Iconographie de l'Iphigénie en Tauride d'Euripide, H. Phillippart". American Journal of Archaeology. 31 (4): 527–528. doi:10.2307/497882. JSTOR 497882.
- — (1927). "Review: The Aegean Civilization by Gustave Glotz". The Classical Weekly. 20 (25): 201–202. doi:10.2307/4388997. JSTOR 4388997.
- — (1928). "Excavations in the Theatre District and Tombs of Corinth in 1928". American Journal of Archaeology. 32 (4): 474–495. doi:10.2307/497779. JSTOR 497779.
- — (1928). "Review: Alcamenes and the Establishment of the Classical Type in Greek Art by Charles Walston". American Journal of Archaeology. 32 (1): 124–125. doi:10.2307/497593. JSTOR 497593.
- — (1928). "Review: Die Griechischen Terrakotten by August Köster". American Journal of Archaeology. 32 (1): 125–126. doi:10.2307/497594. JSTOR 497594.
- — (1930). The Roman Villa. Corinth. Vol. 5. London, Oxford and Leipzig: American School of Classical Studies at Athens. JSTOR i403360.
- — (1931). "The Excavation of Roman Chamber Tombs at Corinth in 1931". American Journal of Archaeology. 35 (4): 424–441. doi:10.2307/498100. JSTOR 498100.
- — (1933a). "The Progress of the First Campaign of Excavation in 1931". Hesperia. 2 (2): 96–109. doi:10.2307/146504. JSTOR 146504.
- — (1933b). "The Campaign of 1932". Hesperia. 2 (4): 451–474. doi:10.2307/146653. JSTOR 146653.
- — (1933c). "The Sculpture". Hesperia. 2 (4): 514–541. doi:10.2307/146656. JSTOR 146656.
- — (December 1, 1933). "How an Archeologist Works". Scientific American. Vol. 149, no. 6. p. 261. doi:10.1038/scientificamerican1233-261.
- — (1933e). "The Current Excavations in the Athenian Agora". American Journal of Archaeology. 37 (2): 305–312. doi:10.2307/498448. JSTOR 498448.
- — (1933f). "The Latter Part of the Agora Campaign of 1933". American Journal of Archaeology. 37 (4): 540–548. doi:10.2307/498118. JSTOR 498118.
- — (1935). "The Excavations in the Athenian Agora". American Journal of Archaeology. 39 (2): 173–181. doi:10.2307/498330. JSTOR 498330.
- — (1935). "The Agora Excavations". American Journal of Archaeology. 39 (4): 437–444. doi:10.2307/498148. JSTOR 498148.
- — (1935). "The Campaign of 1933". Hesperia. 4 (3): 311–339. doi:10.2307/146456. JSTOR 146456.
- — (1935). "The Campaign of 1934". Hesperia. 4 (3): 340–370. doi:10.2307/146457. JSTOR 146457.
- — (1935). "The Sculpture Found in 1933". Hesperia. 4 (3): 371–420. doi:10.2307/146458. JSTOR 146458.
- — (1936). "The Current Excavations in the Athenian Agora". American Journal of Archaeology. 40 (2): 188–203. doi:10.2307/498475. JSTOR 498475.
- — (1936). "The Conclusion of the 1936 Campaign in the Athenian Agora". American Journal of Archaeology. 40 (4): 403–414. doi:10.2307/498793. JSTOR 498793.
- — (1936). "The Campaign of 1935". Hesperia. 5 (1): 1–42. doi:10.2307/146551. JSTOR 146551.
- — (1937). "Excavations in the Athenian Agora". American Journal of Archaeology. 41 (2): 177–189. doi:10.2307/498408. JSTOR 498408.
- — (1937). "The Campaign of 1936". Hesperia. 6 (3): 333–381. doi:10.2307/146646. JSTOR 146646.
- — (1938). "Latter Part of the 1937 Campaign in the Athenian Agora". American Journal of Archaeology. 42 (1): 1–16. doi:10.2307/498824. JSTOR 498824.
- — (1938). "The Campaign of 1937". Hesperia. 7 (3): 311–362. JSTOR 146578.
- — (February 1, 1939). "American Archaeologists in Ancient Athens". Scientific American. Vol. 160, no. 2. p. 90. doi:10.1038/scientificamerican0239-90. JSTOR 24955537.
- — (1939). "Discoveries in the Agora in 1939". American Journal of Archaeology. 43 (4): 577–588. doi:10.2307/498983. JSTOR 498983.
- — (August 1, 1939). "Excavations in Ancient Athens". Scientific American. Vol. 151, no. 4. p. 181. doi:10.1038/scientificamerican1034-181.
- — (1939). "The Campaign of 1938". Hesperia. 8 (3): 201–246. doi:10.2307/146675. JSTOR 146675.
- — (1940). "The Campaign of 1939". Hesperia. 9 (3): 261–308. doi:10.2307/146481. JSTOR 146481.
- — (1941). "The Campaign of 1940". Hesperia. 10 (1): 1–8. doi:10.2307/146598. JSTOR 146598.
- — (1944). "Lodge and Knapp: The First Editors". The Classical Weekly. 37 (24): 236–237. JSTOR 4341952.

== Works cited ==
- Allen, Susan Heuck (2011). Classical Spies: American Archaeologists with the OSS in World War II Greece. Ann Arbor: University of Michigan Press. ISBN 978-0-472-03539-7.
- Blegen, Carl W. (April 5, 1922), Report on Excavations at Zygouries, Hagiorgitika and Hymettus (PDF), Athens – via American School of Classical Studies at Athens
- Commemorative Studies in Honor of Theodore Leslie Shear (PDF). Hesperia Supplements. Vol. 8. Princeton: American School of Classical Studies at Athens. 1949. ISBN 978-0-87661-508-9.
- Cook, John Manuel (1950). "Review: Commemorative Studies in Honor of Theodore Leslie Shear (Hesperia, Supplement VIII)". The Journal of Hellenic Studies. 70: 89–90. doi:10.2307/629320. JSTOR 629320.
- de Grummond, Nancy (1996). "Shear, T. Leslie (1880–1945)". In de Grummond, Nancy (ed.). An Encyclopaedia of the History of Classical Archaeology. Abingdon: Routledge. pp. 1026–1027. ISBN 1-884964 80 X.
- "Dr. William McDowell Halsey '71". The Princeton Alumni Weekly. 17 (1): 28. October 4, 1916.
- Dumont, Sylvie (2020). Vrysaki: A Neighborhood Lost in Search of the Athenian Agora. Princeton: American School of Classical Studies at Athens. ISBN 978-0-87661-969-8.
- Dyson, Stephen (2016). Ancient Marbles to American Shores: Classical Archaeology in the United States. Philadelphia: University of Pennsylvania Press. ISBN 978-1-5128-0197-2.
- Hamilakis, Yannis (2013). "Double Colonization: The Story of the Excavations of the Athenian Agora (1924–1931)". Hesperia. 82 (1): 153–177. doi:10.2972/hesperia.82.1.0153. JSTOR 10.2972/hesperia.82.1.0153.
- Hill, Bert Hodge (1926), Forty-Fifth Annual Report of the Managing Committee of the American School of Classical Studies at Athens (PDF) – via American School of Classical Studies at Athens
- Hoff, Michael (1996). "American School of Classical Studies at Athens". In de Grummond, Nancy (ed.). An Encyclopaedia of the History of Classical Archaeology. Abingdon: Routledge. pp. 44–45. ISBN 1-884964 80 X.
- Hood, Rachel (1998). Faces of Archaeology in Greece: Caricatures by Piet de Jong. Oxford: Leopard's Head. ISBN 0-904920-38-0.
- Hoskins Walbank, Mary E.; Walbank, Michael B. (2015). "A Roman Corinthian Family Tomb and Its Afterlife". Hesperia. 84 (1): 149–206. doi:10.2972/hesperia.84.1.0149. JSTOR 10.2972/hesperia.84.1.0149.
- Lord, Louis E. (1947). A History of the American School of Classical Studies at Athens 1882–1942 (PDF). Cambridge: Harvard University Press. OCLC 648555.
- Luke, Christina (2019). A Pearl in Peril: Heritage and Diplomacy in Turkey. Oxford University Press. ISBN 978-0-19-049887-0.
- Kourelis, Kostis (2007). "Byzantium and the Avant-Garde: Excavations at Corinth, 1920s–1930s". Hesperia. 76 (2): 391–442. doi:10.2972/hesp.76.2.391. ISSN 0018-098X. JSTOR 25068026. S2CID 162303616.
- Mauzy, Craig (2006). Agora Excavations 1931–2006: A Pictorial History. Princeton: American School of Classical Studies at Athens. ISBN 978-0-87661-910-0.
- Meritt, Lucy Shoe (1984). History of the American School of Classical Studies at Athens 1939–1980. Princeton: American School of Classical Studies at Athens. ISBN 0-87661-942-1.
- Misener, Geneva (1909). "Review: The Influence of Plato upon Saint Basil by Theodore Leslie Shear". The Classical Review. 4 (5): 238. JSTOR 3287430.
- "Proceedings of the Forty-Third Annual Meeting of the American Philological Association Held at Pittsburgh, Pennsylvania, December, 1911 Also of the Thirteenth Annual Meeting of the Philological Association of the Pacific Coast Held at San Francisco, California November, 1911". Transactions and Proceedings of the American Philological Association. 42: i–iii, v–cxvii. 1911. doi:10.2307/282581. JSTOR 282581.
- Sanders, Guy D. R.; Palinkas, Jennifer; Tzonou-Herbst, Ioulia (2018). Ancient Corinth: Side Guide (7th ed.). Princeton: American School of Classical Studies at Athens. ISBN 978-0-87661-661-1.
- Smith, Peter C. (2008). War in the Aegean: The Campaign for the Eastern Mediterranean in World War II. Mechanicsburg: Stackpole Books. ISBN 978-0-8117-4637-3.
- Stillwell, Richard (1945). "Necrology: Theodore Leslie Shear". American Journal of Archaeology. 49 (4): 582–583. JSTOR 499873.
- Thompson, Homer A. (1945). "Theodore Leslie Shear". Bulletin of the Archaeological Institute of America. 36 (Annual Reports, Minutes of the Council Directory): 42–46. ISSN 2831-9559.
- Williams, Charles Kaufmann, II (2003). "Preface". Corinth: The Centenary: 1896–1996. Princeton: American School of Classical Studies at Athens. pp. vii–ix. ISBN 0-87661-020-3.
- Vogeikoff-Brogan, Natalia (February 7, 2021). "Where There's Smoke There's Fire: De Waele's Story". From the Archivist's Notebook. Archived from the original on February 8, 2023.
- Whitling, Frederick (2019). Western Ways: Foreign Schools in Rome and Athens. Boston: De Gruyter. ISBN 978-3-11-060158-9.
