= John Franklin Daniel III =

American archaeologist (1910–1948)

- Born: June 8, 1910; Ann Arbor, Michigan
- Died: December 17, 1948; Gordion, Turkey
- Title: Professor of Classical Archaeology
- Spouse: Ellen Alix DuPoy Taylor

Academic background
- Education: University of Pennsylvania

John Franklin Daniel III (born Ann Arbor, Michigan June 8, 1910; died Gordion, Turkey December 17, 1948) was an American archaeologist, known for his work on deciphering the Cypro-Minoan script.

== Career ==
Daniel was involved in the archaeological excavations at Kourion from 1934 to 1939, and also took part in the excavations at Tarsus led by Hetty Goldman. His studies led him to travel extensively in Germany, France, Greece and Turkey.

Daniel began working at the University of Pennsylvania in 1940 and obtained his PhD in Greek at the university in 1941. During these years he engaged in excavations for the university on the island of Cyprus.

=== Espionage during WWII ===
Daniel left the university in 1942 to join the Greek desk of the Office of Strategic Services, an intelligence agency that was a predecessor to the CIA. The agency used archaeology as a cover to conduct espionage and assist the war effort. Daniel's background in linguistics made him a natural cryptographer, and he was already familiar with the strategically important island of Cyprus. Daniel helped to establish the Greek Desk with its founder, Rodney Young, and James H. Oliver. He eventually ran the OSS base in Cyprus, an important hub for the flow of intelligence in the Mediterranean Theater of Operations.

=== Post-war archaeological career ===
The young Daniel rapidly ascended as a prominent authority in Mediterranean archaeology. He was appointed as curator of the Mediterranean section of the University of Pennsylvania Museum of Archaeology and Anthropology in 1946, and became chief editor of the American Journal of Archaeology in 1947. The following year, he was appointed as Professor of Classical Archaeology at University of Pennsylvania.

Daniel met Alice Kober in 1941 at the Archaeological Institute of America, while delivering a presentation on the Bronze Age Kourion. The two became lifelong friends, and collaborated on studying the Cypro-Minoan syllabary. Daniel's work in this area helped to establish new methodologies for decryption of ancient languages.

== Death and legacy ==
On December 17, 1948 Daniel set out with Rodney Young to scout a new archaeological site in Turkey, now known as Gordion. While scouting the site in a jeep with Young, Daniel became suddenly ill, and was pronounced dead at a hospital in Antalya. His death has been suggested as a possible heart attack or aneurysm. Daniel's assistant, the archaeologist Ellen Kohler believed that foul play was involved in his death. Sara Anderson Immerwahr, a colleague and friend of Daniel, later stated that she believed he had been poisoned as a consequence of his espionage activities.

His death came as a surprise to the Museum of Archaeology and Anthropology, and he was memorialized in an obituary in the American Journal of Archaeology. Rodney Young subsequently took up Daniel's work at Gordion and Cyprus. After his death, Daniel's work became obscure again until the 1980s, when it was reassessed and praised by contemporary archaeologists.

== Selected publications ==
- Prolegomena to the Cypro-Minoan Script

== See also ==
- Rodney Young
- Dorothy Cox
