= Burial vault (tomb) =

Underground container for burial

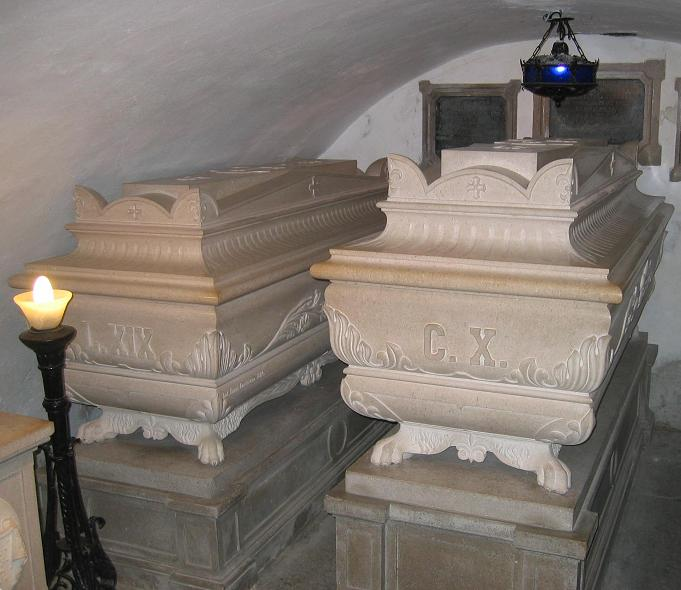
Tomb of the French King Charles X, and his son Louis, in the Franciscan monastery Kostanjevici, Nova Gorica, Slovenia.

A burial vault is a structural stone or brick-lined underground tomb or 'burial chamber' for the interment of a single body or multiple bodies underground. The main difference between entombment in a subterranean vault and a traditional in-ground burial is that the coffin is not placed directly in the earth, but is placed in a burial chamber specially built for this purpose. A burial vault refers to an underground chamber, in contrast to an above-ground, freestanding mausoleum. These underground burial tombs were originally and are still often vaulted and usually have stone slab entrances. They are often privately owned and used for specific family or other groups, but usually stand beneath a public religious building, such as a church, or in a churchyard or cemetery. A crypt may be used as a burial vault and a freestanding mausoleum may contain a burial vault beneath the ground.

== History and description ==
After the Christianization of Europe, in most areas ruled by the Holy Roman Empire, vault entombments initially mostly took place inside church crypts under the influence of Catholic Church. Since the Middle Ages, this form of burial was essentially reserved for the privileged members of society, including monarchs, high-ranking clergy, nobility and other notable individuals. Ornately carved and elaborately designed sarcophagi were often used for the dead from higher social classes which took place in church and cathedral crypts beneath the floor. In this sense, a crypt entombment inside a vault enabled the “intact storage” of the body of the deceased until the Last Judgment.

The last resting places of European monarchs were mostly designed as vaults. Commoners were usually buried in the ground, sometimes in mass graves. Due to pestilences such as plague outbreaks along with population growth and increasing mortality rates, some precautionary measures had to be taken against intramural burials and entombments in the vaults beneath places of public worship which was deemed to be unsanitary. At the end of the 18th century, a gradual change took place in the continental Europe as a result of the Enlightenment and modern ideas about hygiene, stemming from the miasma theory. In-ground burials outside the walls or boundaries of cities started to replace crypt entombments in the vaults. In 1784, under Emperor Joseph II, a ban on burials inside churches was introduced, with the exception of bishops who were permitted to be entombed in the church crypts. And a similar decree was promulgated by Napoleon in 1804, under the Edict of Saint-Cloud. Instead, the tombs were moved to the cemeteries and became the subject of regulation by cemetery management and civil authorities. This decision led to construction of private burial vaults in cemeteries and on private property, both by Catholics and Protestants alike.

Although ecclesiastical burial of the Catholic high-ranking clergy within the church vaults was always a norm from the beginning, the vault entombment has proved to be very popular among the Protestant nobility and gentry of Nordic countries, along with predominantly Protestant areas of Germany. The popularity of vault entombment as a burial method among Protestant laity of upper classes might be explained by Martin Luther's view on the 'State of the Dead' and the Resurrection of the Dead which is attributed to his translation and interpretation of the Biblical verses in Job 19: 25–27 regarding bodily resurrection in flesh; therefore the burial practises of Lutheran-dominated regions were heavily influenced by the notion of a 'well-preserved corpse' in dry, vented vaults. Aside from the religious concerns, the economic and political rise of the bourgeoisie at the beginning of the 19th century and the associated desire for representation contributed to the fact that burial chambers and mausoleums as status symbol, continued to be built as a monumental form of artistic value.

In most cemeteries, the planning and construction of an underground crypt as well as a freestanding mausoleum was subjected to approval and it was possible after examining the submitted construction drawings, and access via stairs was usually permitted if the grave vault was of sufficient size. Although it always had to be enclosed, the relatives were still able to get close to the coffin to pray and pay their respects. Over the course of the 19th century, the free placement of coffins in the crypt vaults was increasingly prohibited, and the coffins had to be sealed in wall niches or locked chambers within the actual crypt, and coffins had to be constructed of metal, or zinc-lined wooden coffins and sealed stone sarcophagi to be used, in order to prevent the bodily effluvia and unhealthy vapors of decomposition from escaping.

In addition to private burial vaults, many cemeteries had built public receiving vaults for the temporary storage of corpses for a fee that were only to be interred at a later date.

== Gallery ==
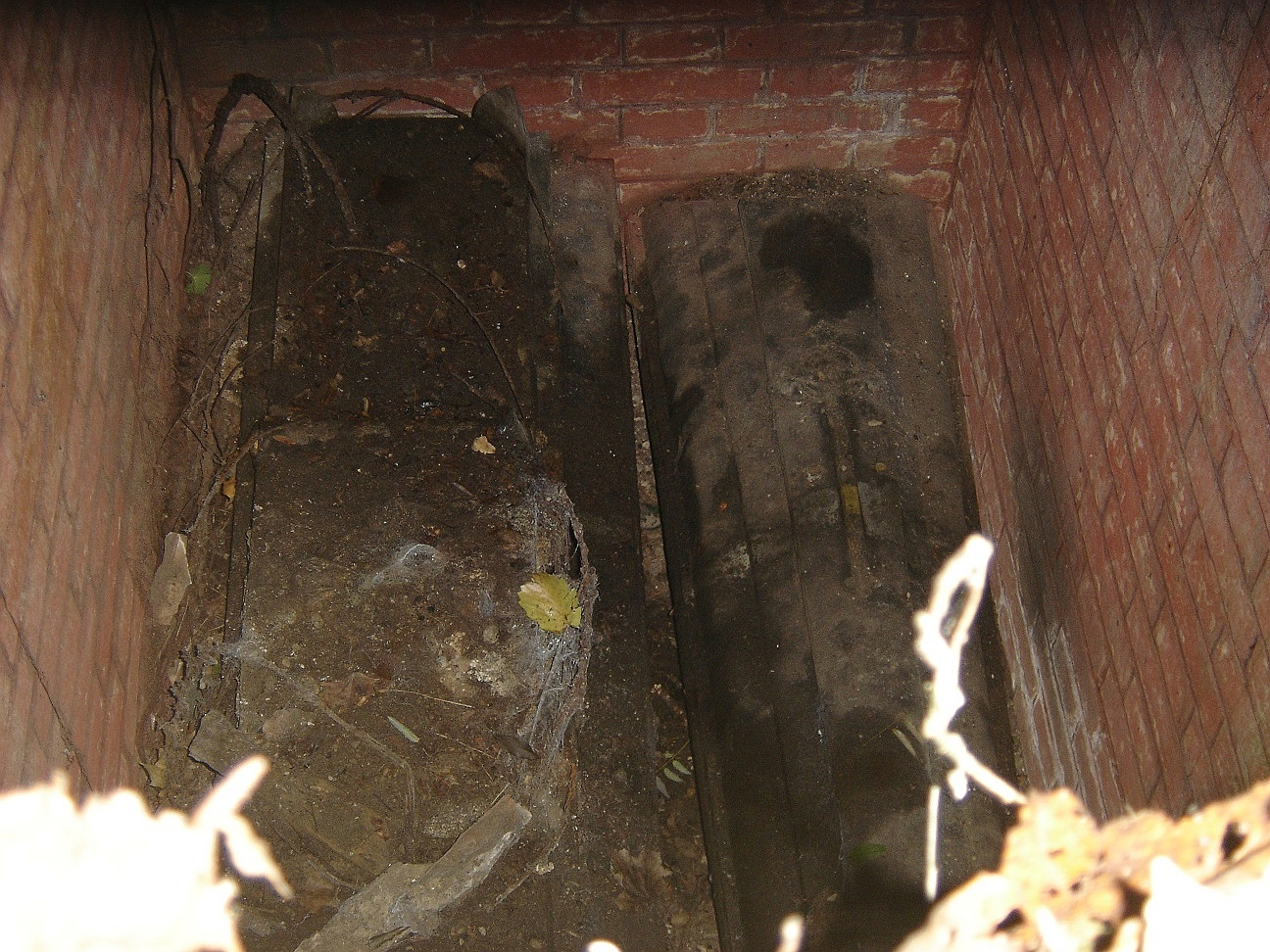
A brick-lined burial vault containing two sealed zinc coffins in Vienna Central Cemetery.

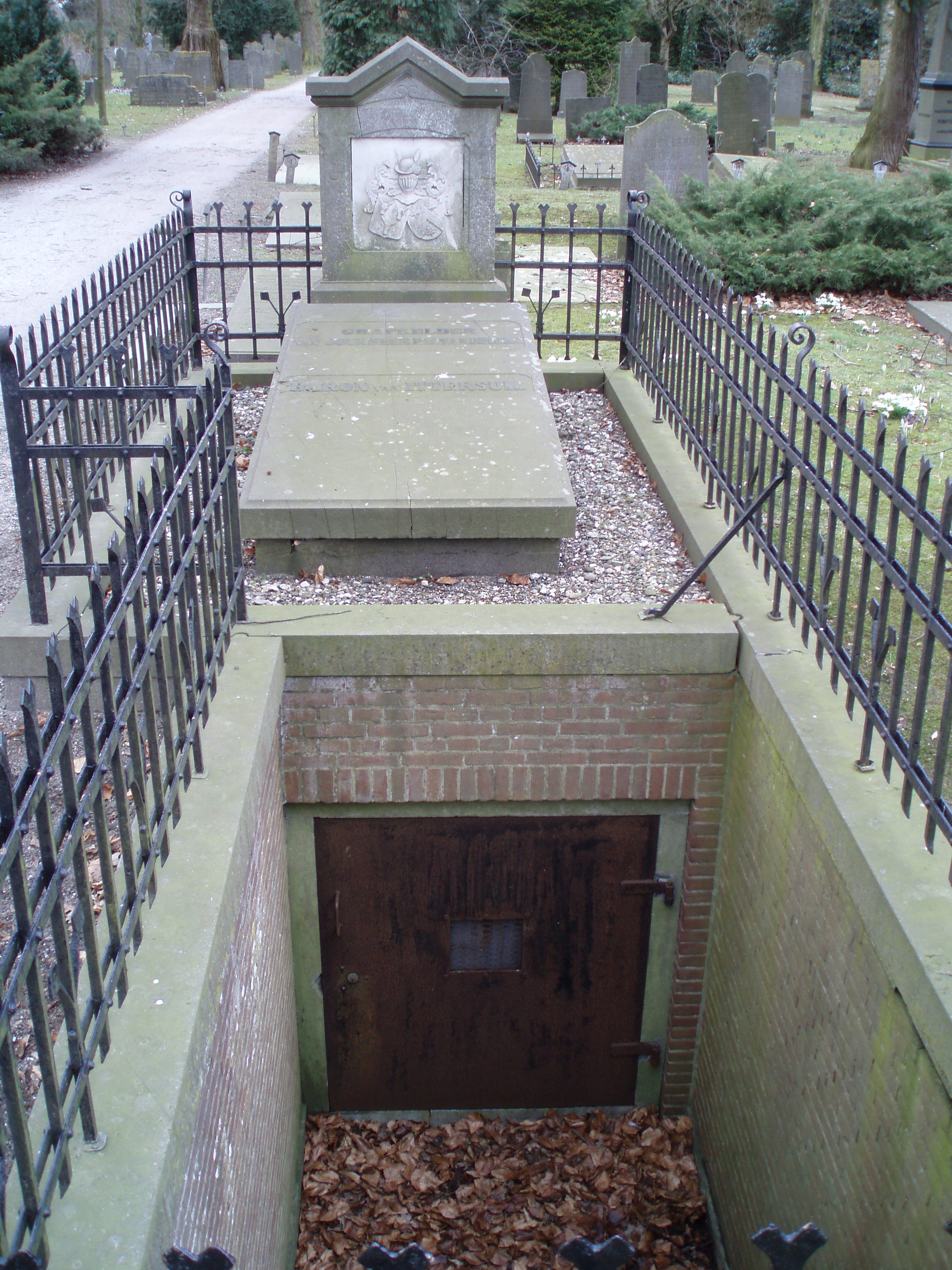
Subterranean burial vault of Baron van Ittersum in Zwolle, Netherlands.

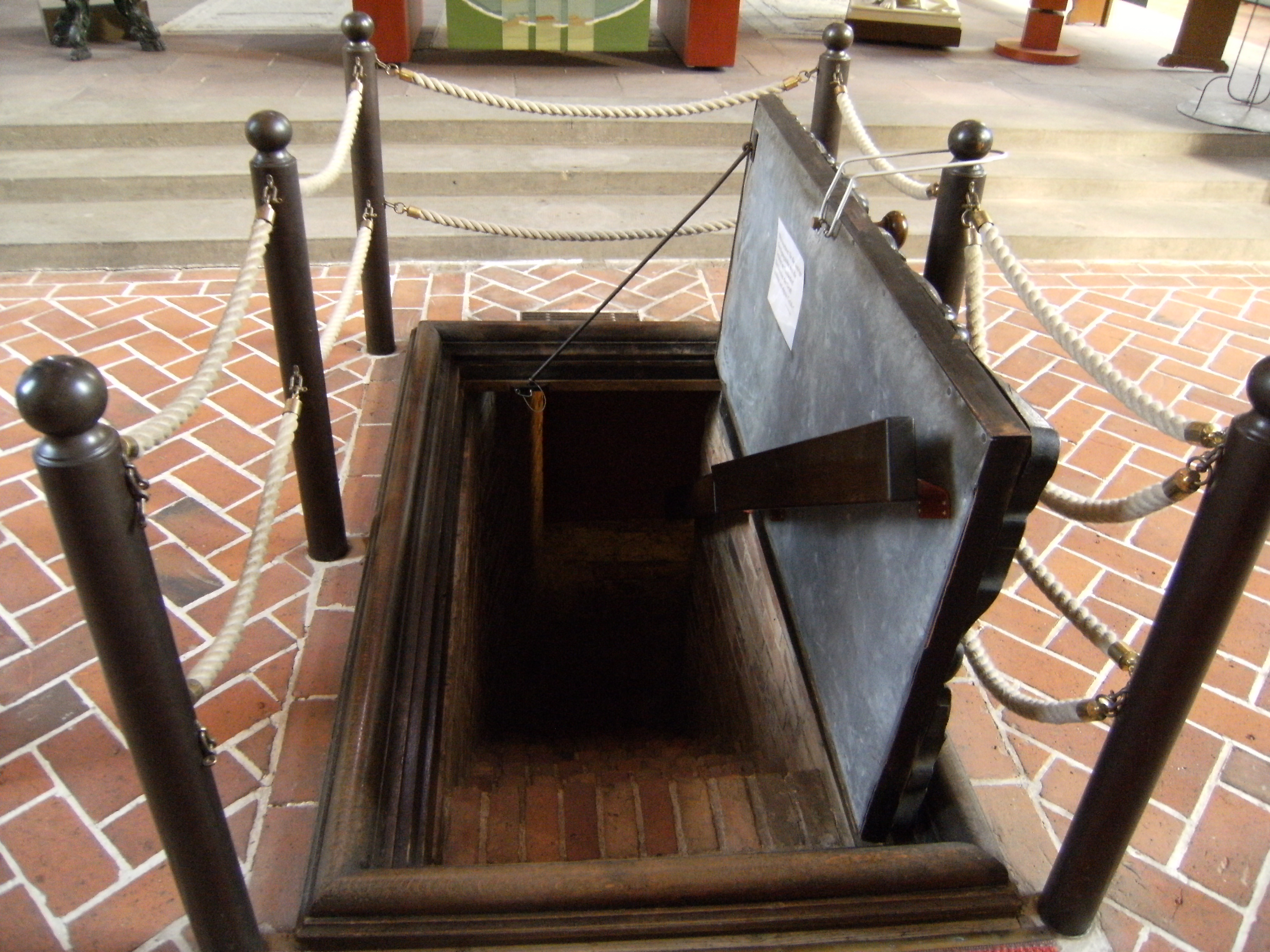
Entrance to the ducal burial vault in the Church of St. Petri in Wolgast, Germany.

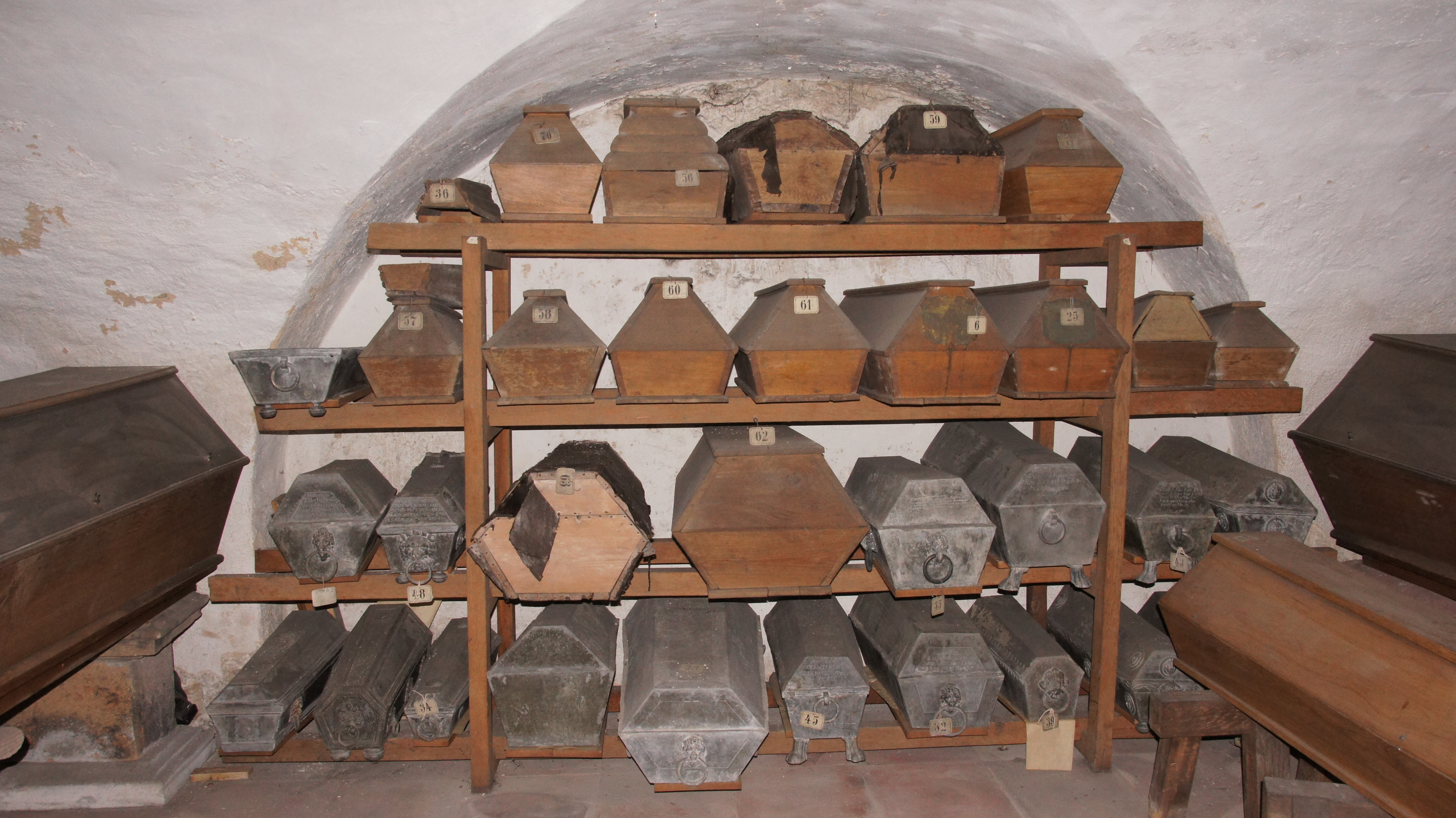
A row of children coffins in the burial vault of Bad Homburg Castle, Germany.

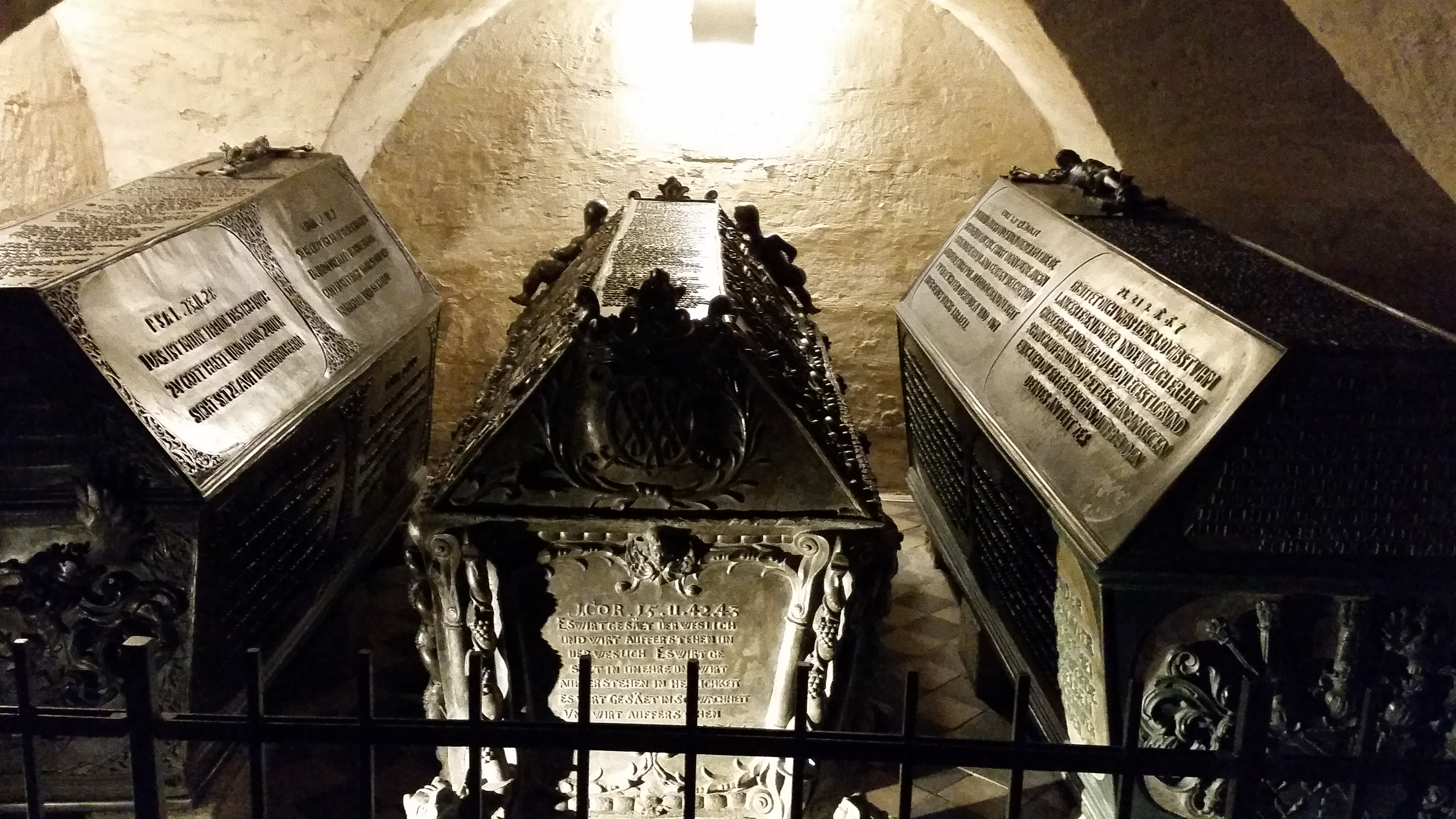
Elaborate zinc coffins in the ducal burial vault of St. Mary's Lutheran Church in Wolfenbüttel, Germany.

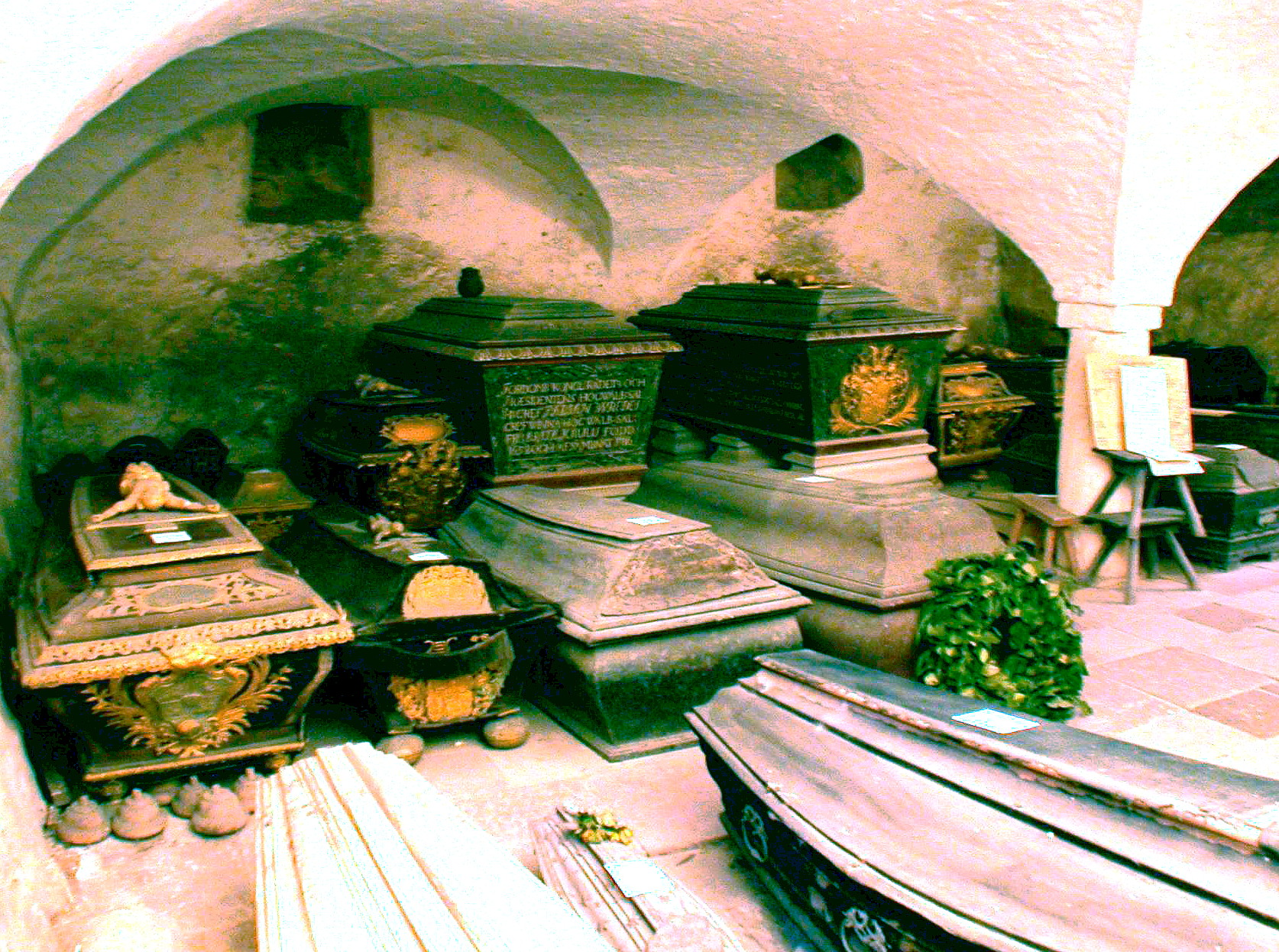
Coffins in the vault beneath Björklinge Parish Church in Uppsala, Sweden.

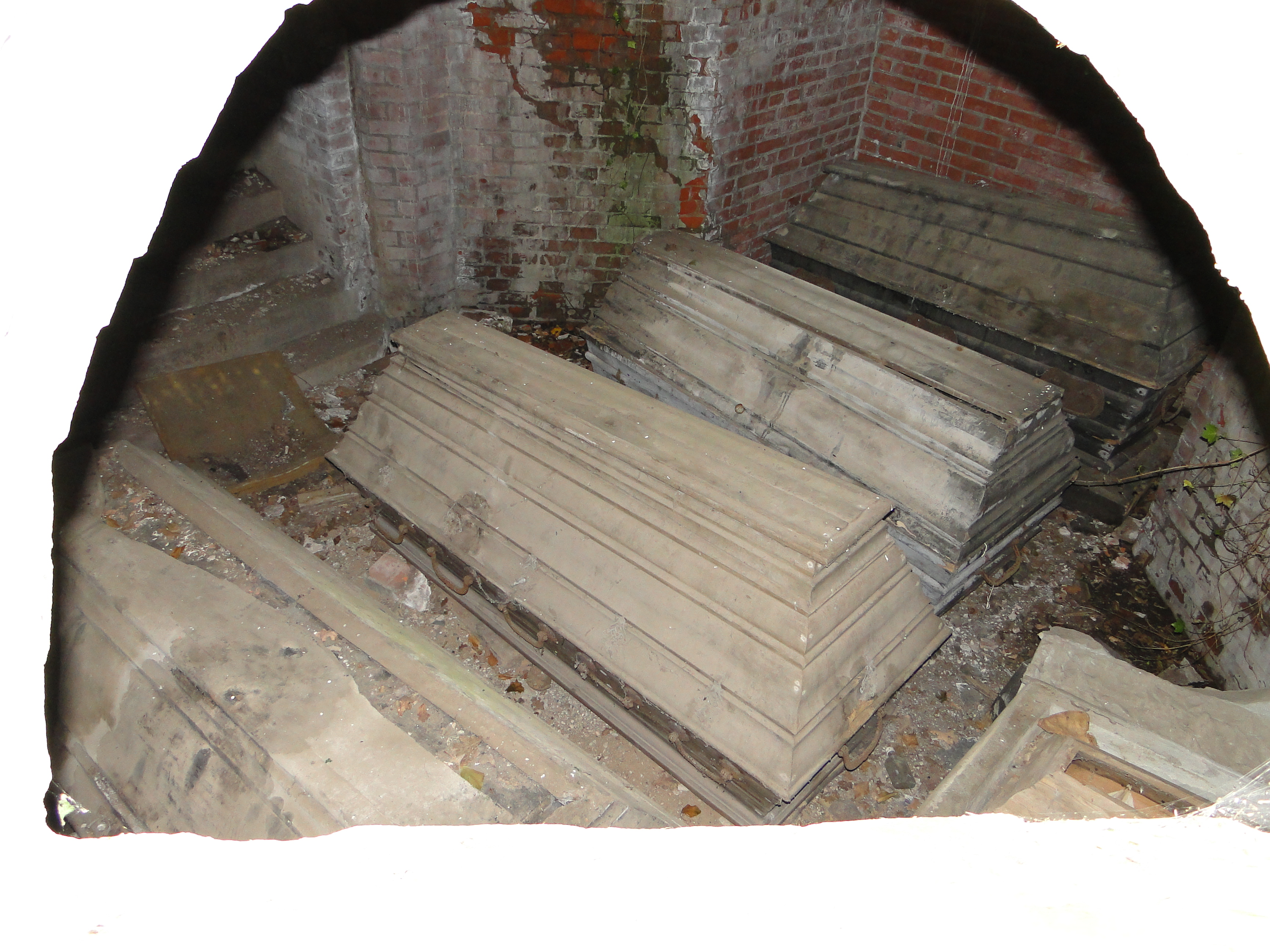
Coffins resting at the burial vault of Barner family on the churchyard of Bülow in Germany.

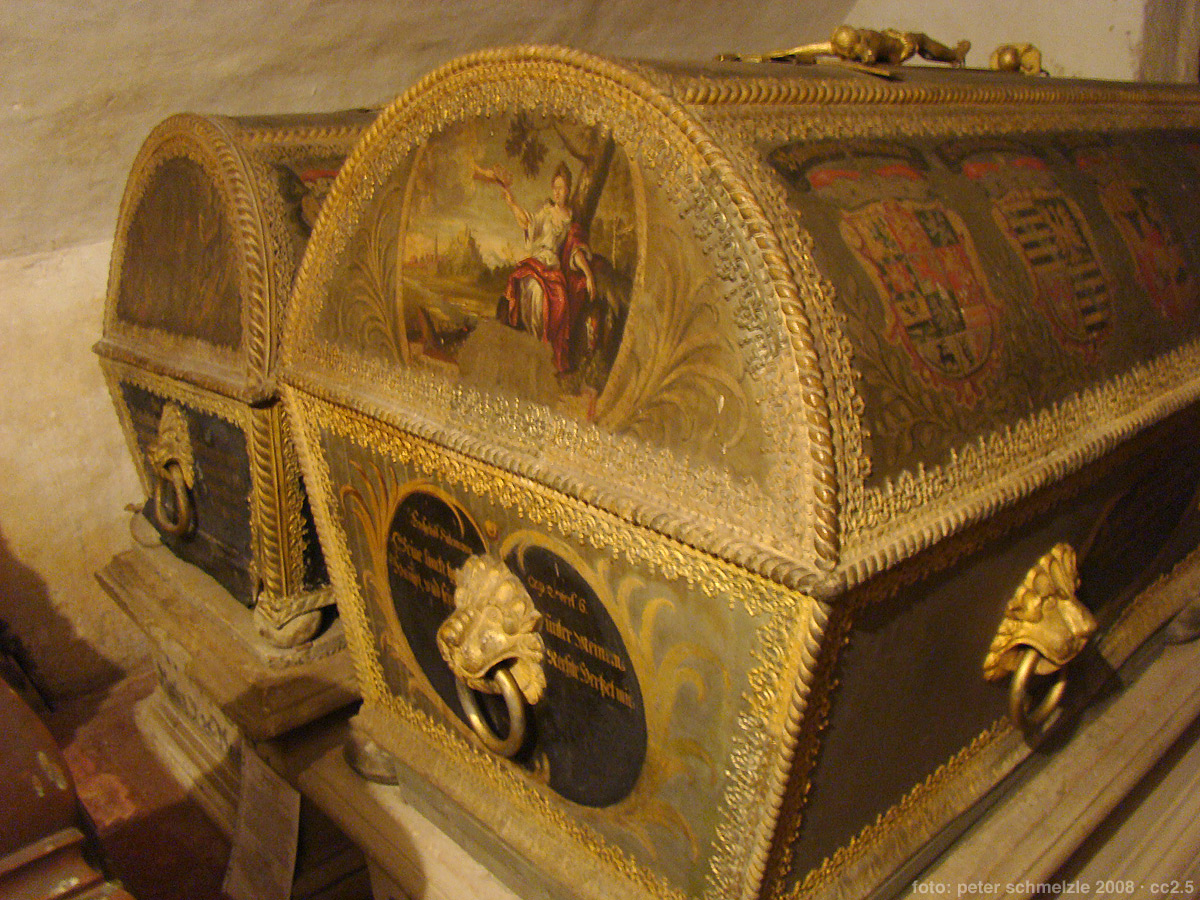
Ornately decorated coffins of Duke Frederick, Duke of Württemberg-Neuenstadt and his wife Duchess Clara Augusta of Braunschweig-Wolfenbüttel in the burial vault of St. Nicholas Church in Neuenstadt am Kocher, Germany.

== See also ==
- Columbarium
- Crypt
- Mausoleum
