= Machteld Mellink =

Dutch-American archaeologist of Near Eastern cultures (1917–2006)

- Born: 26 October 1917; Amsterdam, North Holland, The Netherlands
- Died: 23 February 2006 (aged 88); Haverford, Pennsylvania, United States
- Education: Utrecht University (PhD)

Machteld Johanna Mellink (October 26, 1917 – February 23, 2006) was an archaeologist who studied Near Eastern cultures and history.

== Biography ==
Mellink received her undergraduate training at the University of Amsterdam and her doctorate from Utrecht University in 1943. Mellink moved to Bryn Mawr College in 1946 as an American Association of University Women Marion Reilly Fellow and spent the summer of 1947 at the University of Chicago on a Ryerson Grant. During this time, she began excavating with Hetty Goldman at Tarsus, in southern Turkey. She began teaching in Bryn Mawr College's Department of Classical and Near Eastern Archaeology in 1949 and retired in 1988; in 1972, she was appointed to the Leslie Clark Chair in the Humanities. The same year she was elected a Fellow of the American Academy of Arts and Sciences. From 1950 until 1965, she was involved in the excavations at Gordium, Turkey, together with Rodney Young of the University of Pennsylvania. Mellink's most well-known work focused on the site of Karataş-Semayük in the Elmali plain in Lycia where she explored Early Bronze Age remains and tombs.

Mellink was professor emerita of Classical and Near Eastern Archaeology at Bryn Mawr College. In 1994, she received the Lucy Wharton Drexel Medal for achievement in archaeology from the University of Pennsylvania Museum. She received the Archaeological Institute of America's Gold Medal for Distinguished Archaeological Achievement in 1991. The Ministry of Culture of Turkey recognized her as the Senior American Excavator in 1984 and the Senior Foreign Archaeologist in 1985. In 2001, the Archaeological Institute of America established in her honor the Machteld Mellink Lecture in Near Eastern Archaeology. Bryn Mawr College awarded her the Lindback Foundation Award for Distinguished Teaching in 1975.

Among the scholars she mentored was the archaeologist Theresa Carter, who wrote her PhD dissertation on Kassite history and archaeology under Mellink's supervision.

She was a Member of the American Philosophical Society, a Research Associate of the University of Pennsylvania Museum, and a Corresponding Member of the Turkish Institute of History, the Royal Netherlands Academy of Arts and Sciences since 1961, the German Archaeological Institute, and the Austrian Archaeological Institute, and many other international archaeological societies.

Her professional service included being President of the American Research Institute in Turkey from 1988 to 1991, President of the Archaeological Institute of America from 1980 to 1984, Trustee of the American Society of Oriental Research, Chair of the Department of Classical and Near Eastern Archaeology at Bryn Mawr College from 1955 to 1983, and Acting Dean of the Graduate School of Arts and Sciences at Bryn Mawr College from 1979 to 1980.

== Bibliography ==
Mellink's bibliography is published in

- Canby, Jeanny Vorys; Porada, Edith; Sismondo Ridgway, Brunilde; Stech, Tamara, eds. (1986). Ancient Anatolia: aspects of change and cultural development. Essays in honor of Machteld J. Mellink. Madison, WI: University of Wisconsin Press. ISBN 0-299-10620-9.

Some of Mellink's publications are:

- Troy and the Trojan War (1986)
- A Hittite cemetery at Gordion (1956)

== Obituaries ==
- "Machteld Mellink, Pioneer of Turkish Archaeology and Defender of Cultural Heritage, Dies at 88". Bryn Mawr College. 2006-03-02. Archived from the original on 20 October 2013.
- "Machteld Johanna Mellink". Bryn Mawr College, Department of Classical and Near Eastern Archaeology. Archived from the original on 2016-03-04 – via WayBack Machine.
- "Professor Machteld Mellink". The Times. 2006-03-22. ISSN 0140-0460.
- Greenwalt Jr., Crawford H. (July 2007). "Machteld Johanna Mellink, 1917-2006". American Journal of Archaeology. 111 (3): 553–558. JSTOR 40027084.
- Pearce, Jeremy (March 6, 2006). "Machteld J. Mellink, 88, Archaeologist, Dies". The New York Times.
- Yntema, D.G. "Machteld Johanna Mellink. 26 oktober 1917 – 23 februari 2006" (pdf). Digitaal Wetenschapshistorisch Centrum. Levensberichten en herdenkingen van de KNAW (in Dutch). pp. 54–58.
