= A History of Babylonia and Assyria =

1900 non-fiction work by Robert William Rogers

- Author: Robert William Rogers
- Language: English
- Genre: Non-fiction
- Publisher: Eaton & Mains
- Publication date: 1900 or 1901
- Publication place: United States

A History of Babylonia and Assyria is a two volume non-fiction work written by Robert William Rogers and originally published in 1900 or 1901 by Eaton & Mains of New York City. It went through successive rewrites that updated the work and the sixth edition was published in 1915 by Abingdon Press.

== Overview ==
The two volumes are parceled into four books:

Book 1: " Prolegomena, or Discoveries and Decipherments, Sources, Lands, Peoples, and Chronology of Babylonian History;"
Book 2: "History of Babylonia;"
Book 3: "History of Assyria;"
Book 4: "History of the Chaldean Empire."

By 1915 a "largely rewritten" sixth edition was published.

== About the author ==
Robert William Rogers (Ph.D., DD., LLD.) was a fellow of the Royal Geographical Society. When he wrote this two volume work, he was a professor in Drew Theological Seminary in Madison, New Jersey. He published several works including, The Religion of Babylonia and Assyria, Especially in Its Relations with Israel. A lecture series by him was also published in 1931.

== See also ==
- Ancient Mesopotamia at the Dawn of Civilization an ancient history monograph by Guillermo Algaze.
