= Karataş-Semayük =

Archaeological site in Turkey

- Location within Turkey
- 36°45′0″N 29°58′0″E
- Type: settlement
- Periods: Bronze Age
- Location: Antalya Province, (Turkey)

History
- Built: 3th millennium BC

Site notes
- Excavation dates: 1963-1974
- Archaeologists: Machteld J Mellink
- Condition: Ruined
- Owner: Public
- Public access: Yes

Karataş-Semayük (also Elmali-Karataş) is an ancient Near East archaeological site in Antalya Province, Turkey. The village of Semayiik (now Bozüyük) is nearby. The modern town of Elmali lies about 10 kilometers to the west and the modern city of Burdur about 170 kilometers to the north. It consists of a large, about 2.2 hectare, Early Bronze Age cemetery with a small associated settlement of the same period. The settlement consisted of a large, well built palisaded mudbrick building on a slight central mound with the rest of the residences on an adjacent lower terrace. The closest analog to the cemetery in Anatolia is that of Yortan (type site for the Yortan culture. The Late Chalcolithic site of Bağbaşi, about 700 meters to the west of Karataş-Semayük, was also examined as well as the nearby sites of Karaburun and Boztepe. Six excavation reports were planned but it appears that only three were released. While working at this site the excavation team did rescue archaeology at the sites of Kizilbel and Karaburun that were being looted, excavating two painted tomb chambers.

== Archaeology ==
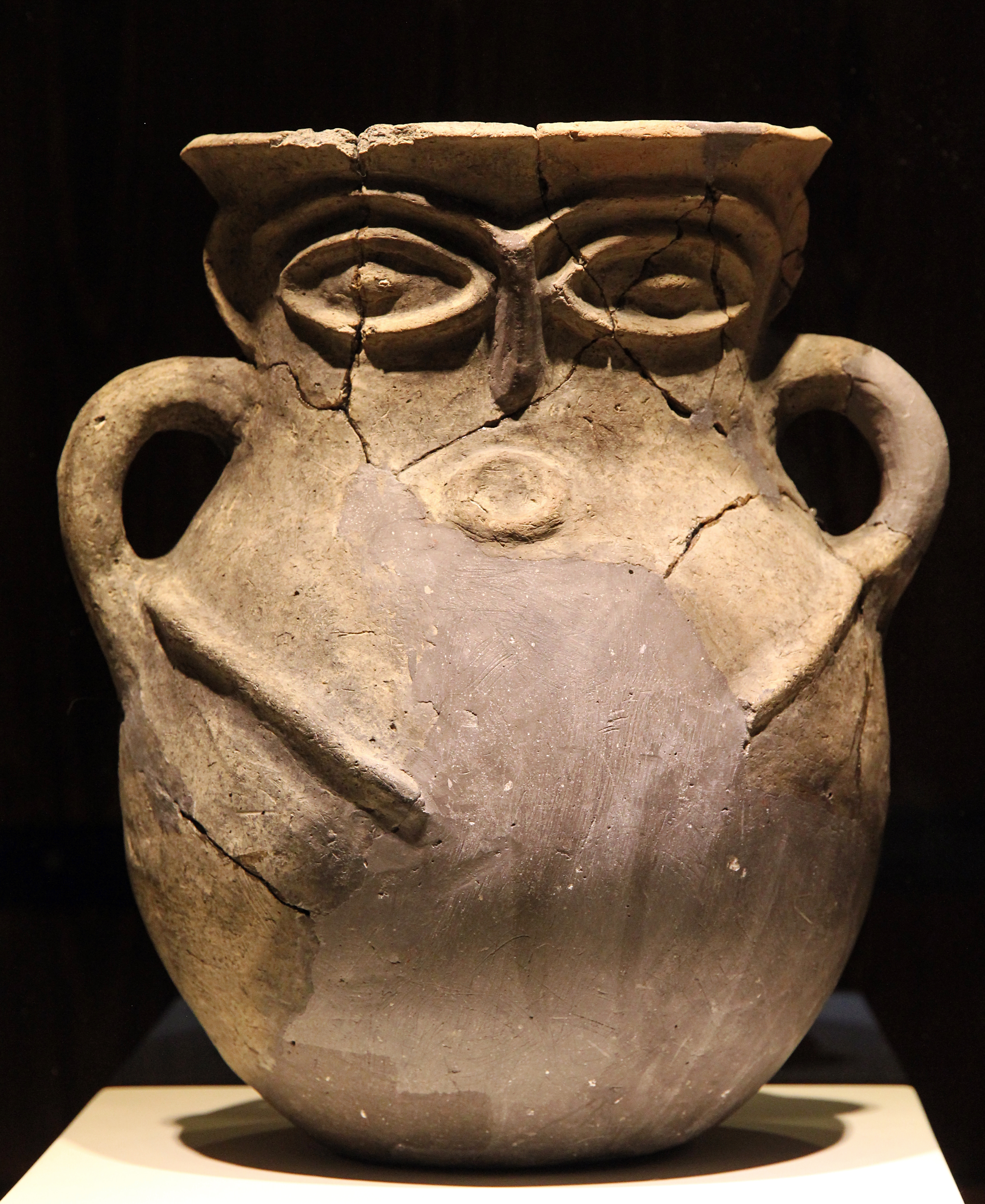
Ceremonial Vessel in the shape of a human. From Karataş Semahöyük, mid 3rd millennium BC

The site was first noticed in 1962. Work by a Bryn Mawr College team led by Machteld J Mellink began in 1963 with the excavation of a 35 meter by 45 meter area of the cemetery. All burials were of pithos type either in large pithos or in large flat based loop-handled jars, inclined facing east and covered with stone slabs or large potsherds. Children were buried in small jars. One pithos bore a geometric stamp seal. They ranged from single use to up to five re-burials. Grave goods were primarily pottery with a few bronze items including a toggle pin, 1 torque, and several bracelets. Two small trenches were excavated at the settlement to determine where it was safe to dump spoil and a sounding dug in the center of the small mound 150 meters to the north of the cemetery. Excavations continued, in eleven seasons until 1974. In 1964 a further 36 meter by 35 meter area of the cemetery was cleared raising the number of graves to 137 (with the maximum of reburials rising to eight). More pottery grave goods along with bronze or copper pins bracelets, rings, a disc ornament, and one toggle pin. A single stone macehead was found. A few "flat marble idols with disc-shaped heads and spade-shaped bodies" were excavated. The small mound at the settlement was found to contain a 10.75 meter by 7.20 meter house of 80 centimeter thick mudbrick walls with posts to support a second floor surrounded by a 50 centimeter thick oval mudbrick wall with 16 buttresses on the inner face. Twelve large one meter deep clay-lined pits were dug in the floor. The house had two main occupation phases. The first was plundered and destroyed in a conflagration and the second in a larger conflagration. Two terracotta stamp seals were found in the debris.

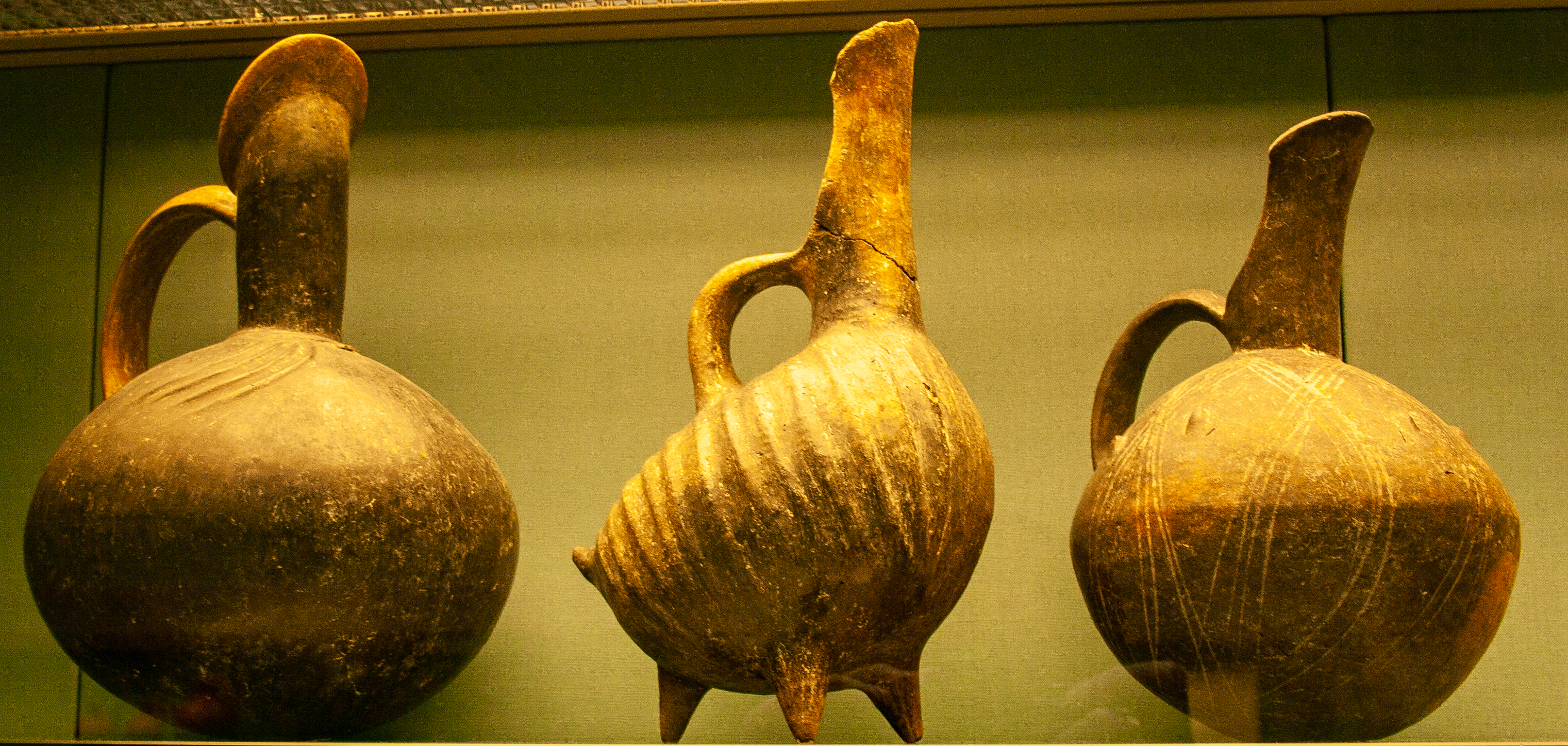
Yortan Cemetary jars

In succeeding years more trenches were opened in the cemetery and settlement. A number of home were found to have a megaron plan. Over 50 stone grave markers consisting of circles of stones were excavated in less eroded parts of the cemetery. Small amounts of wheel made pottery appeared in the latest occupation levels. It was determined that pebble paved ramp descended from the central small mound into the center of the settlement. New finds included beads, spindle whorls, and a fragmentary clay bulla. Additional excavations were conducted at nearby sites on the Emali Plain such as Karaburun and Boztepe.

The cemetery is about 110 meters north-south and about 200 meters east-west. While only partially excavated it is thought to have held about 2000 graves in total. The cemetery, divided into the Main Cemetery and Southeast cemetery, has been subject to some erosion which has removed covering soil about 100 graves. A total of 584 skeletons, 2/3 of adults, were recovered and examined by the team's anthropologist John Lawrence Angel. 567 were buried in pithoi, 16 in a simple inhumation, and one in a constructed tomb (Tomb 367) which was surrounded by a stone circle. A silver double-axe was found in that tomb which had been plundered both in antiquity and in modern times. Some of the skeletons had cylindrical wear of upper incisors from wool spinning activity and several had post-vertex head deformation common in Cypriote Late Bronze people, Modern analysis has determined that the average height of males at the site would have been 163.4±5.2 centimeters (about 5′4″). In 20% of males studied (n=64) and 12% of females (n=42) there were healed injuries primarily "ulnar parry fractures and healed and unhealed cranial trauma". One male had fatal cranial trauma on the occipital from an axe.

A few radiocarbon dates were determined at the site from a burnt building level resulting in an average value of 2362 +/- 26 BC (Early Bronze IIIa). The excavator dates the same level to the Early Bronze II period and considered this radiocarbon date to be too late.

It has been suggested, by the excavator, that a hutlike decoration on one of the pithoi (#57) matches Sign 24 on the Phaistos Disc.

== History ==
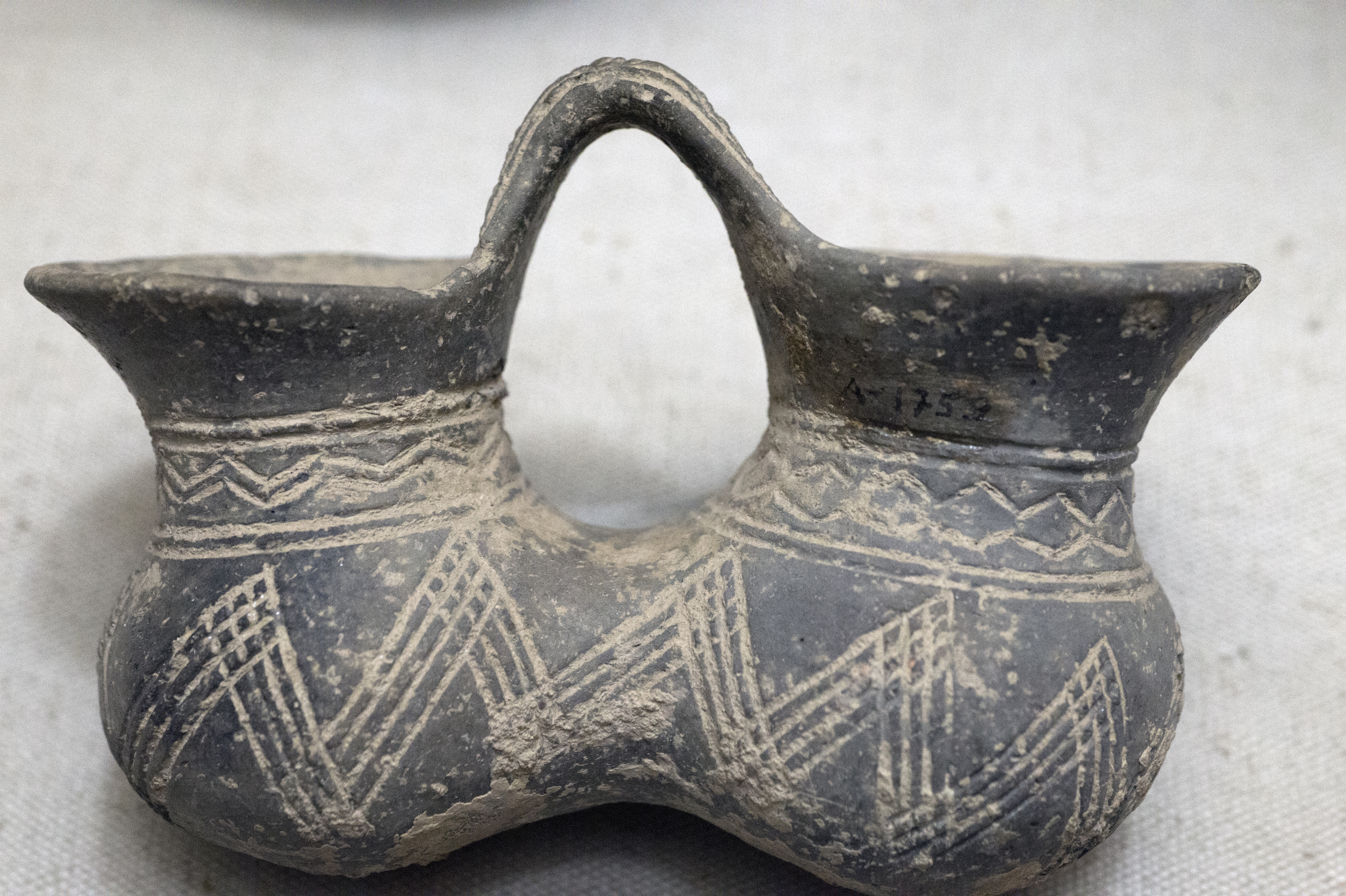
Twin cups, H. 7 cm. From the early 3rd millennium BC of the Early Bronze Age. Semayük-Karataş/Elmali

Graves in the cemetery were dated primarily to the Early Bronze II (3000–2700 BC) period and somewhat into the Early Bronze IIIa (2700–2500 BC) period. The small adjacent settlement is thought to have contained about 25 houses, which are taken to hold about 5 people each, over an area of about 2500 square meters. The most recent levels have been mostly lost to erosion and modern plowing. There was one large, well built palisaded mudbrick building on a slight central mound (50 meters by 40 meters and 3–4 meters high) with the rest of the residences on an adjacent lower terrace with apsidal houses and megaron type house beginning to appear in the Early Bronze II period. Though some remains from the Early Bronze I (3300–3000 BC) period were found its primary occupation was the same as the cemetery. It had three occupation levels. The most recent, Early Bronze III, remains were largely lost to erosion. Inhabitants at the site practiced extensive animal husbandry, maintaining cattle, pigs, goats, and sheep throughout the life of the settlement. A few remains were found from the Middle Bronze Age consisting of a few burials and their associated pottery. It has been suggested that the site primary dating was somewhat earlier.

== See also ==
- Alişar Hüyük
- Cities of the ancient Near East
- Chronology of the ancient Near East
- Titris Hoyuk
- Üçtepe Höyük
