= Josephine Platner Shear =

American classical archaeologist

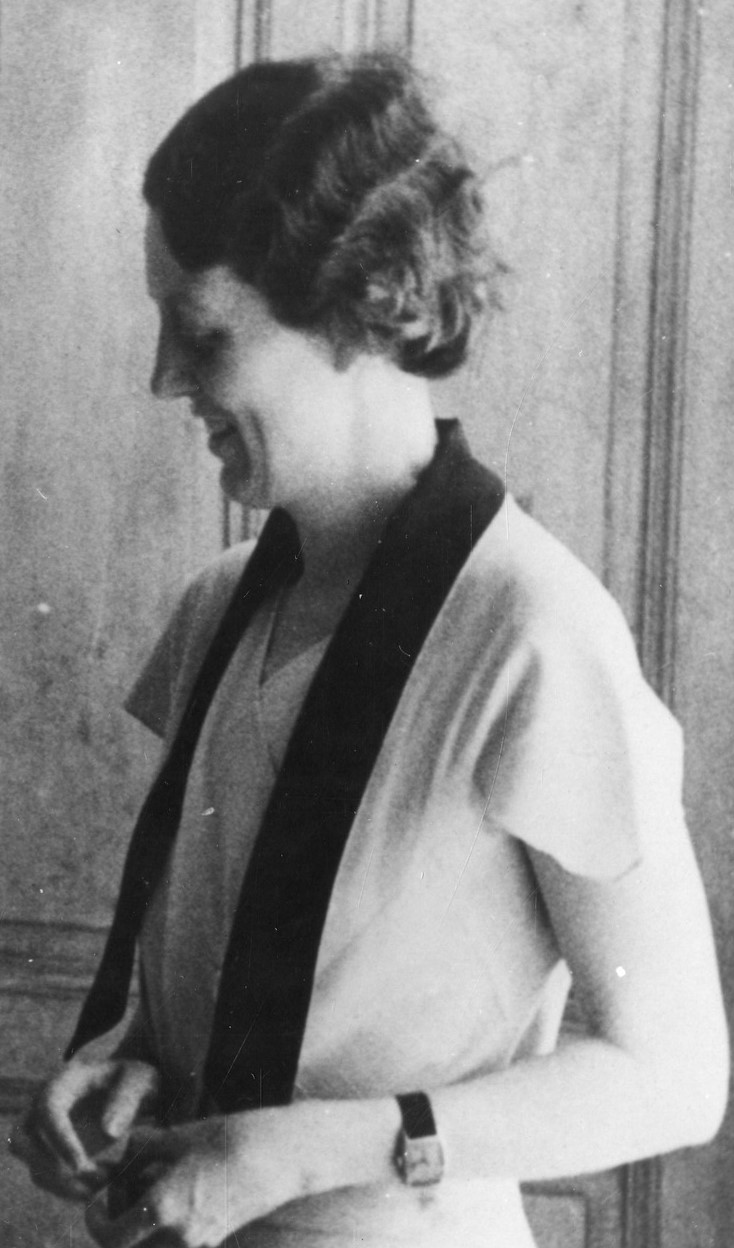
- Born: July 3, 1901
- Died: February 11, 1967 (aged 65)
- Education: Wellesley College; Columbia College
- Occupations: Archaeologist; numismatist
- Spouse: T. Leslie Shear (m. 1931; died 1945)

Josephine Platner Shear (3 July 1901 - 11 February 1967) was an American classical archaeologist and numismatist, who was excavation and numismatic lead for the Agora excavations.

== Biography ==
Josephine Platner was born on 3 July 1901 in Omaha, Nebraska. She studied at Wellesley College (1924) and Archaeology at Columbia University (1928). From 1927 to 1929 and from 1931 to 1939 she was a member and 1939/40 Fellow of the American School of Classical Studies at Athens. From 1929 to 1931 she took part in the excavations in Corinth. In 1930 she presented her work on geometric pottery from Corinth to the Archaeological Institute of America.

On 12 February 1931 she married the archaeologist Theodore Leslie Shear (1880-1945), who led the excavations in Corinth from 1925 to 1931 and in 1931 began the excavations on the Agora of Athens. Although Shear was director of the Corinth excavations, Platner Shear supervised the excavation in 1931, which took place in a small cemetery near the city's theater. The plans that Platner Shear created of the excavations are still referred to. Whilst her husband was at Princeton, she worked alongside him, and also lectured - including to the Women's College Club in 1936.

During the Agora excavation she led the study and conservation of numismatics from the site, as well as making the discovery of a new 2nd-century C.E. Athenian coin. Platner Shear kept meticulous records of the numismatic material: in the 1937 season alone, 10,325 coins were excavated and catalogued in the field.

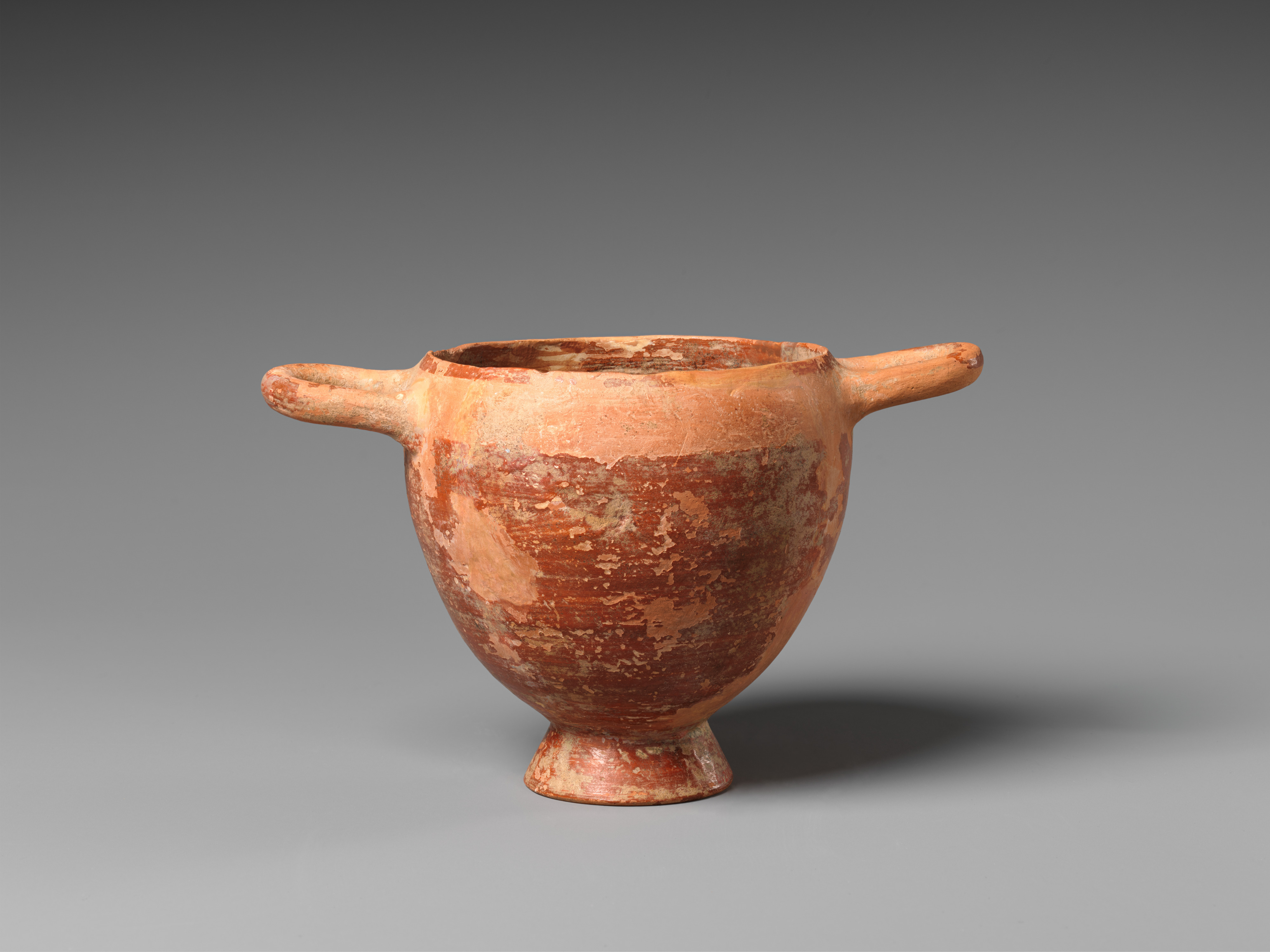
Skyphos donated by Platner Shear (Metropolitan Museum of Art)

After her husband's death in 1945, she continued to live in Princeton, and in 1955 her second marriage to Floyd C. Harwood took place. She died on 11 February 1967. Objects excavated by Platner Shear are held in the Metropolitan Museum of Art's collection.
