= Ancient Mesopotamia at the Dawn of Civilization =

- Author: Guillermo Algaze
- Publisher: University of Chicago Press
- Publication date: 2008

Ancient Mesopotamia at the Dawn of Civilization: The Evolution of an Urban Landscape is an ancient history monograph by Guillermo Algaze, published in 2008 by University of Chicago Press.

== See also ==
- A History of Babylonia and Assyria by Robert William Rogers.
