= Theresa Howard Carter =

American archaeologist, educator, and scholar (1929–2015)

- Born: Theresa Howard; May 15, 1929; Millbrook, New York
- Died: April 19, 2015 (aged 85); West Chester, Pennsylvania
- Occupations: Archaeologist, scholar

Academic background
- Education: Syracuse University (AB); University of Pennsylvania (MA); Bryn Mawr College (PhD)
- Thesis: Studies in Kassite History and Archaeology

Theresa Howard Carter (May 15, 1929 – April 19, 2015) was an archaeologist, educator, and scholar.

== Personal life and education ==
Carter was born on May 15, 1929, in Millbrook, New York, to Clarence K. Howard and Anne Warren Howard. She grew up on a dairy farm and attended Miss Howard's School, which was run at the farm by her aunt and namesake, Tess. When she reached the age of 13, Carter began attending the Millbrook Memorial School. Upon graduation she successfully pursued an A.B. in Anthropology at Syracuse University. She then went on to complete an M.A. in Anthropology at the University of Pennsylvania in 1954. During this time Carter joined the University of Pennsylvania Museum in 1950, serving as research assistant and excavation team member under Director Froelich Rainey, an affiliation she would continue throughout her career.

After completing her Masters, Carter earned her PhD in Near Eastern Archaeology, Classical Archaeology and Ancient History at Bryn Mawr College. Her doctoral dissertation was entitled “Studies in Kassite History and Archaeology” and was carried out under the supervision of Machteld Mellink. After her PhD, Carter would go on to serve as field director, excavator and surveyor at many sites across the Middle East and North Africa.

Carter was also an advocate for animals and the environment and performed volunteer work for organizations that supported these areas.

Carter married Edward C. Carter II with whom she had one daughter, Laura Coffin Carter. She and Edward later divorced and their daughter was killed by a stray bullet in a shootout between rival gangs in 1982 in Columbus, Ohio. Carter died on April 19, 2015, in West Chester, Pennsylvania, at the age of 85.

== Career ==
Theresa Howard Carter was one of the most important female archaeologists of the early 20th century, working at some of the greatest excavations in the Middle East, the Mediterranean, and North Africa. She joined the staff of the University of Pennsylvania Museum in 1950 as a research assistant and excavation team member, before becoming director of the American School of Oriental Research in Baghdad in 1965. In 1970, she joined the faculty of the Johns Hopkins University Department of Near Eastern Studies. From 1980–1987, Carter served as Chief Advisor to the Kuwait National Museum and Director of the Kuwait Archaeological Survey. In 1980, she bequeathed over 100 objects from her excavations of Carthaginian and Roman materials at Leptis Magna, in Libya, to the Penn Museum.

Carter is known for taking the first photographs of a tomb believed to be that of King Midas at Gordion in Turkey in the summer of 1957, working with director Rodney Young and his team from the University of Pennsylvania. She served as the director or co-director of multiple excavations, including Sybaris in Calabria, Italy; Leptis Magna in Libya; Elmali in Turkey; the Euphrates Valley in Syria; Tell Al-Rimah in Iraq; and Failaka in Kuwait.

Carter was at Failaka, an island off Kuwait, during the Iraq-Iran war, less than 80 miles away from the fighting, when she refused to stop digging in the ruins of a Greek settlement more than 2,000 years old, until it became impossible to continue.

== Memberships ==
- Archaeological Institute of America
- American Oriental Society
- Middle East Institute
- Fellow of the Royal Geographical Society in London
- Fellow of the Middle East Studies Association

== Awards and recognition ==
In 1974, Carter was awarded the Distinguished Service Award from Kuwait University and in 1990, she was awarded the George Arents Pioneer Medal for achievement in a professional field from Syracuse University, the highest alumni award. Carter also served on the board of directors of the Theatre of Living Arts in Philadelphia from 1964 to 1967.
