= Guillermo Algaze =

Cuban anthropologist

- Born: November 24, 1954 (age 71); Havana, Cuba
- Citizenship: Cuba (birthplace), United States (naturalized)
- Education: University of Puerto Rico; University of Chicago
- Known for: A 2003 MacArthur "Genius" Award.
- Scientific career
- Fields: Anthropology
- Thesis: Mesopotamian expansion and its consequences: informal empire in the late fourth millennium B.C. (1986)
- Doctoral advisors: Robert M. Adams; Helene Juliet Kantor; McGuire Gibson

Guillermo Algaze (born November 24, 1954) is a Cuban-born American anthropologist and recipient of a 2003 MacArthur Award, Algaze is a former chair of the anthropology department at University of California, San Diego, and project director of the Titris Hoyuk excavation in southern Turkey.

== Life and education ==
Algaze was born on November 24, 1954, in Havana, Cuba, and was raised in Puerto Rico. He graduated from the University of Puerto Rico in 1976. Algaze later moved to the continental United States, and became a citizen. In 1986, he earned his doctorate from the University of Chicago. He joined the University of California, San Diego faculty in 1990, where he has taught as a professor and has served as the chair of the anthropology department. He currently is a distinguished professor in the UCSD anthropology department.

== Academic work ==
Algaze's archaeological interests have mostly been around Mesopotamian history and culture. His work has contributed to a vast amount of information in relation to Mesopotamia. In the 1990s, Algaze was a major proponent of an anthropological theory on the spread of civilisation from the Euphrates valley area and ancient Mesopotamia, arguing that colonial expansion from south to north (from the area that is currently southern Iraq) was responsible for the establishment of city-states in northern Iraq and Syria and southeastern Turkey. Following discoveries in the new millennium, Algaze says he has been "eating a lot of crow", acknowledging that evidence suggests societies in the northern area emerged simultaneously and independently of the Mesopotamian expansion.

In 2003 he received the MacArthur Genius Award, for his work studying the imperialism and colonialism of ancient civilizations, particularly the Uruk expansion in ancient Mesopotamia.

== List of works ==
- Algaze, Guillermo (November 2008). Ancient Mesopotamia at the Dawn of Civilization: The Evolution of an Urban Landscape. University of Chicago Press. ISBN 978-0-226-01377-0.
- Algaze, Guillermo (June 2005). The Uruk World System: The Dynamics of Expansion of Early Mesopotamian Civilization, Second Edition. University of Chicago Press. ISBN 978-0-226-01382-4.

== Bibliography ==
- Akkermans, Peter M. M. G.; Schwartz, Glenn M. (2003). The Archaeology of Syria: From Complex Hunter-Gatherers to Early Urban Societies (c. 16,000-300 BC). Cambridge University Press. ISBN 0-521-79666-0.
- Matthews, Roger (2003). The Archaeology of Mesopotamia: Theories and Approaches. Routledge. ISBN 0-415-25316-0.
