= Titris Hoyuk =

Archaeological site in Turkey

- Titriş Höyük
- Location within Turkey
- 37°28′34″N 38°40′38″E
- Type: settlement
- Periods: Bronze Age
- Cultures: Early Dynastic, Roman, Islamic, Medieval
- Location: Turkey

History
- Built: c. 2700 BC
- Abandoned: End of 3rd millennium BC

Site notes
- Excavation dates: 1983, 1991–1996, 1998–1999
- Archaeologists: T. J. Wilkinson, Guillermo Algaze
- Condition: Ruined
- Owner: Public
- Public access: Yes

Titris Hoyuk (also Titriş Höyük) is an ancient Near East archaeological site in Turkey. It lies 45 kilometers north of Şanlıurfa and 14 kilometers east of Samsat, near the Euphrates River valley and 11.5 kilometers southeast of the site of Lidar Höyük. It is a two-period site from the 3rd millennium BC. Unlike most archaeological sites in the region, the primary focus has been on excavating non-elite, mostly domestic, areas rather than elite spaces. It has been suggested that the city name was Dulu in the 3rd millennium BC. A small modern village, Bahçeli, lies adjacent to the east. The lake formed by the construction of the Ataturk Dam, which inundated the related archaeological sites of Hassek Höyük, Lidar Höyük and Kurban Höyük lies about one mile to the northwest.

== History ==
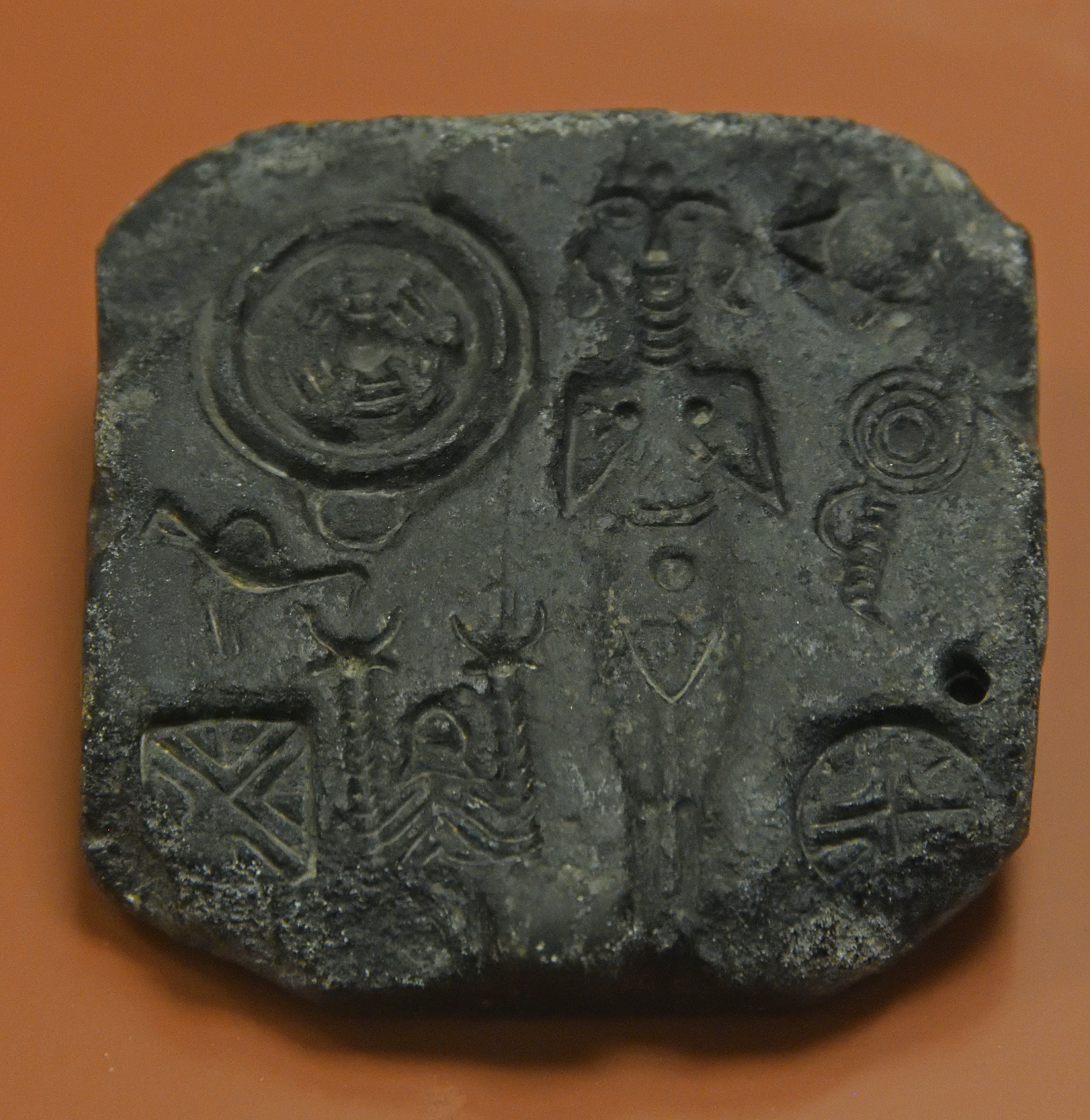
Early Bronze Age "Trinket Mould" from Titriş Höyük

The main mound, 3.3 hectares in area and rising 30 meters above the plane, was occupied from the Chalcolithic through the Islamic periods (including the Hellenistic, Roman, and Medieval periods) and has not yet been excavated.

=== Early Early Bronze ===
Remains from the early Early Bronze Age (c. 3100-2600 BC) were found in a single deep sondage in the lower town, lying on virgin soil. Ocupational remains at that point were about 4.5 meters deep. Other soundings and excavation in the lower and outer town showed no remains of that date though it was assumed the site was occupied in that period on the thinly investigated main mound. The early Early Bronze Age level showed three phases and finds included three cist graves.

=== Middle Early Bronze ===
In the Middle Early Bronze Age (c. 2600/2500-2400 BC), it reached a size of 43 hectares, counting suburban areas, developing in an unplanned manner from the center. This was a time when other northern Mesopotamian sites also experienced significant growth including Tell Brak and Tell Mardikh. There were production areas for Canaanean blades on the outskirts.

=== Late Early Bronze ===
In the Late Early Bronze Age (c. 2400/2300-2100 BC) the site contracted to 35 hectares with the abandonment of its suburban areas. This phase of development was centrally planned with regular streets and terraces. It also gained a 3-meter wide mud brick (with stone foundations) fortification wall complete with a moat. This phase ended by the close of the 3rd millennium BC. A group burial at the end of this phase has been interpreted as the result of a massacre or possibly the result of a battle. In the following several centuries pit graves were cut into the abandoned buildings. A duck shaped weight (weighing 1 mana, about 500 grams) inscribed with the name of an official of the Akkadian ruler Shu-durul (c. 2168–2154 BC) was recovered from a looted context.

During this final phase large mudbrick fortification walls, with stone foundations and associated moats with sloping layers of densely packed clay and crushed limestone, were constructed around the Lower and Outer towns and increased perimortem injuries are noted in skeletal remains.

== Archaeology ==
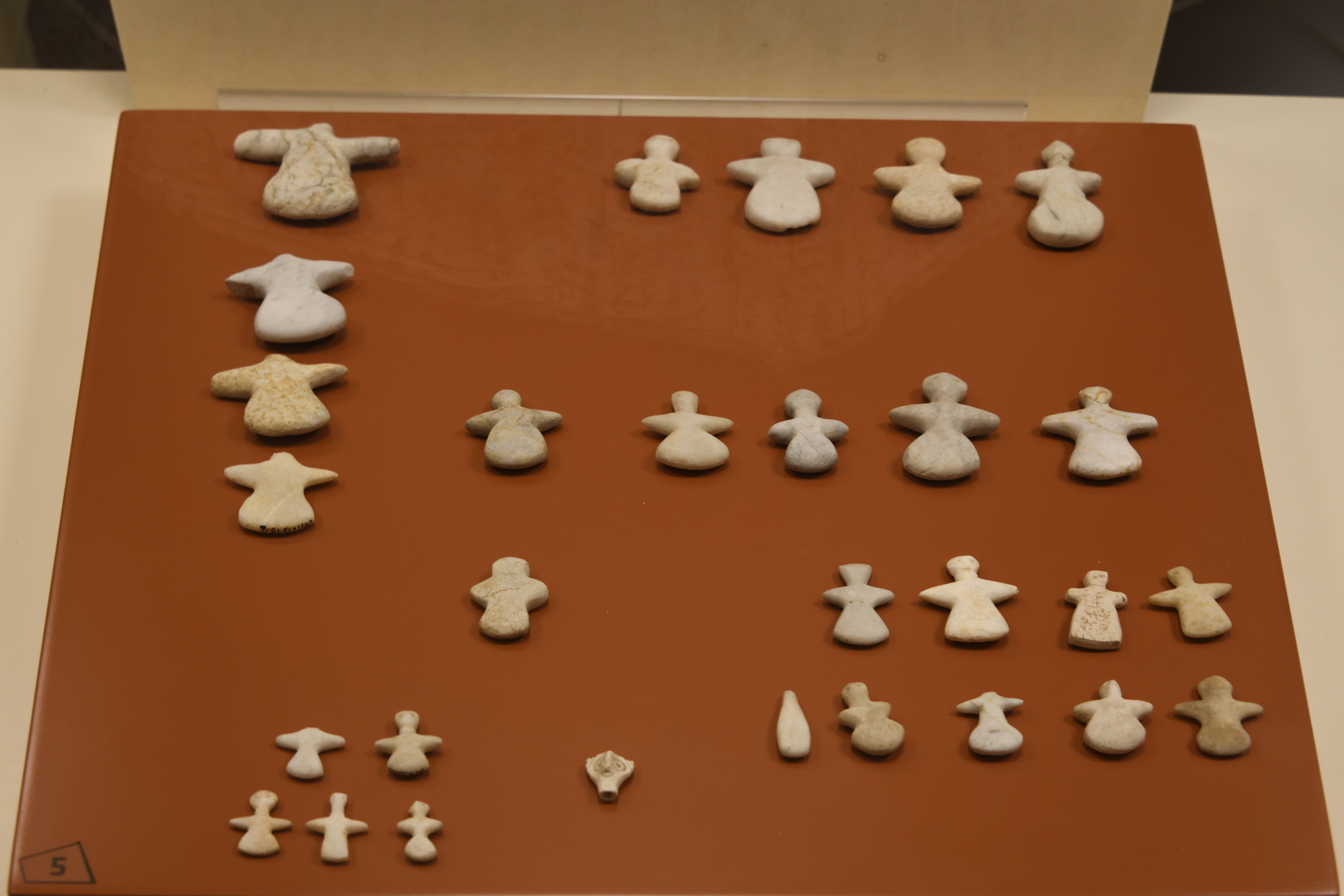
Urfa museum Idols from Titriş Höyük – Bronze age 4855

The site was examined in 1983 as part of the Oriental Institute Chicago Euphrates Archaeological Survey led by T. J. Wilkinson which performed an intensive survey from 1980 until 1984 of the area around Kurban Höyük (Lower Karababa Basin) in advance of its inundation by the Ataturk Dam. They reported (within a total area of about 30 hectares):

- a 200 meter by 180 meter multiperiod main mound, flat top with a roughly 130 meter long axis, with a height of between 15 and 20 meters above the plain. It had an area at the base of about 3.25 hectares. A cut in the southeast corner exposed cultural deposits.
- a 400 meter by 150 meter lower elongated mound extending west from the main mound covering an area of about 6.25 hectares and with a curtain wall at the western end. Surface finds indicated occupation in the late Early Bronze period, possibly extending into the early Middle Bronze and occupation depth estimated at 2 meters.
- a 700 meter by 400 meter (about 16.5 hectares) outer town with occupation depth estimate at 1 meters and again late Early Bronze period, possibly extending into the early Middle Bronze. A modern village was noted, adjacent to the east of the outer town.

Eight seasons of excavation (with one study season) were conducted and directed by Guillermo Algaze between 1991 and 1999. Work in these excavations was restricted to non-elite areas, in the Lower Town (which extends east and west of the main mound) and in the Outer Town (north of the main mound) with one sounding on the main mound. Over 16 hectares of the site were subjected to a magnetometry survey.

A number of cist graves were found at Titris Hoyuk. At the start of excavation those graves were in the process of being looted by local peasants. Among the finds from those grave was a bone cylinder seal with a typical Early Dynastic III contest scene style (now at the Urfa Museum). In 1981 a workman brought in an inscribed one mana duck weight to the archaeologists excavating at the site of Kurban Höyük, stating that it had been found at the site of Titris Hoyuk. The inscription named an official of the Akkadian Empire ruler Shu-durul (c. 2168–2154 BC). It is assumed to have been plundered from one of the cist graves at Titris Hoyuk.

An Early Bronze Age lead mold used to produce lead ornaments was found at Titris Höyük. It was used to produce objects including a "pendant carving ‘in the shape of a reed hut framed with two poles, each of which are capped with a single bullhead".

In the final Late Early Bronze Age phase, along with the abandonment of the suburban areas and construction of fortifications, the Inter Town and Outer Town were rebuilt with wide roads and alleyways, showing central planning. With the cemetery going out of use burials now became intramural. At this time, especially in the Inner Town vs the Outer Town, grave goods became much richer. These included man metal objects like bronze toggle pins, earrings, rings (some in silver), semi-precious stone necklaces,and weapons. At this time wine production, residence based, became widespread. Most homes held a plaster basin showing remnants of tartaric acid resulting from the production of wine.

A notable find was a burial from the late Early Bronze age where

"a reused plastered basin found inside a room at the corner of two streets in the Outer Town. This contained 17 human crania arranged in a circle facing outwards and surrounding a pile of long bones and other body parts"

A full analysis showed found 12 male adults with cranial trauma, 3 female adults, 1 with cranial trauma), 1 unspecified adult with cranial trauma, and 3 children with no skull. This led to suggestions that a massacre had occurred.

== See also ==
- Cities of the ancient Near East
- Hassek Höyük
- Karataş-Semayük
- Kazane Höyük
- Tilbeş Höyük
