= Intramural burial =

Type of human burial in the home or church

Intramural burial is a type of human burial in which the remains are interred indoors at a location that is in active use for other purposes. In the context of premodern times, such as in Çatalhöyük and the Bronze Age Aegean, the term refers to the practice of burying humans inside homes and dwelling places. In studies of Classical antiquity, such as of Sparta, the term intramural burial generally refers to burial within a city's walls. When a city lacked walls, the term intracommunal burial is also used. In modern usage, such as in 19th-century England, intramural burial is used to describe burial of individuals in churchyards within parish or city limits, as opposed to taking them to graveyards in the surrounding areas.

== Within the household ==
The custom of intramural burial is likely to have originated in the area of Northern Syria and Southeast Anatolia, and spread out radially over several millennia. In the 20th century, historians regarded intramural burial as a primitive custom that would be phased out as humans centralized in larger settlements. However, the practice actually represents a development in the complexity of human burials, and its spread was made possible in part by the development of city-states in the 3rd millennium BC, including Ur, Kish, Mari, and others.

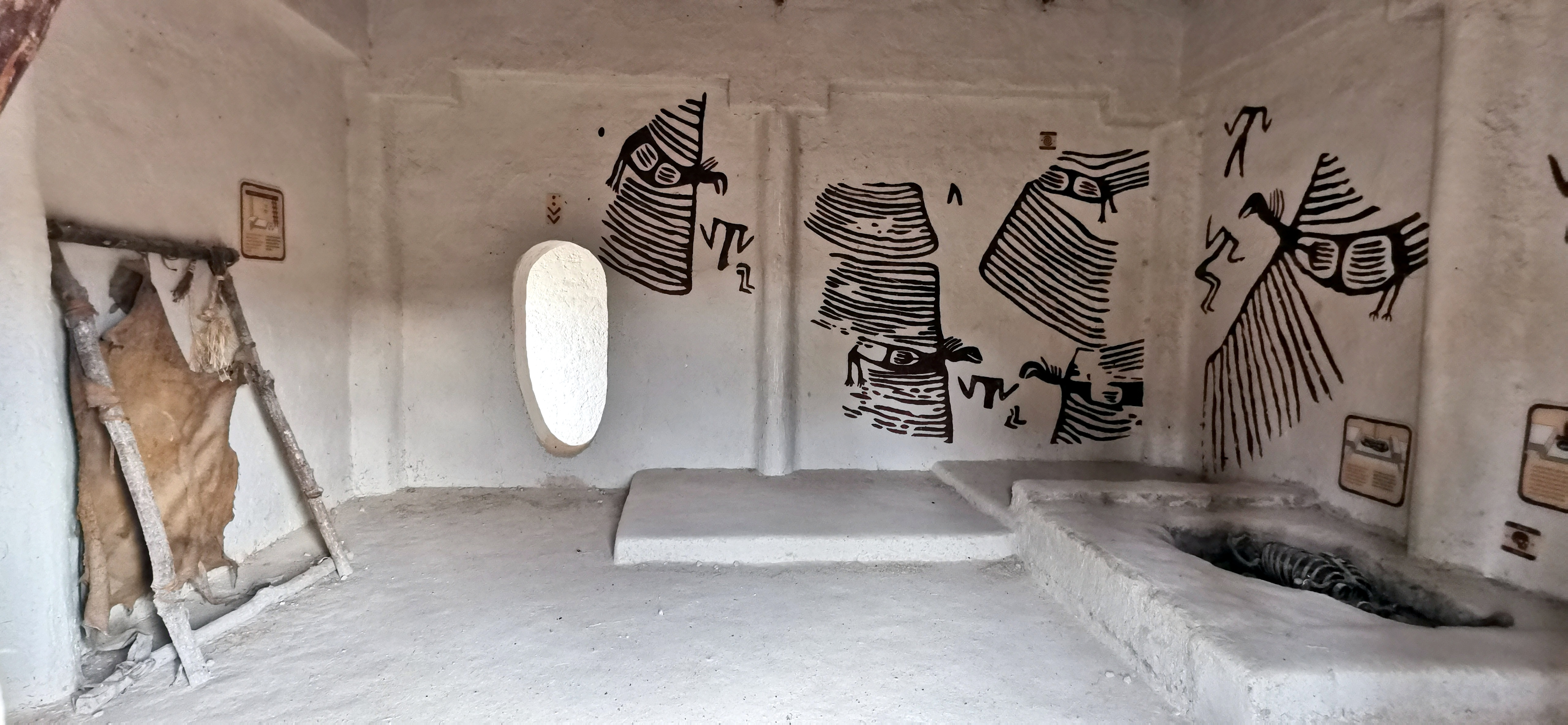
Intramural burials took place at Çatalhöyük under the floors of dwellings.

Çatalhöyük was a Neolithic village in Anatolia inhabited by a total of 2,000–5,000 people over the course of its history. The majority of burials in Çatalhöyük were not in middens or locations outside the village, but inside still-occupied homes. Adults were most frequently placed under platforms and floors, usually in the north and east corners of the building. Children and infants were more regularly found in the southern portions of the home. Most of the burials of all ages took place in the central common room of the house, where cooking and sleeping would have taken place. Over the course of years, bodies would repeatedly be exposed when burying new corpses. It was also common for bones to be removed, re-arranged, or replaced into various burial sites. This practice indicates that the inhabitants of Çatalhöyük were intimately familiar with the dead, who continued to be a part of the household even after death.

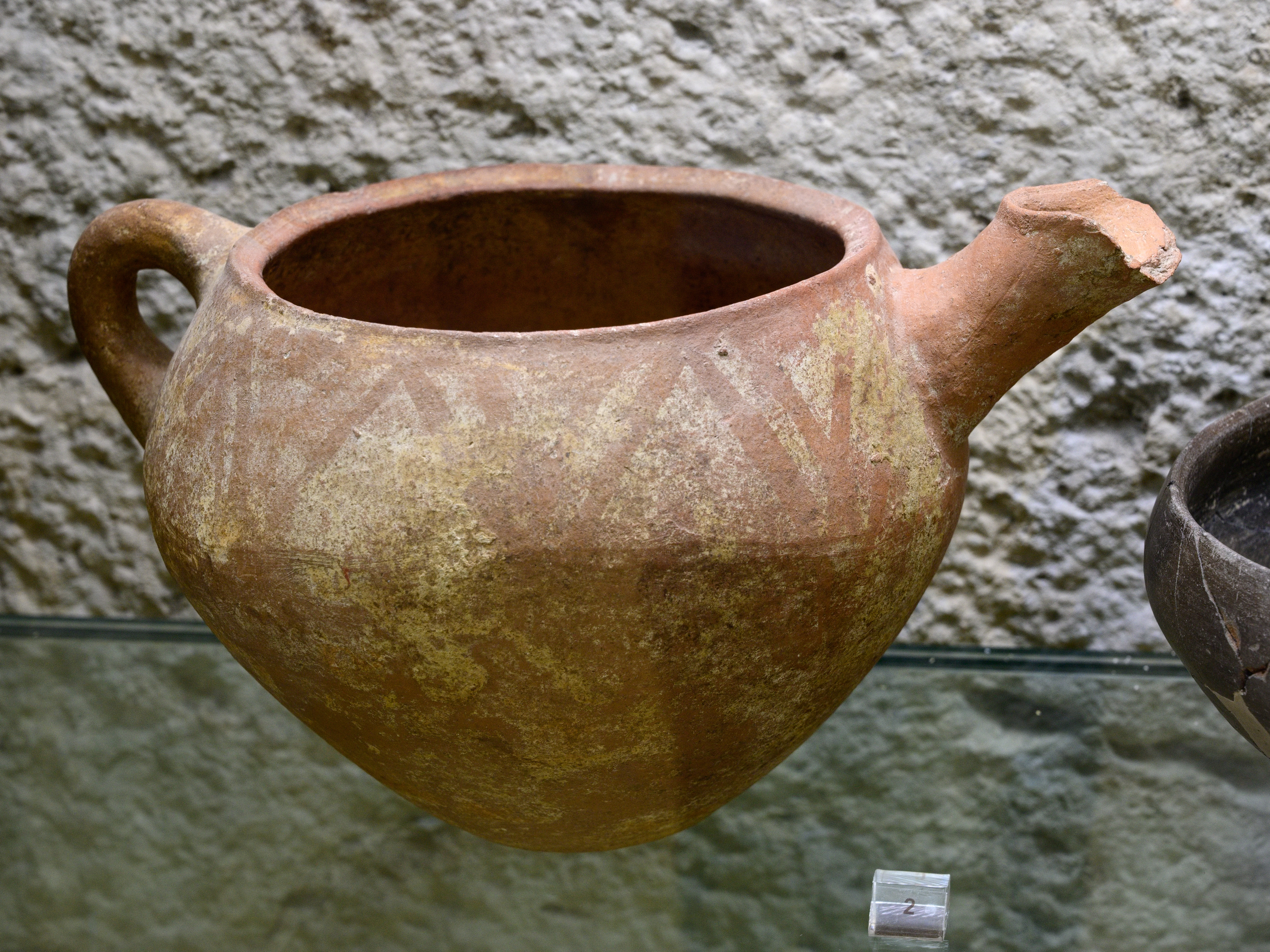
Infants and children were buried in jars in much of Greece during the Middle Bronze Age.

Another center for intramural burials was in the Bronze Age Aegean. The earliest examples of the practice are found at Knossos during the aceramic Neolithic. Other locations with high concentrations of intramural burials are found in the Middle Bronze Age at Asine and Ayios Stephanos. A variation of the practice in Greece and elsewhere in the Near East was internment within large jars or cists which were then buried in the house. This custom apparently had religious connotations, and mentions of it are made in the Ugaritic Baal Epic and Tale of Aqhat. Even after burials in organized cemeteries supplanted intramural burials, infants and children continued to be buried in cooking jars. One reason for this may be that infants had not yet passed the rite of separation into the community, and as such would have been excluded from communal burial sites.

The practice continued to spread, and is first recorded as occurring in the Euphrates valley in the second half of the 3rd millennium. The first example is a hypogeum built underneath an inhabited building at Til Barsip. Elsewhere, family tombs were constructed underneath or as a part of temple and palace structures. Another new feature was the practice of family burials, in which members of an extended family would be buried in a developing necropolis within their city. One well-attested example of intramural burial in this period is at Titris Hoyuk in Southeastern Anatolia. From 2600 to 2400 BC, the site grew from a small village to a regional capital. As it expanded, the town moved from practicing cist burials at a cluster of tombs outside the town, towards cist tombs in almost every inhabited structure within the town. However, the location of these tombs and their relation to the dwelling places is less direct. Instead of being buried under the central room, tombs at Titris Hoyuk were located in courtyards or side storerooms.

== Within the city walls ==
In studies of Classical Greece, the term intramural refers to burials that took place within the walls of a city-state. In cases where a city lacked walls, the term intracommunal burial is sometimes used. In most of Greece, the practice of intracommunal burial was largely abolished by the end of the Geometric period (that is, by c. 700 BC). However, in Sparta the practice remained common into later periods, and there were no restrictions on being buried intracommunally. Burial inside the city occurred alongside burial in organized cemeteries outside the city. Instead of intramural tombs being present in most houses, in Sparta they were concentrated in buildings along important roads through the city and on several slopes near the Palaiokastro hill. One reason for these burials was to lay symbolic claims to one's land within the city by burying family members on that land.

== Within churchyards ==
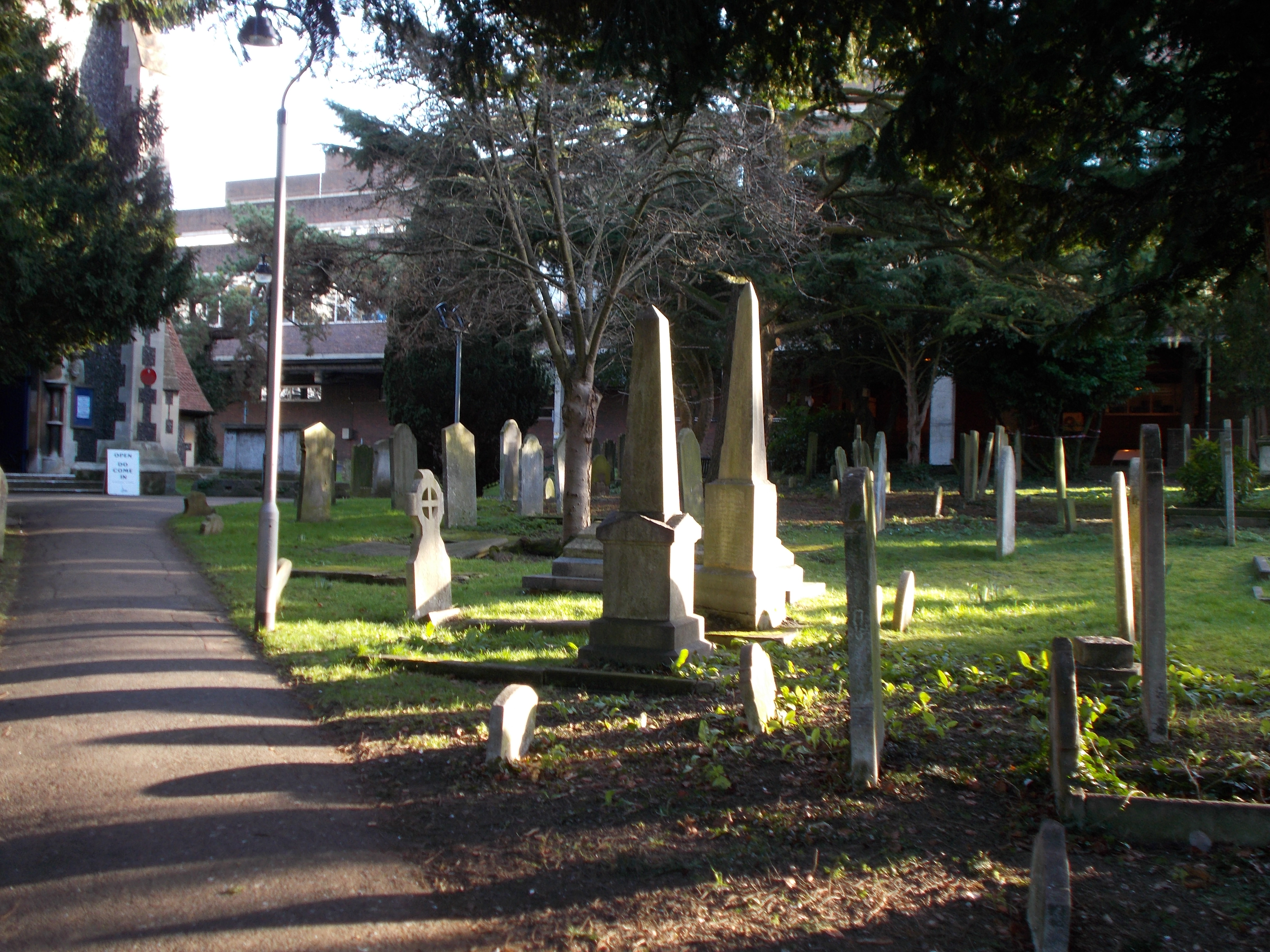
Graves at the St Nicholas Churchyard in Sutton

By the 19th century, most European states had passed laws restricting the practice known as intramural burial, which was then defined as interring the dead in churchyards as opposed to unconsecrated public cemeteries. This reform was linked to a growing concern over exposure to graveyard miasmas. It was believed that diseased air would accumulate in graveyards, especially those with poor ventilation and dense burials. As such, the preference moved towards spread-out cemeteries outside cities and on open hills (for exposure to dry wind).

However, the practice continued in Britain due to its close ties with religious politics. Legislation that addressed hygiene, such as the Public Health Act 1848, did not include stipulations against intramural burial. Resistance to reform came in part from churches which were concerned with losing income from burials. Furthermore, parallels were drawn between the overly-organized cemeteries and prison reform, with the secular graveyards being likened to "panopticons for the dead". One example of this mindset came in 1855, when Archdeacon of London William Hale authored a charge to the clergy of London titled Intramural Burial in England Not Injurious to the Public Health, in which he argued in defense of the practice of intramural burial.

A series of Burial Acts beginning in the 1850s started the process of ending intramural burial in England. The system for closing churchyards was formalised, inspections of churchyards were carried out, and loans were given by a Board of Health to create new sanitary graveyards.
