= Charles Knapp (scholar) =

United States classical philologist (1868–1936)

- Born: June 22, 1868; New York City, New York
- Died: September 17, 1936 (aged 68)
- Occupation: Professor
- Spouse: Theresa Shaw (m. 1889)

Charles Knapp (22 June 1868 – 17 September 1936) was an American classical scholar.

== Biography ==
Knapp was born in New York City. He graduated from Columbia University at the age of 19 and received a PhD there in 1890, aged 22, having been a prize fellow from 1887 to 1890. He was a tutorial fellow in Latin (1890–1891), then an instructor in Latin and Greek (1891–1902), and adjunct professor of classical philology (1902–1906). In 1906, he became a professor of classical philology at Barnard College, a women's liberal arts college affiliated with Columbia University.

Knapp was well liked by his students, as recorded in Barnard College: The First Fifty Years, a history of the college published by Columbia University.

Dr. Knapp used to say to his freshmen that he and they were alike travelers on the road of learning, and the space between was so small, in comparison with the length of the road, that it need be no hindrance to pleasant companionship thereon. Throughout his long teaching life this was his characteristic attitude, and his students recognized that his passion for intellectual honesty and hard work were equaled by his kindness and enthusiasm.

== Writings ==
- Stories from Aulus Gellius (1895)
- Selections from Viri Romae (1896), in collaboration with R. Arrowsmith
- The Æneid of Virgil (1901, books I-VI, selections VII-XII) The dedication for this book reads: "To my sister, Miss Adeline Knapp, A.B., I am under especial obligations for valuable help in all parts of the book."

Knapp contributed to the American Journal of Philology, the Classical Journal, Classical Philology, the Classical Review, and the Classical Weekly (of which he became managing editor in 1906). He also contributed articles on classical subjects to encyclopedic works.

== Family ==
In 1889, Knapp married Theresa Shaw in Manhattan, New York. Together, they had one son, Charles M. Knapp, born 21 September 1892.
