= Rodney Young (archaeologist) =

American archaeologist (1907–1974)

Rodney Stuart Young
- Young at the excavations of Gordium
- Born: August 1, 1907; Bernardsville, New Jersey
- Died: October 25, 1974 (aged 67); Chester Springs, Pennsylvania
- Education: Princeton University (Ph.D., 1940)
- Occupation: Near Eastern archaeologist
- Known for: Gordion, and chief of the OSS' "Greek Desk"

Rodney Stuart Young (born August 1, 1907, in Bernardsville, New Jersey – died October 25, 1974, in Chester Springs, Pennsylvania) was an American Near Eastern archaeologist. He is known for his excavation of the city of Gordium, capital of the ancient Phrygians and associated with the legendary king, Midas.

Young received an A.B. in Classics from Princeton University in 1929, and then an M.A. from Columbia University in 1932, written under the direction of William Dinsmoor, Sr. In 1940 Young earned his Ph.D. in classics and archaeology from Princeton University. He had excavated in the agora at Athens before becoming curator of the Mediterranean Section of the University of Pennsylvania Museum of Archaeology and Anthropology and Professor of Classical Archaeology at the University of Pennsylvania in 1950, where he helped to build the graduate program known today as the Graduate Group in the Art and Archaeology of the Mediterranean World. He was elected to the American Philosophical Society in 1965. At the same juncture, Young began a series of new excavations at Gordium and continued as director until his untimely death in 1974.

His major work on Phrygian tumuli, including the famed "Midas Mound" or Tumulus MM, was published posthumously. After his death, the leadership of the excavations eventually passed to his student, G. Kenneth Sams, later professor of Classical Archaeology at the University of North Carolina at Chapel Hill. Among the scholars who also worked on this excavation team was the archaeologist Theresa Howard Carter.

== World War II ==
During World War II, Young volunteered in Greece as an ambulance driver that his father helped finance. He was wounded on the Epirus front and received a Bronze Star from the United States and the Croix de Guerre from Greece for his services after the war.

Young was enlisted into the Office of Strategic Services (OSS) by General William J. Donovan when World War II began. Founded by Donovan, the OSS was the precursor to the CIA. Young may even have brought General Donovan to the Epirus front in his ambulance. Due to his leadership, cleverness, unsurpassed knowledge of the Greeks — and his fluency in Greek and Turkish — he was identified by William Donovan as a prime asset for America's fledgling intelligence service and was appointed as the chief of OSS operations in Greece — the "Greek Desk".

Young appointed John Vassos to head the newly-created "Spy School" in Cairo, Egypt. He instructed Vassos to write a manual for his prospective spies in the Secret Intelligence (SI) and Special Operations branches (SO) of the Office of Strategic Services at the secluded "Spy School". This clandestine training center where Young's agents were trained was situated in an upper-class suburb of Cairo along the Nile River, known to OSS as "Area A" or Ras el Kanayas. The Greek Desk sent agents who were trained in the "Spy School" on missions behind enemy lines primarily to Greece and the Balkans.

== Post-war accomplishments ==
Young was active in his field, serving as president of the Archaeological Institute of America from 1968 to 1972 and was Charles Elliot Norton Lecturer in 1968/1969. His professional interests concentrated on Greek and Phrygian archaeology, art, and history, the Early Iron Age, and early writing.

== Death ==
Young died in an automobile accident near his home in Chester Springs, Pennsylvania.

== Bibliography ==
- Late geometric graves and a seventh century well in the Agora (1939).
- Gordion; a guide to the excavations and museum (1968).
- Rodney S. Young; Keith DeVries; E. L. Kohler. Three great early tumuli. Philadelphia : University Museum, University of Pennsylvania, 1981. ISBN 9780934718394.
