= Kerameikos steles =

Collection of steles found in Kerameikos, Athens

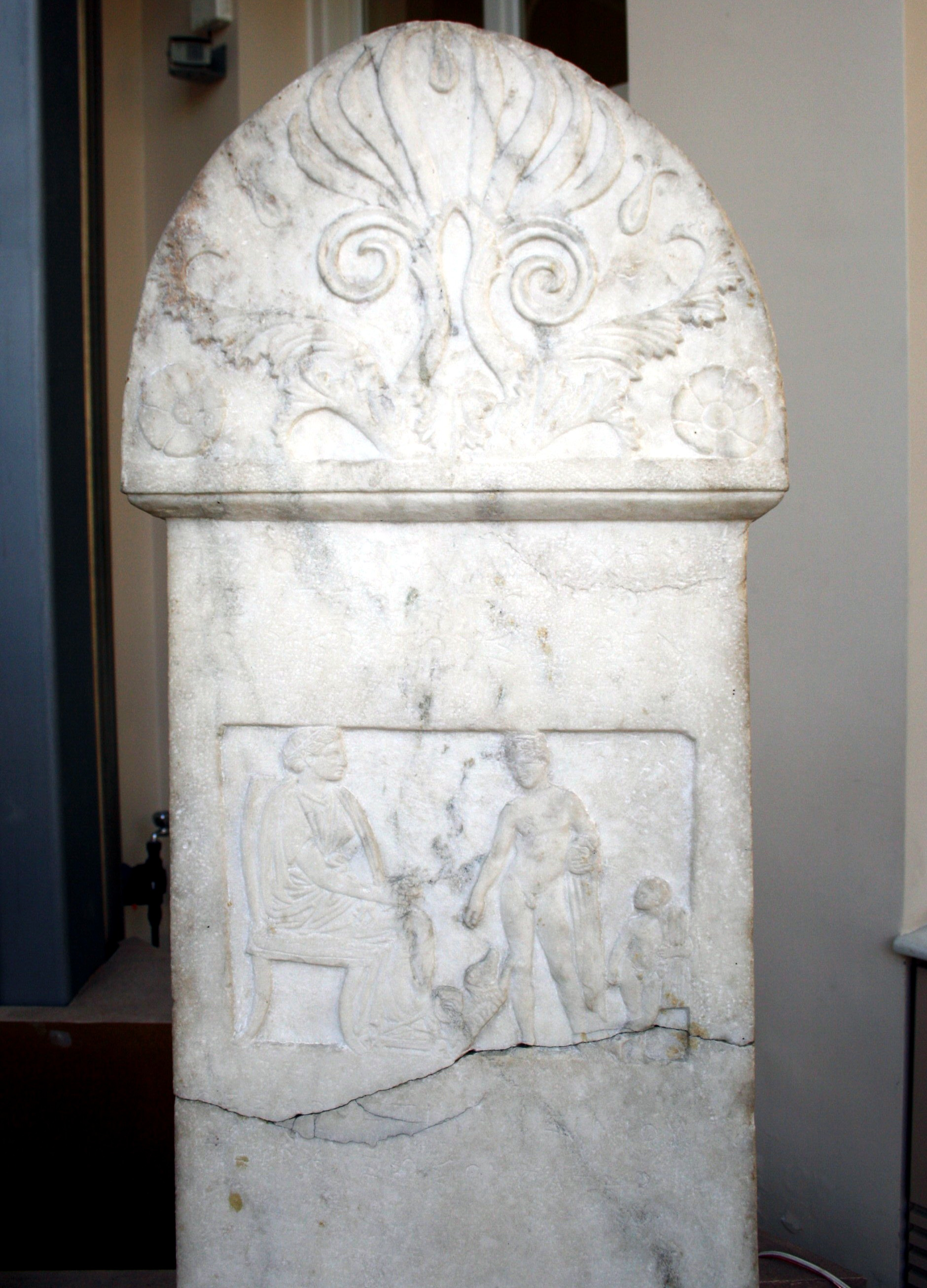
Marble stele for Pathane and Polykrates. Probably a husband and wife. Relief depicts one figure sitting and two others (a woman and a child) standing beside him.

The Kerameikos steles are a collection of sculptures used as grave-markers (steles, sing. stele) in the Kerameikos necropolis of Attica. Kerameikos is located outside the Themistoclean Wall's Dipylon Gate. Stelai come in various shapes/designs and depict images varying from pottery to narrative scenes. They were often marble or limestone, and were carved or sculpted to depict the person being memorialized sometimes with relatives or slaves. Reliefs decorating the graves were meant to show the dead in their best light, using imagery to recognize their bravery in battle, or pathos, or wealth. These monuments marked the graves of Athenian men, fallen warriors, as well as non-citizens. Women were also included in Kerameikos but typically it was the wealthiest or prominent women who were given stele. In many vase paintings of grave scenes wreaths are seen resting at the base of stele. This was likely a popular way to adorn the graves of loved ones.

== History ==
The first steles were dated from the Early Bronze Age, around 2000 B.C. The use of steles as grave markers gained popularity in Kerameikos around the Protogeometric period c.a. 950 B.C.E. until they fell out of style around the 8th century C.E. The site was first excavated in 1870 by German archaeologists looking for grave-goods. Many of the fragments and inscriptions found in the present came from the remnants of the Themistoclean Walls, which were built after the Persian Wars, using any and all stone available. Many graves and buildings had been destroyed so they were used as building material.

== Styles ==
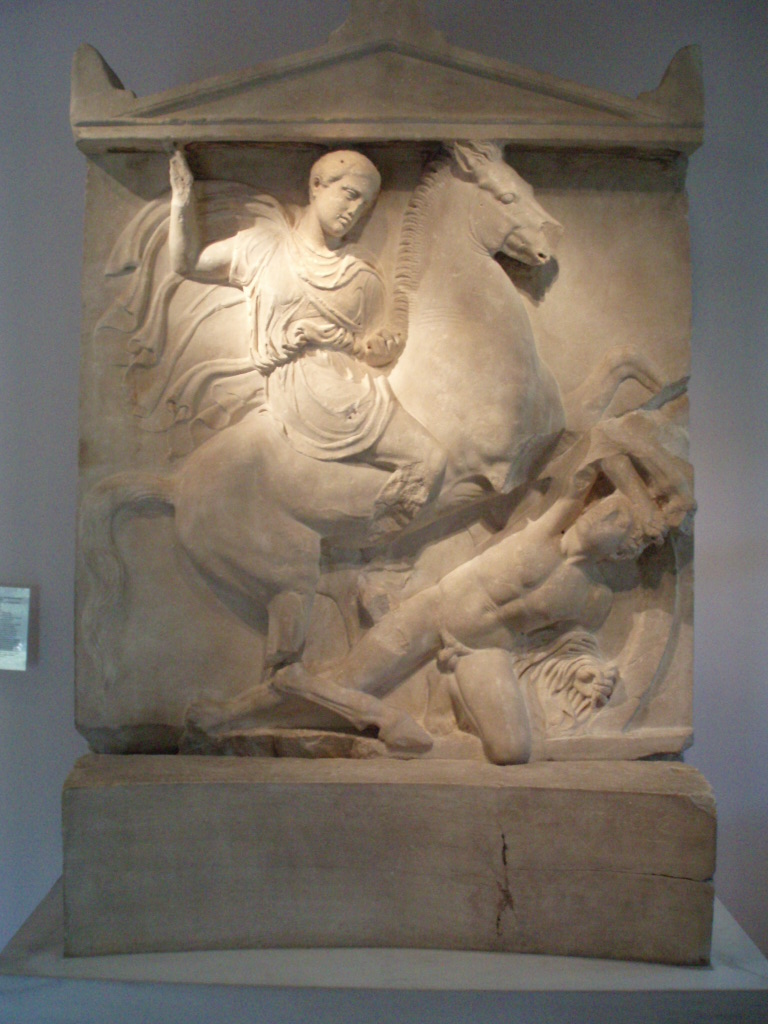
Grave Stele of Dexileos.

Athenians used Kerameikos for centuries to bury their dead. Over time different styles were introduced so there is a great variety of graves that came from Kerameikos. Notable styles found in Kerameikos include the naiskos stele, lekythos graves, and kore. Some grave-markers in Kerameikos were set with high bases for sculptures that could be seen from afar, such as the burial monument of Dionysios of Kollitos or the recumbent bull in the British Museum.

Graves were inscribed with the name of the deceased and where they came from.

Some steles at Kerameikos used a style known as naiskos ("small temple"), which looks like a temple with columns and a pediment at the top. This particular symbol of wealth gained popularity in the 5th century B.C. examples include the Grave Stele of Dexileos, the Funerary naiskos of Demetria and Pamphile, and the Grave Stele of Hegeso.

== Notable burials and graves ==
After the Battle of Chairon and Thibrachos, Lacedaemonian soldiers of King Pausanias' army were buried at Kerameikos. The tomb was found marked by a marble plinth with Lacedaemonian inscriptions of the names of the men.

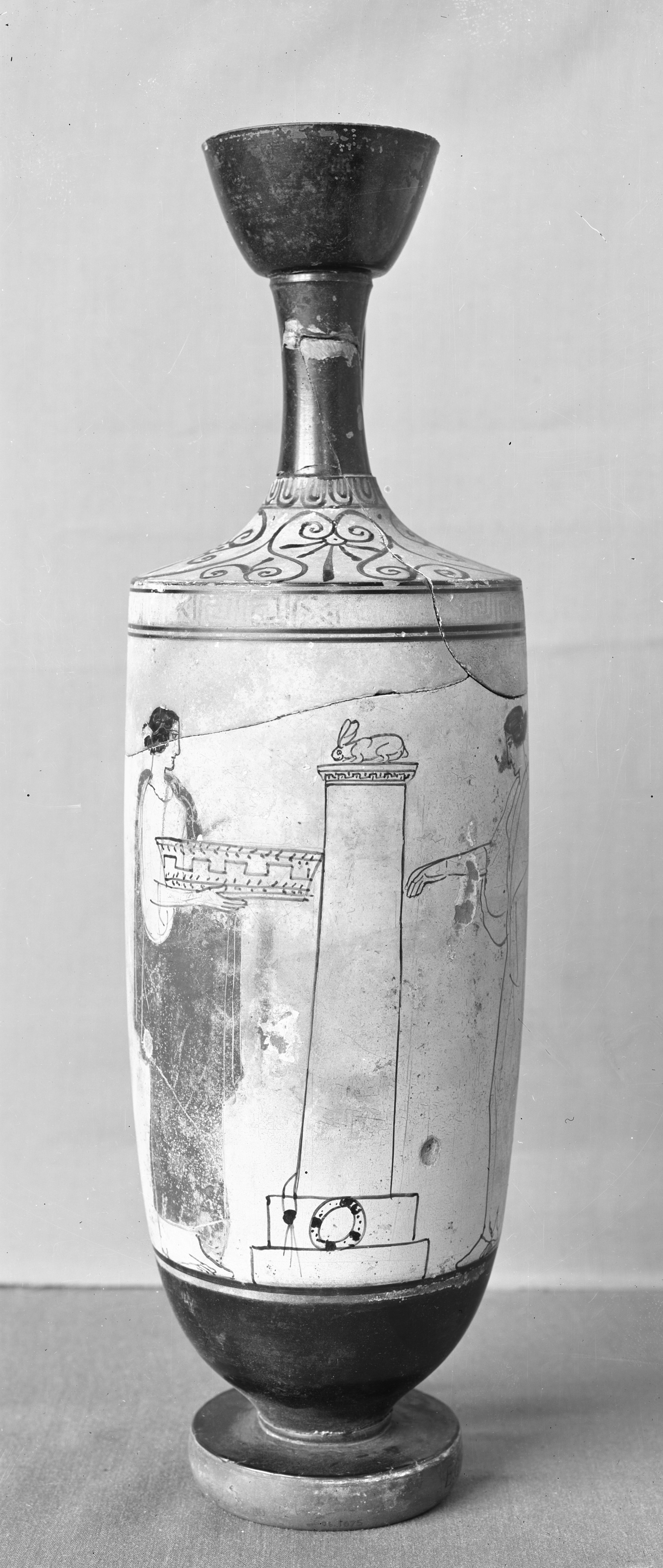
Lekythos depicting a woman visiting a stele grave and carrying an offering for the gods. Note the wreath decoration.

The Grave Stele of Hegeso is one of the best-preserved surviving attic stele and features a woman seated by her servant. This grave is a naiskos, meaning Hegeso was likely a prominent woman as this style signified wealth and importance.

== Locations ==
Today, the Kerameikos grave monuments can be found at the Kerameikos Archaeological Museum, where many of them are preserved and kept on display.
