= Kerameikos Archaeological Museum =

Coordinates: 37.9780°N 23.7168°E

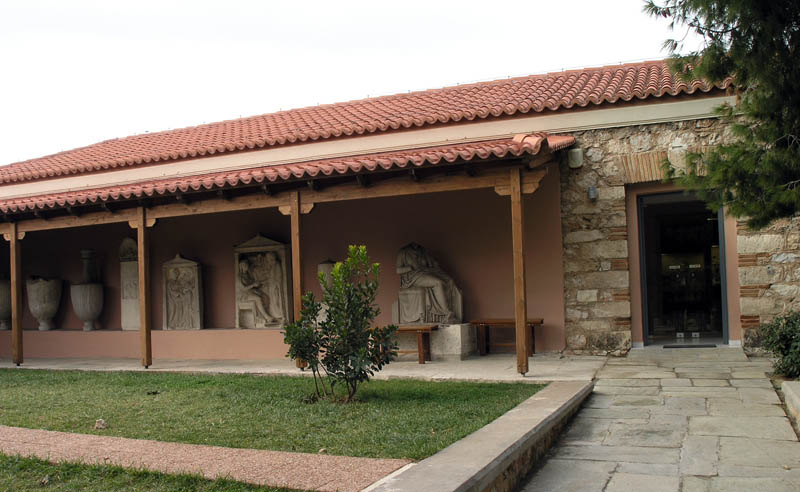
- Location: Athens, Greece
- Type: Archaeology museum

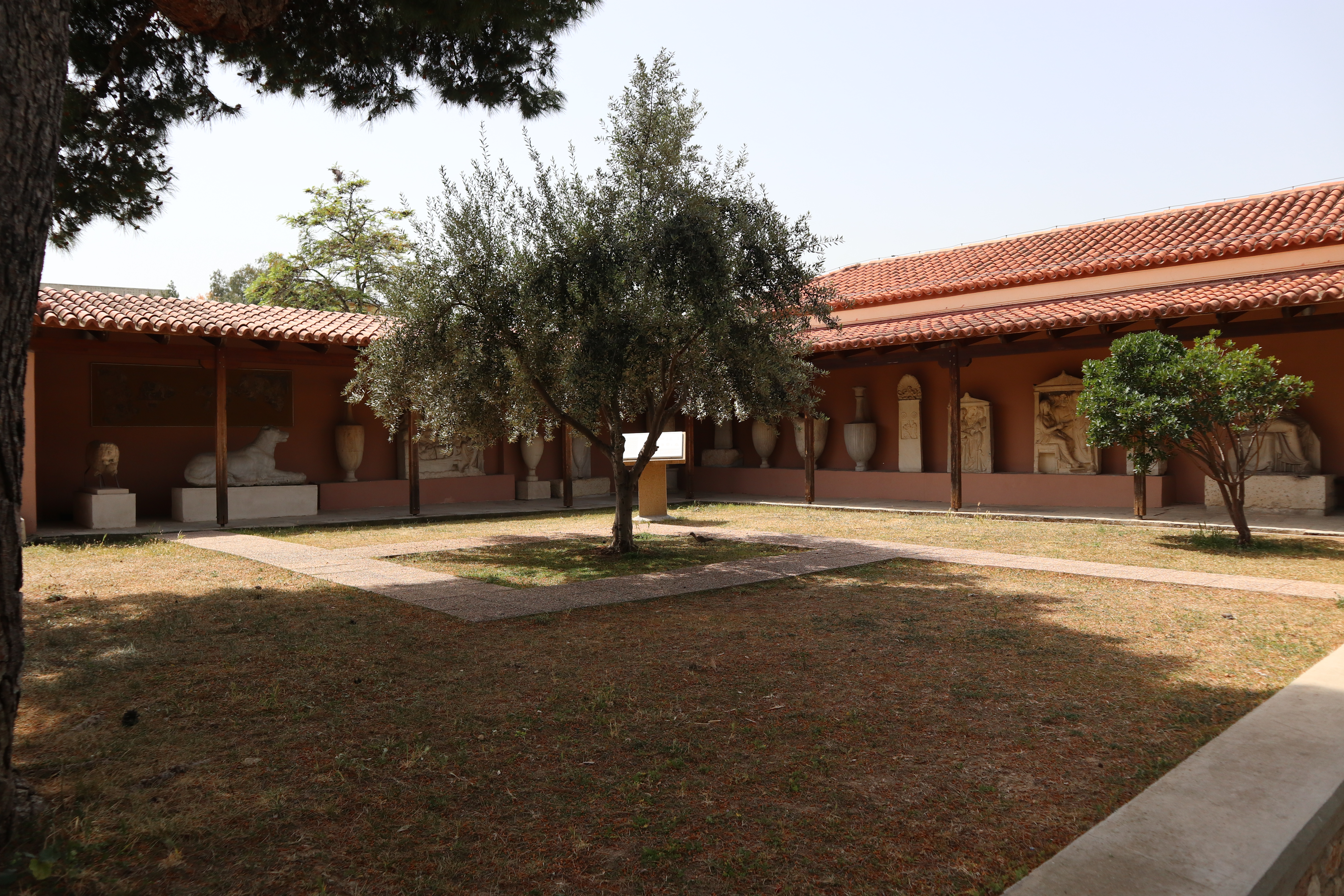
Portico at Kerameikos Archaeological Museum

The Kerameikos Archaeological Museum (Greek: Αρχαιολογικό Μουσείο Κεραμεικού, romanized: Archaiologikó Mouseío Kerameikoú) is located in Kerameikos, Athens, Greece and was built in 1937. It houses many important early Geometric art pieces that date as far back as 860 BC. It was expanded in the 1960s by the Boehringer brothers of Boehringer Ingelheim fame. Its official address is Ermou, Athens 125, Greece.

== History ==
In 1863, archaeologists first started housing pottery and other artifacts found in the dig site in a small, makeshift outpost. It was an exhibit for the larger German Archaeological Institute until the official Museum was built in 1937, by H. Johannes. It was funded by Gustav Oberlander, a Prussian entrepreneur. The museum is housed directly in the area of Kerameikos among the famous archaeological site. The Boehringer brothers funded the expansion of the museum. It is a small, open-air museum with only four rooms on a single floor, but it houses many important funerary works as well as larger sculptures. Inside of the museum there is a garden area with olive trees and laurels.

== Exhibits ==
Three of the rooms house artifacts found in the Kerameikos necropolis, the other room houses sculptures found from all archaeological eras. Many of the artifacts found in Kerameikos are funerary or otherwise death-related and reflect the Athenian attitudes towards the afterlife. As such, many of the sculptures exhibited here are urns, lekythoi, grave reliefs, stelae, in addition to jewelry, etc. Some of the most notable findings are from the offerings to plague victims of the Plague of Athens. There are works from the Archaic, Classical, Hellenistic, and Roman periods. A black-figure lekythos was stolen from the archaeological museum in 1982.

== Gallery ==
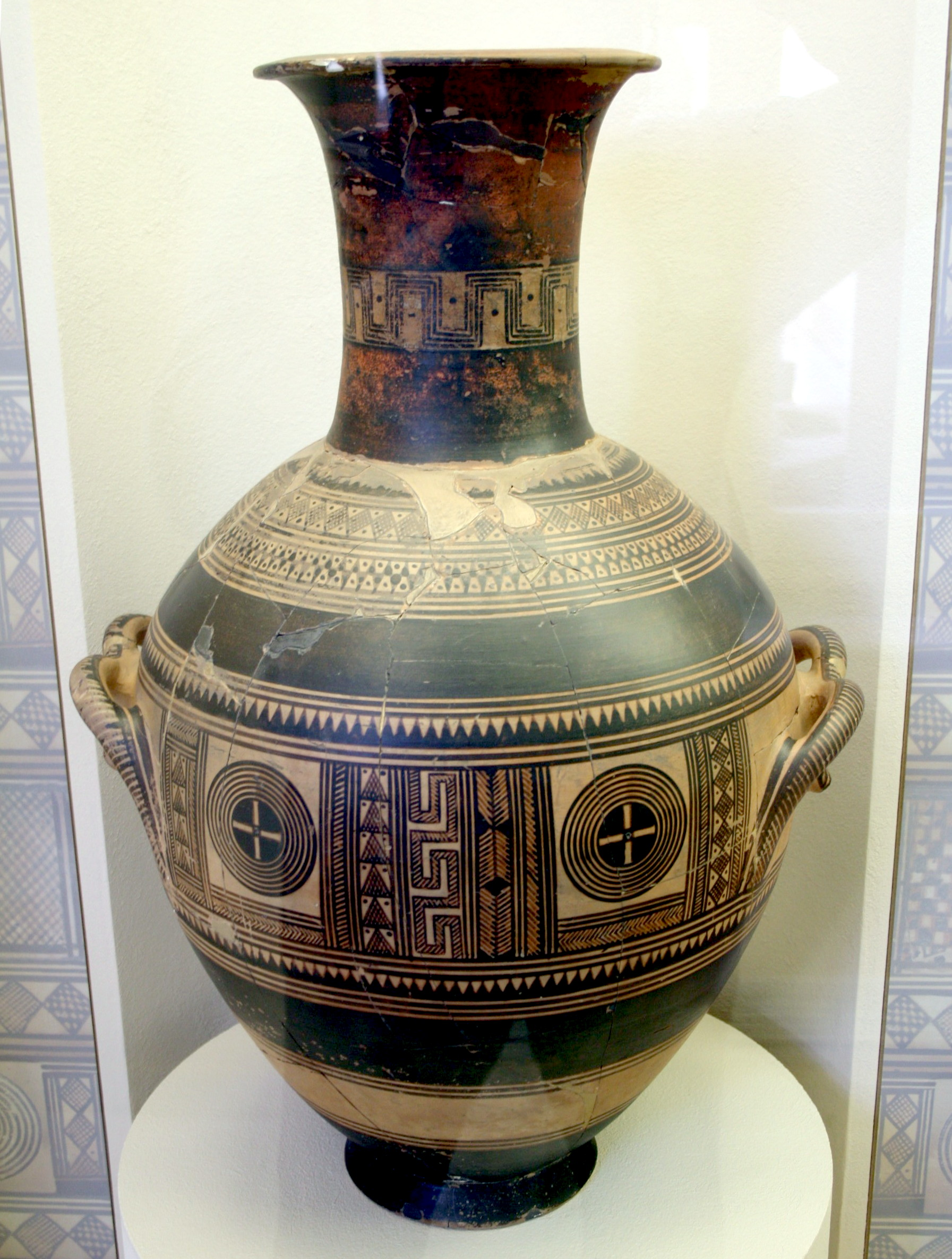
10th century BC cinerary urn amphora

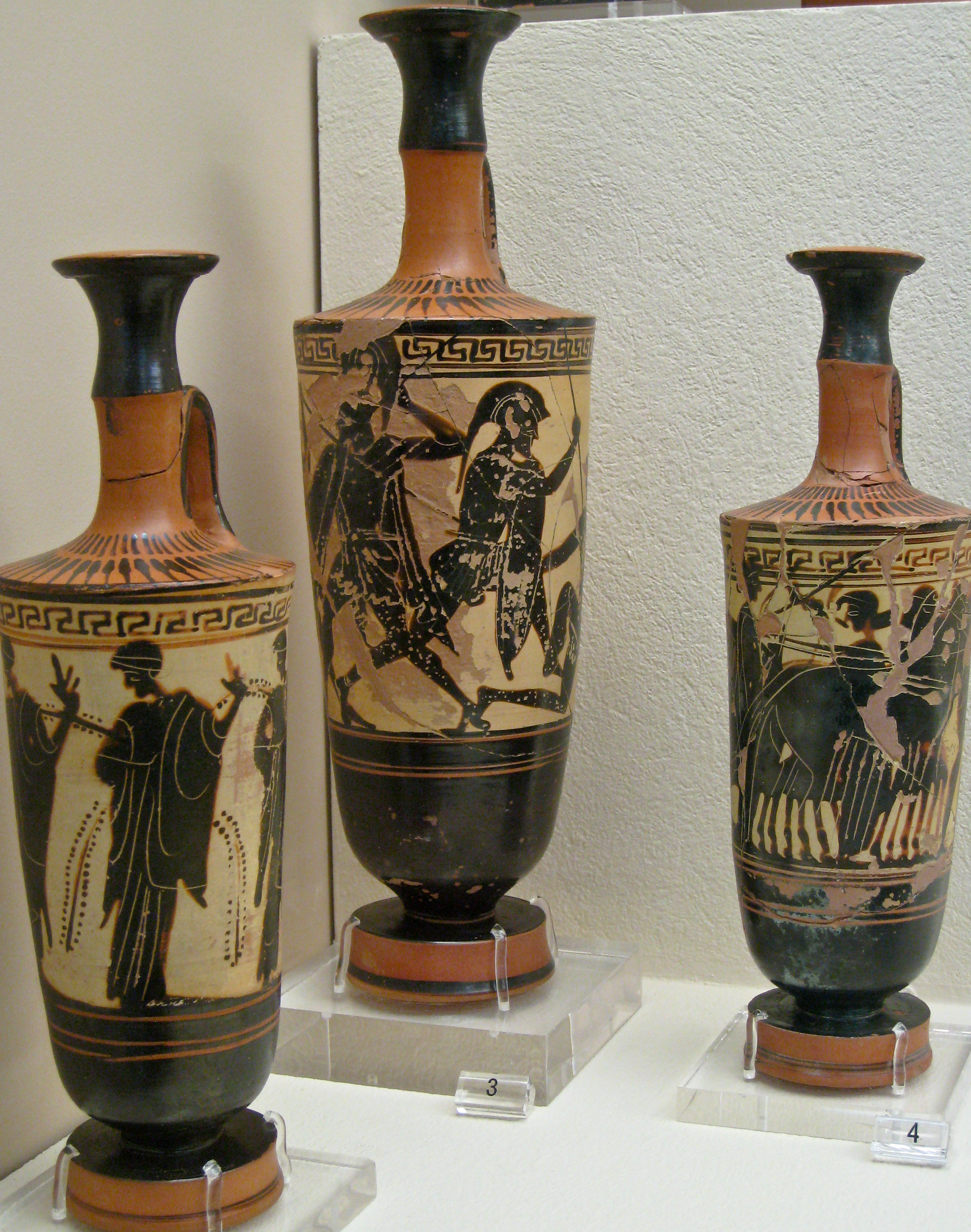
Black-figure white-ground lekythoi

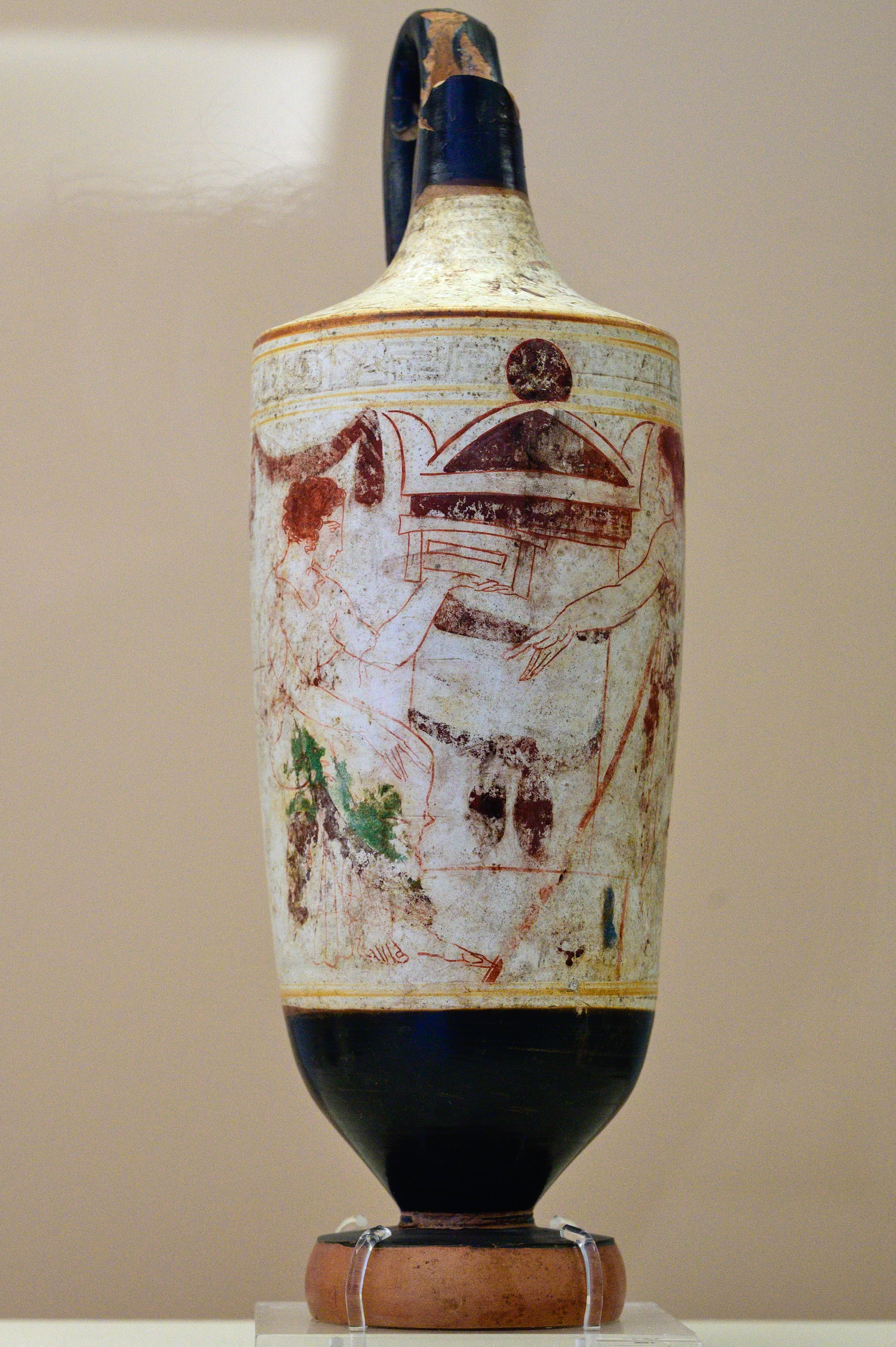
White-ground Lekythos, c. 420 BC

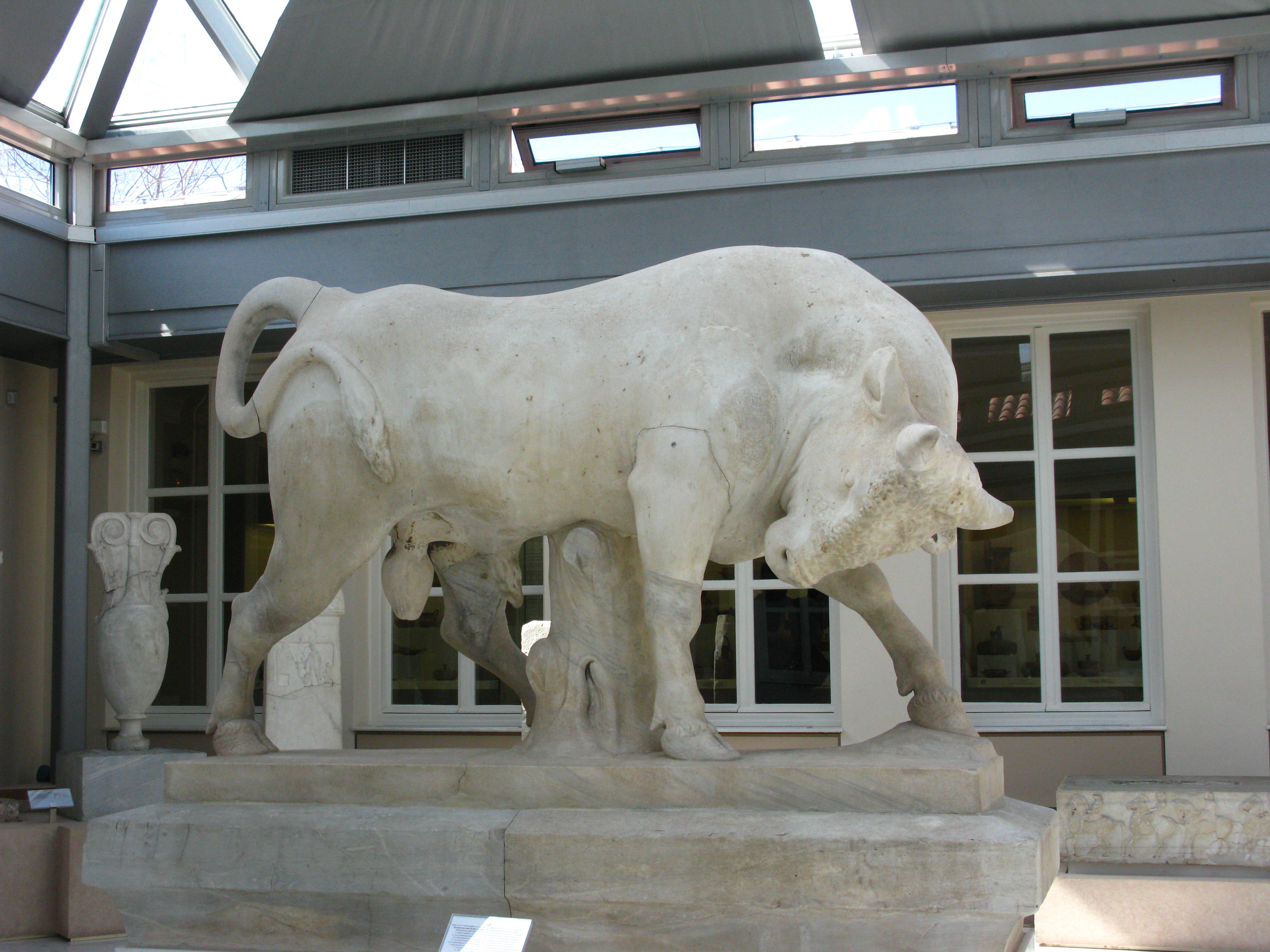
Dionysios of Kollitos bull, c. 345-340 BC

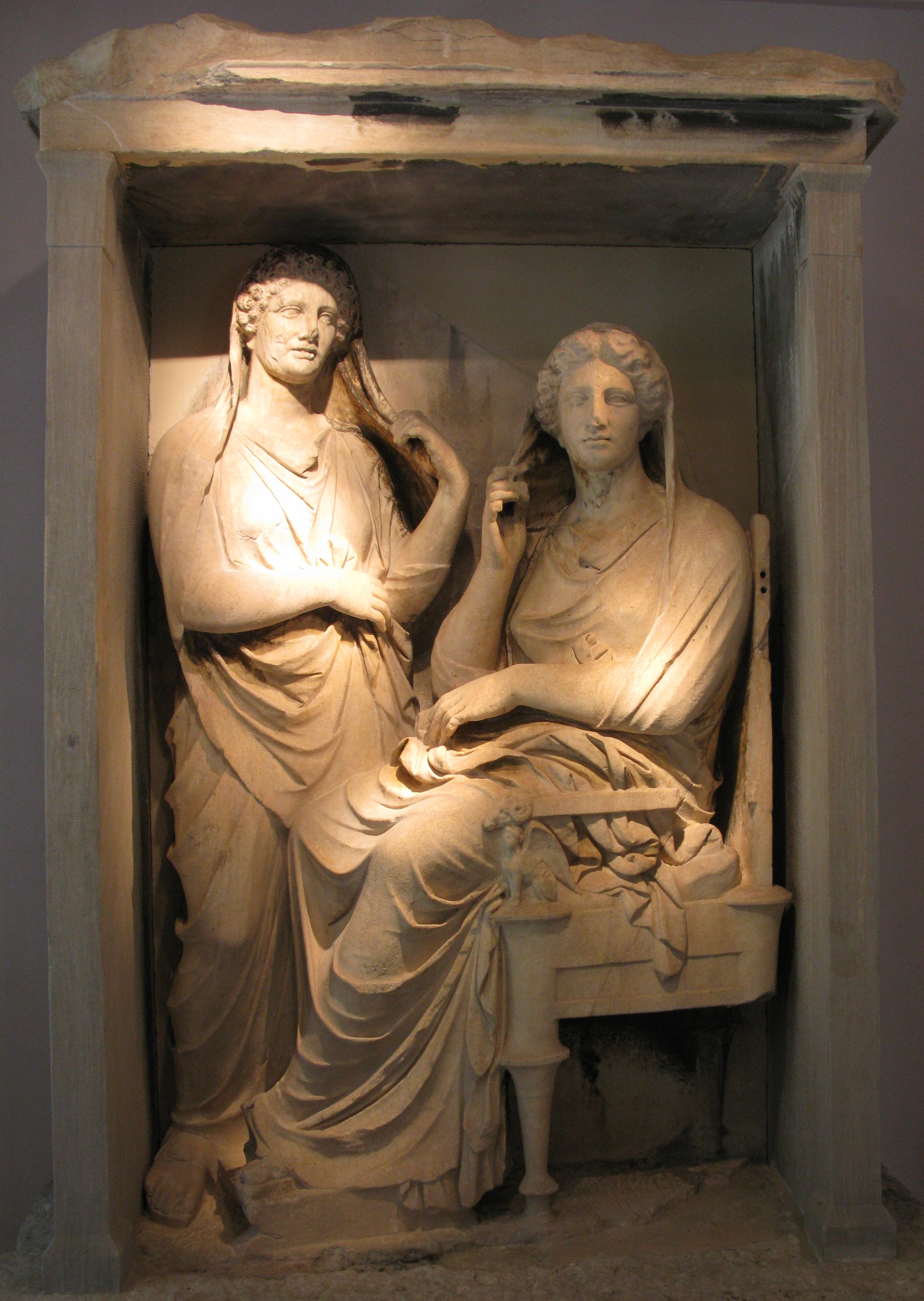
Funerary naiskos of Demetria and Pamphile, c. 325-310 BC

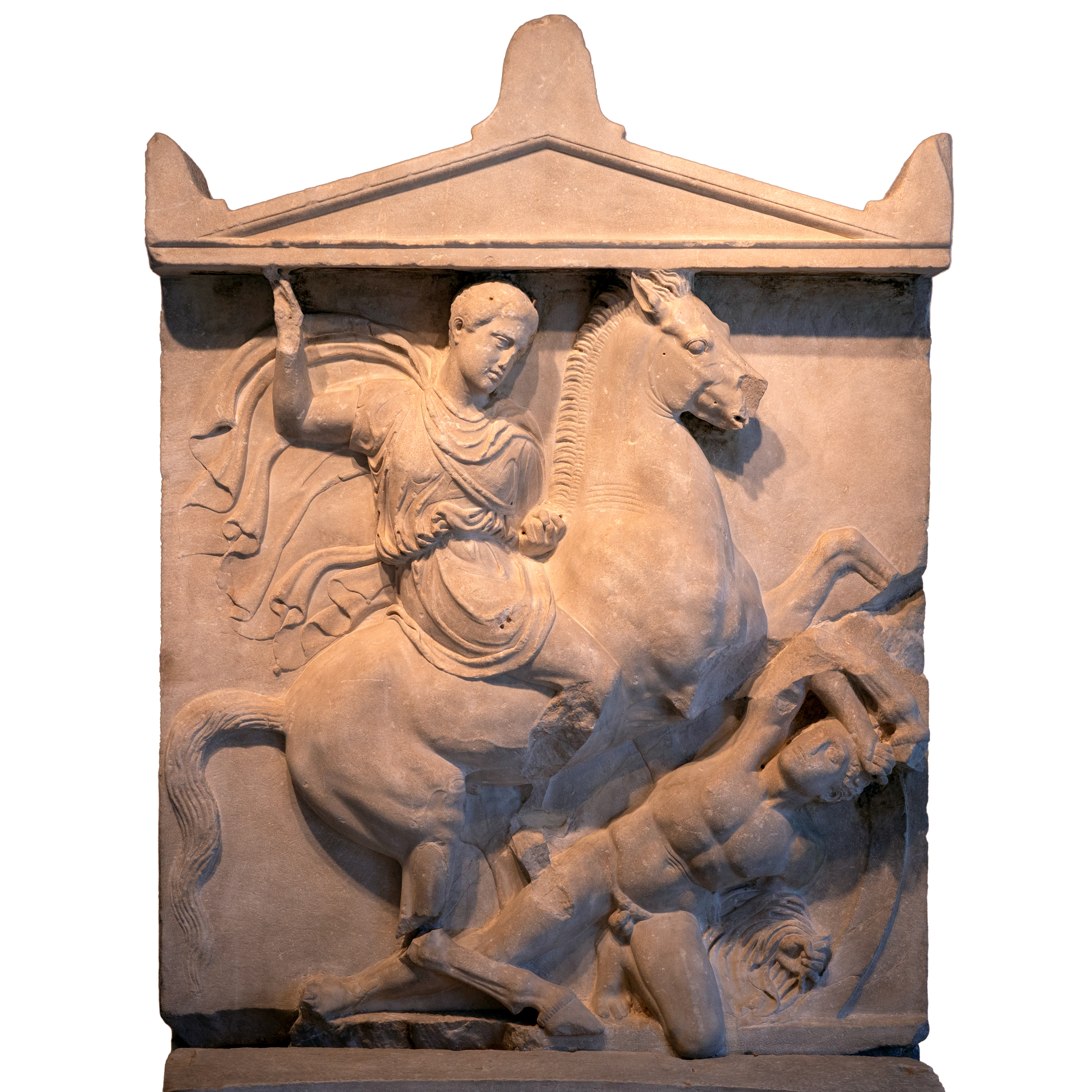
Grave Stele of Dexileos, son of Lysanias of Thorikos, c. 310 BC

== See also ==
- Boxer Stele Fragment from Kerameikos
- Kerameikos steles
