= Grave Stele of Dexileos =

Grave relief in Kerameikos of Athens

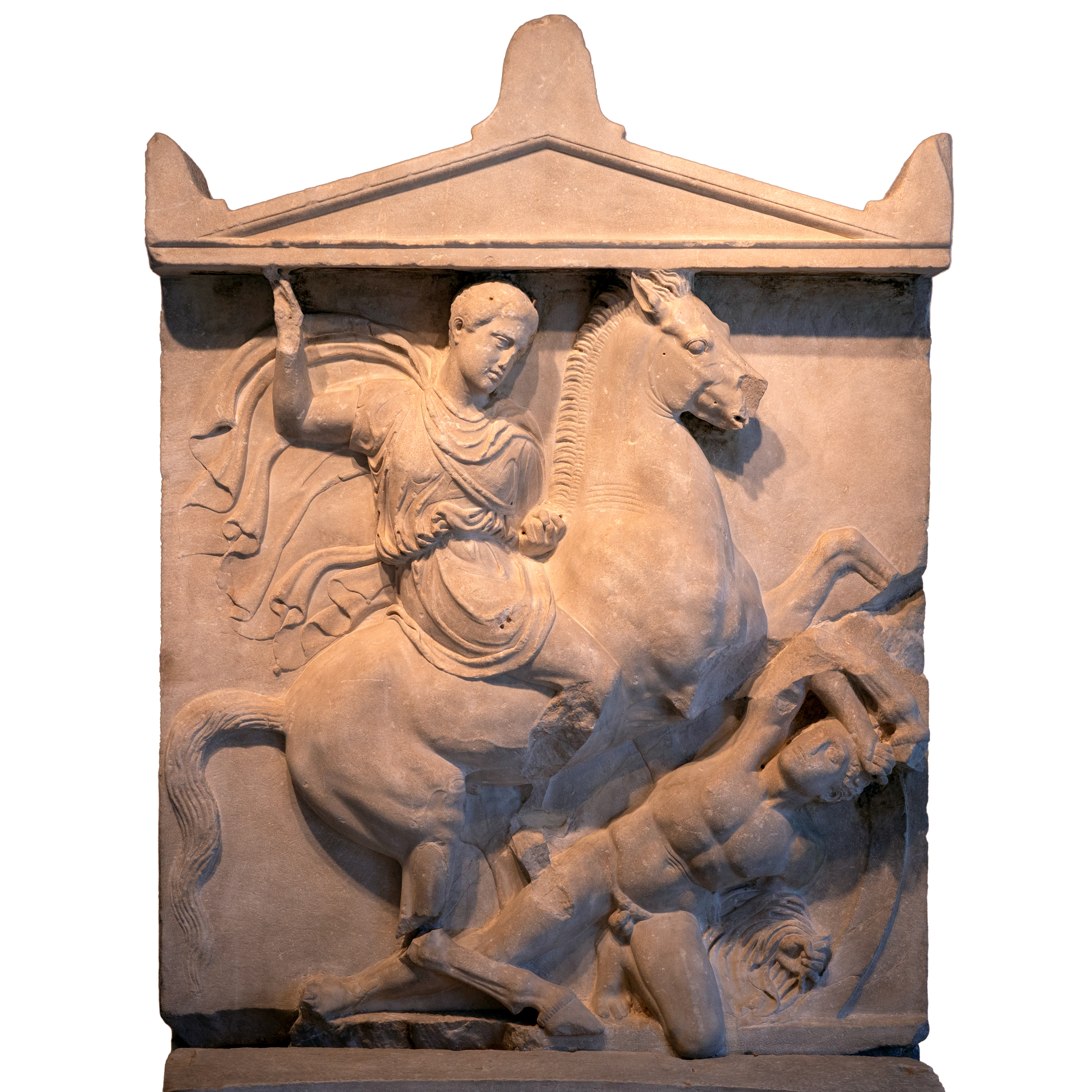
- Athenian cavalryman Dexileos fighting a naked Peloponnesian hoplite in the Corinthian War. Dexileos was killed in action near Corinth in the summer of 394 BC, probably in the Battle of Nemea, or in a proximate engagement. Grave Stele of Dexileos, 394–393 BC.
- Material: Pentelic marble
- Size: 1.86 metres (6 ft 1 in) tall
- Writing: Epitaph in Greek
- Created: Circa 394 BC
- Discovered: 1863
- Present location: Dipylon cemetery, Kerameikos, Athens, Greece

Location

The Grave Stele of Dexileos is the stele of the tomb of an Athenian cavalryman named Dexileos (Ancient Greek: Δεξίλεως) who died in the Corinthian War against Sparta in 394 BC. The stele is attributed to "The Dexileos Sculptor". Its creation can be dated to 394 BC, based on the inscription on its bottom, which provides the dates of birth and death of Dexileos. The stele is made out of an expensive variety of Pentelic marble and is 1.86 metres (6 ft 1 in) tall. It includes a high relief sculpture depicting a battle scene with an inscription below it. The stele was discovered in 1863 in the family plot of Dexileos at the Dipylon cemetery in the Kerameikos cemetery of Athens. It was found in situ, but moved during World War II, and is now on display in the Kerameikos Museum in Athens.

== Description ==
The stele is carved in high relief and depicts a cavalryman, Dexileos, mounted on a horse, charging a Spartan enemy, probably at the 394 BC Battle of Nemea during the Corinthian War, in which Athens was defeated by Sparta.

Dexileos is seen in his youthfulness, shown through the lack of a beard being present. He wears a chiton, chlamys, and petasos as well as krepides on his feet. His garments flow in the wind as his horse rears upwards. Dexileos raises one arm to hold a spear, which has since been lost from the sculpture as it was an attachment of a different material. His torso twists forward in the frontal position while his head is in ¾ position, slanted with his gaze down towards his foe. The spear, reins, and petasos, which is a wide brimmed hat usually worn by Athenian ephebes, are all missing from the stele. Remnants of their presence are marked by stains and dowel holes in the relief where they would have been attached.

Below the horse is Dexileos’s enemy, who has fallen in battle and is shielding himself from the horse with one arm covering his head. The Greek enemy is seen in the frontal position with his head up towards Dexileos. The enemy is also depicted completely nude, representing his vulnerability as well as his worthiness as an opponent.

The inscription below the relief says:

Dexileos son of Lysanias of Thorikos.

He was born in the archonship of Teisandros (i.e. year 414/3);
he died in that of Euboulides (i.e. year 394/3),

at Corinth, one of the five cavalrymen.

— Epitaph of Dexileos, cavalryman killed in Corinthian war (394 BC)

This not only gives an exact date of Dexileos’s lifespan but also describes his death in battle at Corinth. The entire stele relief scene is bordered on top with a pediment adorned with acroteria, which gives it a religious aspect with reference to naiskos, a small temple in the classical order.

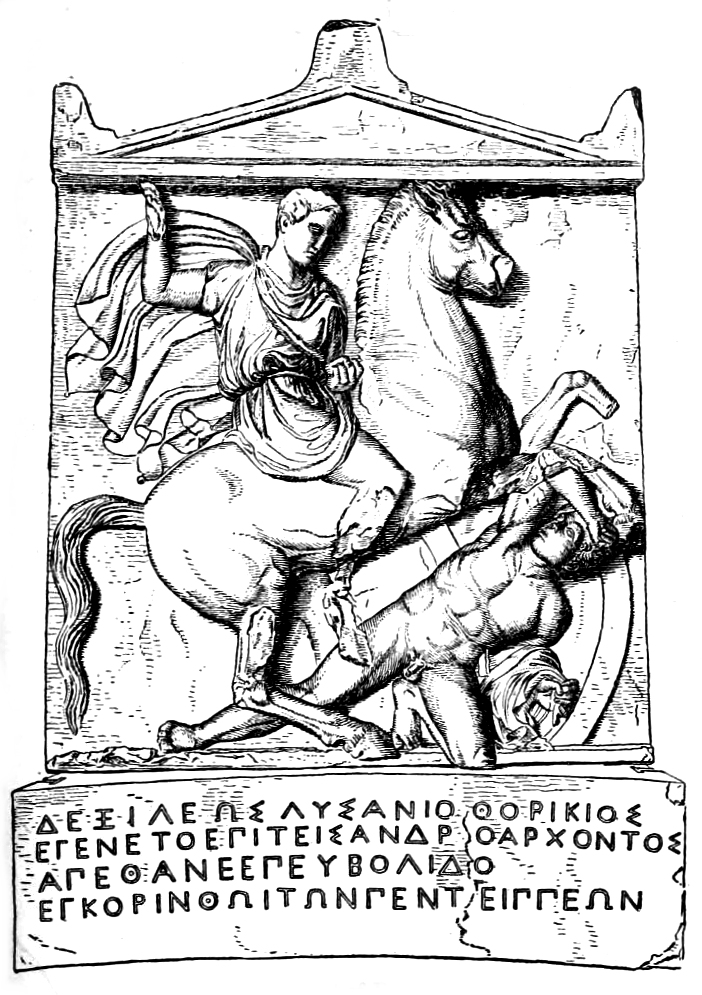
Dexileos Stele with inscription (drawing)

== Context ==
The Dexileos stele reflects Athens during a time of chaos and disorder. Following the Athenian loss of the Peloponnesian War in 404 BC, Athenian democracy was finally restored in 403 after the overthrow of the Thirty Tyrants. Athens was also facing a war with Sparta at this time, the Corinthian War. Dexileos was a young cavalryman who died at the age of twenty, which can be seen through the inscription that reveals his lifespan. Dexileos would have been an ephebe, going through his rite of passage to become a full, democratic citizen, like other Athenian men. This process included serving in the military for three years. This stele shares characteristics of two distinct ideologies in the classical period relating to death in battle; One being a very individualistic depiction glorifying the deceased and the other being an inclusion of aristocracy within Athenian democracy and depicting death as a sacrifice for the state. While this monument depicts wealthy Dexileos in triumph, bringing pride to his family, it also shows how he is part of the Athenian community, making a sacrifice of life for his people.

Dexileos belonged to the class of knights. Four other knights, along with Antiphates, the leader of Dexileos's tribe, were also killed in 394 BC. The ashes of Dexileos as well as those of the four other knights were transferred to Athens and deposited at the Public Cemetery. The relief that was discovered in the Kerameikos was constructed later by the relatives of Dexileos (dated to 390 BC), when the family enclosure was built, where the relief was found.

== Location ==
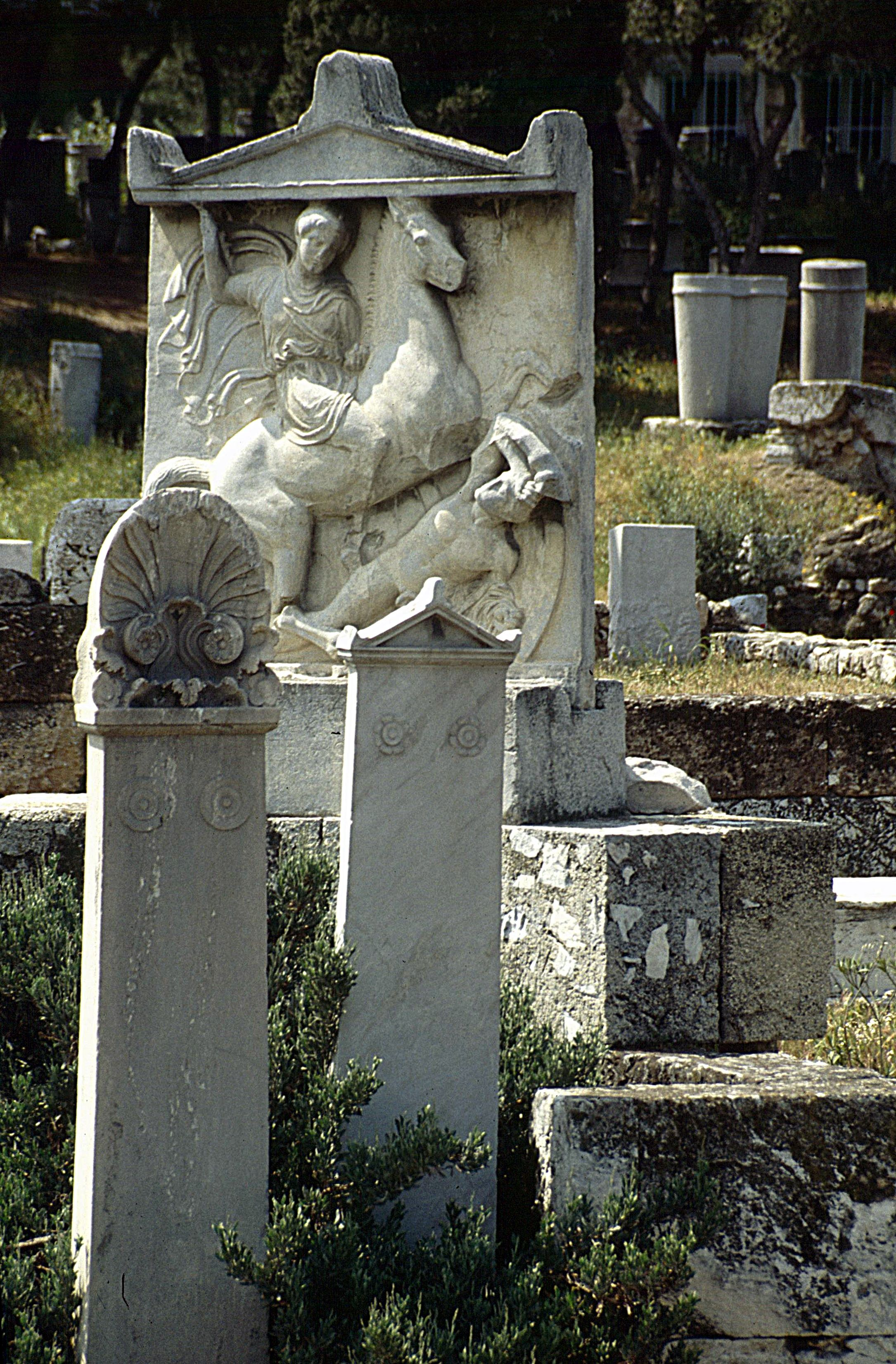
Copy of the stele in the Dipylon Cemetery, the original now being in the Kerameikos Museum.

The Dexileos stele is one of three monuments in the Dipylon cemetery honoring Athenian warriors. One other monument, the Polyandron, honors all those soldiers who died for the city within a certain year, including Dexileos. All these soldiers' remains, including those of the elite cavalry status as well as less-wealthy foot soldiers, were mixed together, burned, and placed in the Demosion Sema for burial. This ritual equated all Athenians after death to create a complete, whole democracy. The other monument honored all fallen cavalrymen, listing eleven, including Dexileos, in total. This monument preserved the sacrifices of those cavalrymen to democracy.

== Funerary crown ==
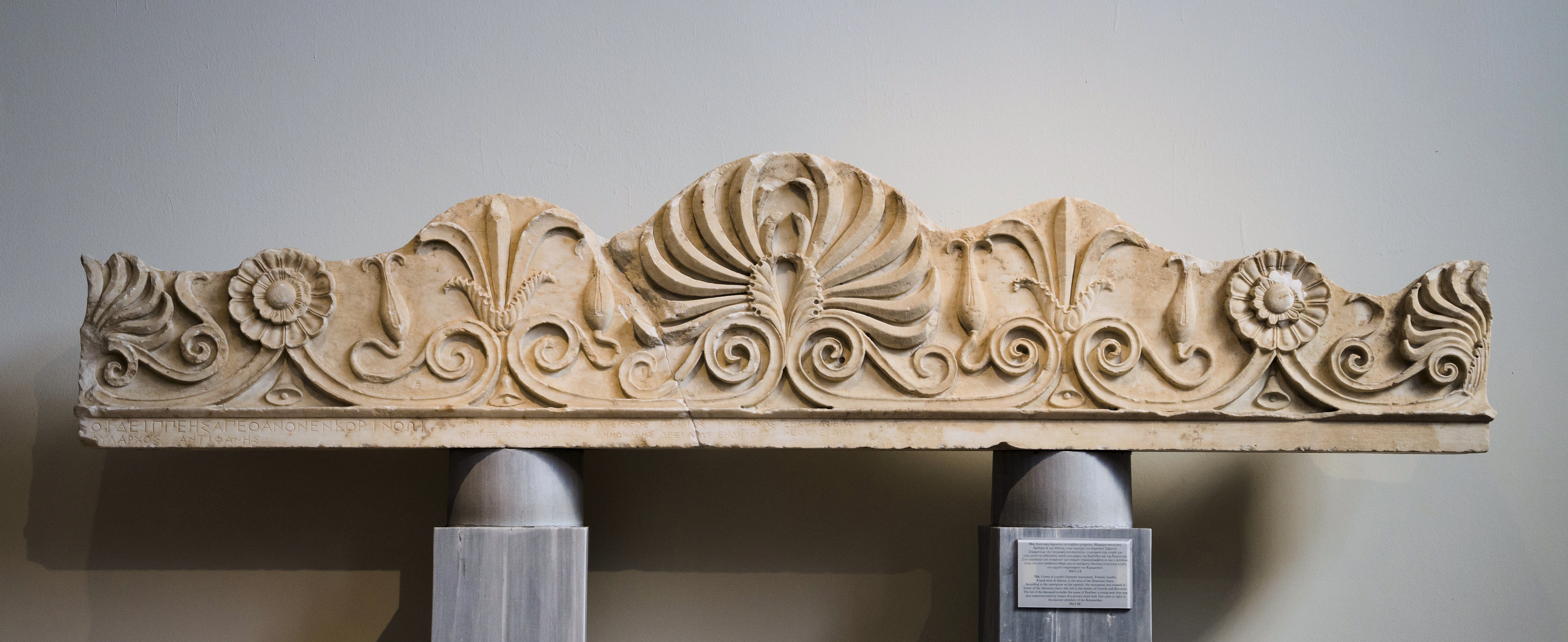
Funerary crown with the name of Dexileos on the base. 394/3 BC. Athens National Archaeological Museum, Nb.754

Another monument was discovered, dedicated to five Athenian cavalrymen including Dexileos. Only the crown of the public funerary monument remains, now in Athens National Archaeological Museum. The monument, in pentelic marble, was found west of Athens, in the area of the Demosion Sema. According to the inscription on the epistyle, the monument was erected in honour of the Athenian riders who fell in the battles of Corinth and Coronea in 394 BC. The list of the fallen includes the name of Dexileos.

== Discovery ==
The stele was discovered by the Athenian archaeologist, art dealer and antiquities trafficker Athanasios Rhousopoulos in the spring of 1863. Rhousopoulos' excavation followed the earlier discovery on 1 January 1862 [O.S. 20 December 1861] of the funerary naiskos of Aristonautes. Along with the nearby excavation of the funerary enclosure of Agathon, the discovery of Dexileios's stele confirmed the location of the Kerameikos cemetery, which had been forgotten since antiquity.

== See also ==
- Kerameikos steles
- Dimitris Mytaras's Dexileos in Dafni metro station.
- Thracian horseman
- Funerary Stela of Demokleides - belonging to a hoplite who died, like Dexileios, in the Corinthian War.
