= Funerary naiskos of Demetria and Pamphile =

Ancient Greek grave relief from Kerameikos

- Ναΐσκος Δημητρίας και Παμφίλης (Greek)
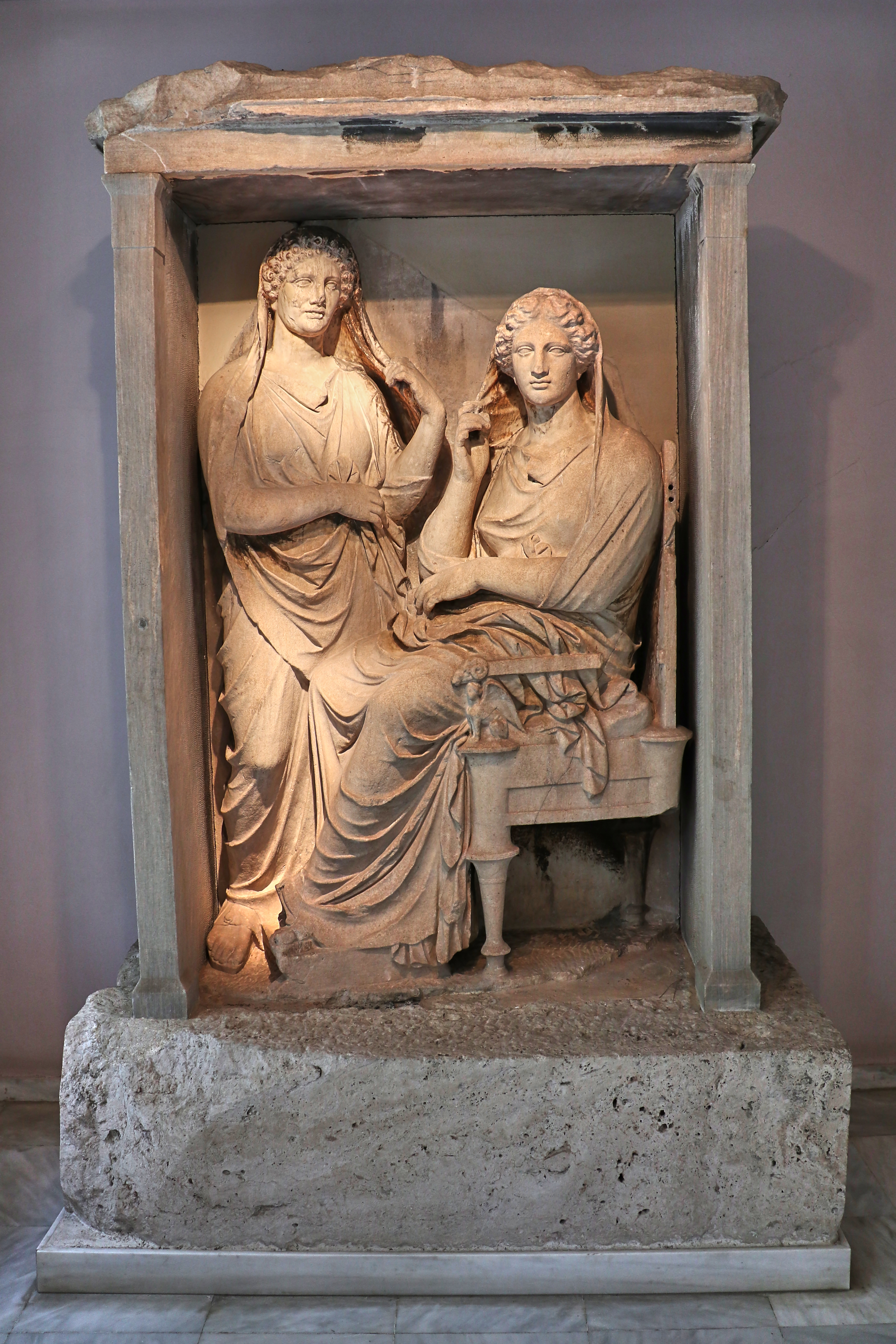
- The stele in the KAMA in June 2018
- Year: c. 320 BC
- Catalogue: No P687
- Medium: Marble
- Movement: Classical
- Subject: Demetria and Pamphile
- Condition: Intact (chair leg missing)
- Location: Kerameikos Archaeological Museum; Athens

The Funerary naiskos of Demetria and Pamphile (Greek: Επιτύμβιος ναΐσκος Δημητρίας και Παμφίλης) is an ancient Greek tomb memorial (naiskos) in honour of two deceased women named Demetria and Pamphile, erected in classical Athens around 320 BC, shortly after Pamphile's death, and one of the most notable discoveries in Kerameikos. The naiskos was discovered during excavations in the late nineteenth century.

It is one of the last decorated funerary monuments that were placed in the ancient Kerameikos cemetery before the prohibition of decorated tombs in the late fourth century BC. The sculpture is made of white marble and carved in very high relief. It is now kept at the Kerameikos Archaeological Museum in Athens, Greece, with inventory number P687. A modern plaster cast copy of it is found on the ancient site of the tomb in the cemetery next to the museum.

== History ==
=== Creation ===
The grave naiskos (meaning "small temple") is one of last tombstone steles erected in Kerameikos, the cemetery of classical Athens, before the issuance of the prohibitory decree by the then-governor Demetrius of Phalerum in 317 BC regarding the adornation of tombs; this naiskos dates back to around 317–320 BC. The relief bears the inscription "Demetria and Pamphile", the names of the two women depicted. This is the second funerary stele that was made for this family, as an earlier one has also been discovered, which was produced for Demetria when she died, some twenty to thirty years before Pamphile.

=== Discovery ===
The naiskos was discovered in 1870 at the western end of the south road, and remained in situ for over a century until its eventual removal around April 2003, whereupon it was transferred to the Archaeological Museum of Kerameikos in order to protect it from corrosion and natural wear due to exposure. A plaster cast of it was put in its place instead. Its inventory number in the museum is P687.

== Description ==
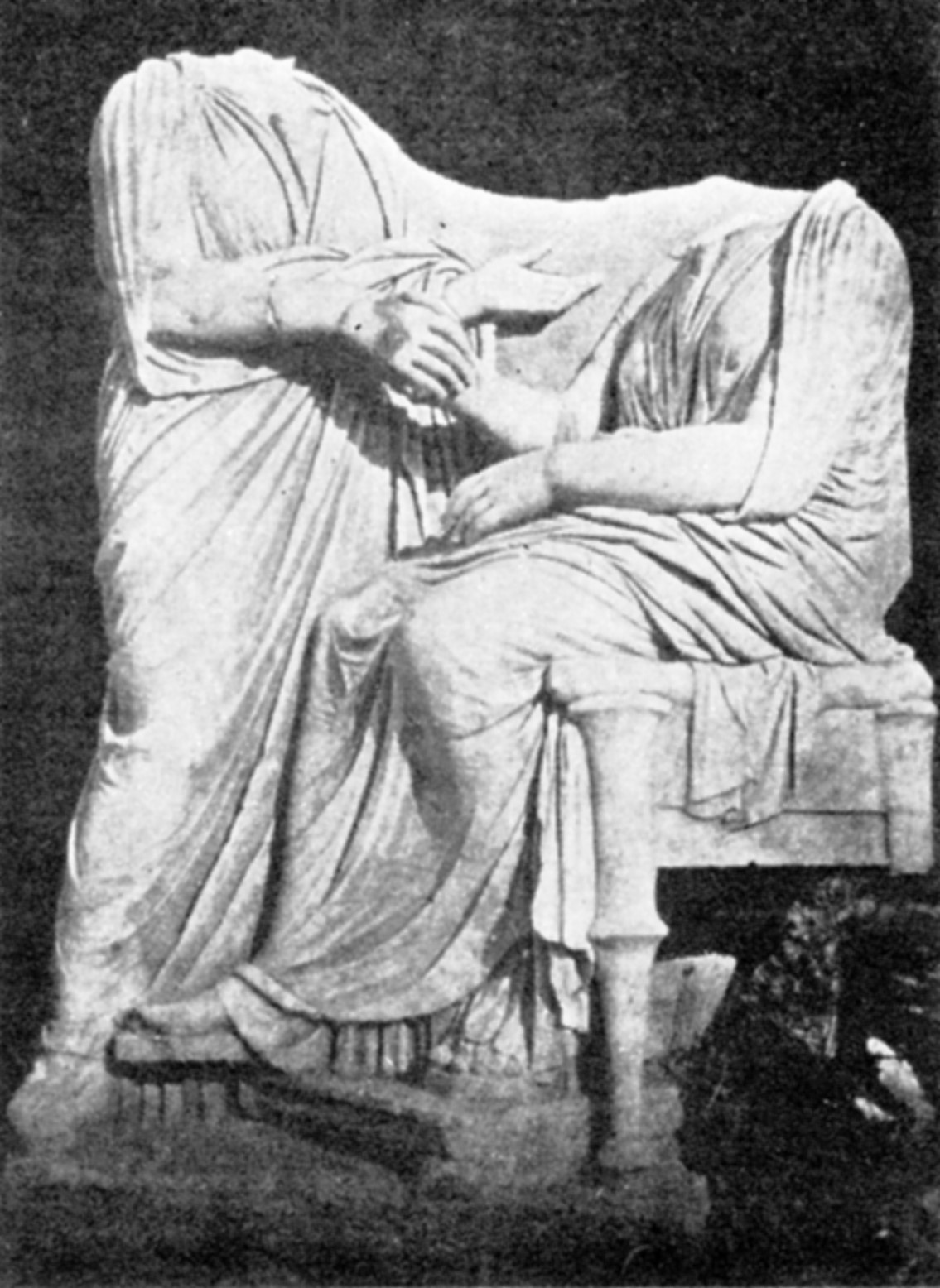
The older naiskos belonging to Demetria.

The grave relief was made of white marble, and it is a typical example of the evolution of the naiskoi during the fourth century BC, as over time they became sunken into the relief, and the figures were carved in high relief, almost entirely detached from the surface.

By the fourth century BC, women had more prominent role in grave relief imagery, and occasionally would appear singly without men. The naiskos shows two grown up women, one sitting on a luxurious chair, while the other stands still beside her. The sitting woman is the recently deceased one, Pamphile, while the standing one is her sister Demetria, who had long predeceased her. Both women are dressed richly with long, folding chitons and himatia that cover their heads, and are starring blankly at the viewer now that they are both dead.

They both have one arm resting on their abdomens, while with the other hand they hold onto their himatia that cover their heads. Their clothes form elegant folds on their bodies, particularly visible with Pamphile's left leg, which is slightly stretched. Both Pamphile and Demetria have their hair done in elaborate tresses according to the Athenian customs and fashion of the era. The armrest of the chair Pamphile sits on ends in a ram's head, supported by a siren; deceased women sitting on "unusually" elaborately elaborated thrones was not uncommon in contemporary Attic tomb reliefs.

=== The older stele ===
The tomb of the two women contains a second stele as well, made for Demetria who predeceased her sister at least two decades prior. In Demetria's stele it is Demetria who is sitting on the chair, while the living Pamphile stands next to her. The two sisters are tenderly holding hands (a gesture and sculptural theme known as dexiosis, common in funerary monuments), symbolizing the deceased woman's departure as she bids farewell to her living sister. This element is not present in the newer naiskos, as both sisters are now dead, and neither has to say goodbye to the other. The heads of the older naiskos, which is now kept in the National Archaeological Museum of Athens, are not preserved, having been broken off long ago.

Demetria's stele incorporates the theme of the inclusion of a living relative with the commemorated dead person, a practice which often makes it hard to distinguish the dead from the living due to the lack of related inscriptions or appropriate iconography.

== See also ==
- Grave Stele of Dexileos
- Great Eleusinian Relief
- Grave Stele of Hegeso

== Bibliography ==
- Banou, Eleni S. (2014). Kerameikos (PDF). Athens, Greece: John S. Latsis foundation. ISBN 978-960-98364-8-7.
- Closterman, Wendy E. (2007). "Family Ideology and Family History: The Function of Funerary Markers in Classical Attic Peribolos Tombs". American Journal of Archaeology. 111 (4): 633–52. JSTOR 40025266.
- Pilz, Oliver (2011). "The Uses of Small Things and the Semiotics of Greek Miniature Objects". Pallas (86): 15–30. JSTOR 43606683.
- Ridgway, Brunilde Sismondo (1987). "Ancient Greek Women and Art: The Material Evidence". American Journal of Archaeology. 91 (3): 399–409. JSTOR 505361.
