= Geometric art =

Phase of Greek art c. 900–700 BC

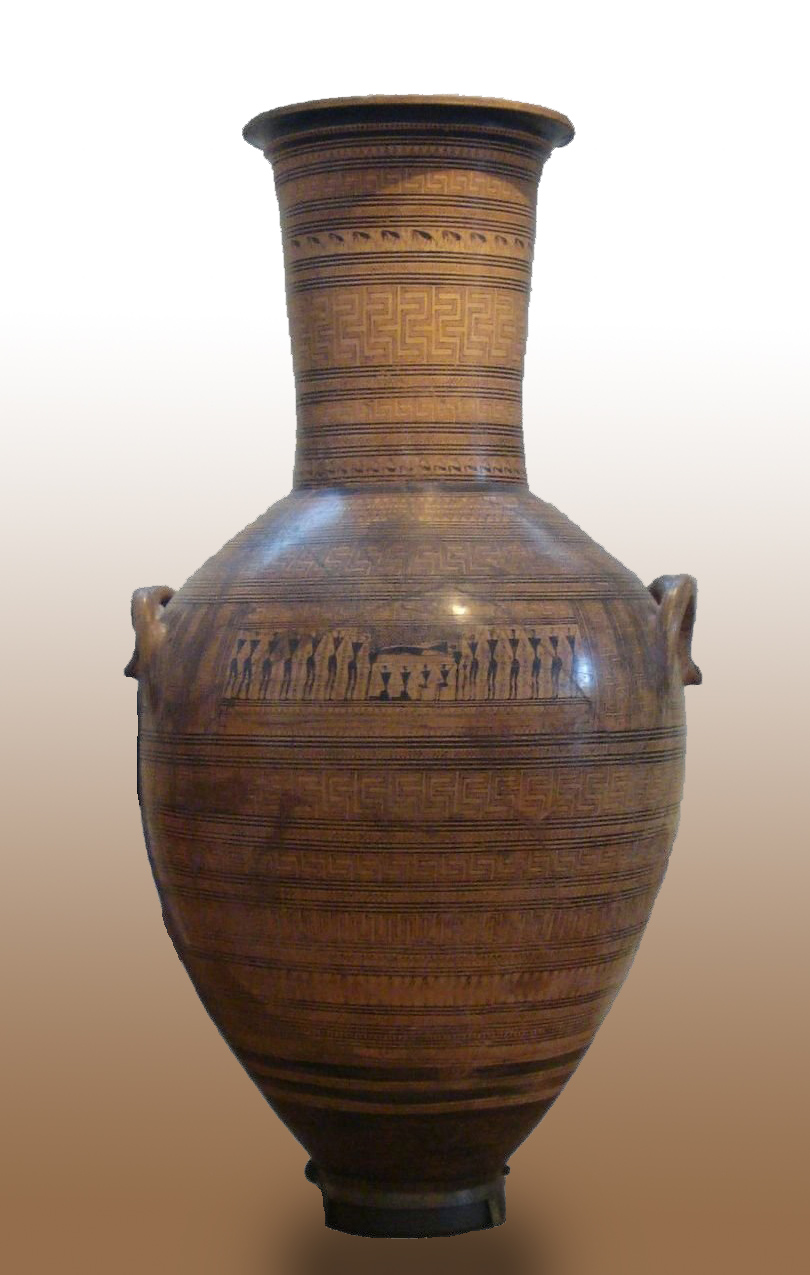
The Dipylon Amphora, mid-8th century BC, with human figures. National Archaeological Museum, Athens.

Geometric art is a style of Ancient Greek pottery which flourished c. 900–700 BC, characterized by vases painted with stylized geometric motifs. Its production was centered in Athens, whence the geometric style spread to the trading cities of the Aegean. Funerary and symposium vases are typical types of geometric pottery.

== Usage ==
=== Funerals ===
Large funerary vases (often Dipylon kraters for men, and belly-handled amphorae for women) not only depicted funerary scenes, but they also had practical purposes, either holding the ashes or being used as grave markers. These vases often carried funerary imagery to commemorate the dead; the deceased person was depicted robed lying in state (prothesis), often surrounded by mourning family members, or lying in a bed and carried to the grave with an honorary chariot procession (ekphora). The depiction was accompanied by various heroic scenes and warfare imagery which are thought to be related to similar descriptions of the Homeric epics and were used to enhance the heroic ambience. To the Greeks, an omission of a proper burial was an insult to proper dignity. The mythological context of a proper burial relates to the Greeks' belief in a continued existence in the underworld that will disallow the dead to maintain peace in the absence of a proper burial ritual.

=== Symposia ===
Aside from its funerary use, the Greeks also utilized various vessels during symposia. The Greek symposium was a social gathering that only aristocratic males were allowed to attend. Vessels, such as wine coolers, jugs, various drinking cups, and mixing vessels, were decorated with Greek, geometric scenes. Some of the scenes depicted drinking parties or Dionysus and his followers. The symposia were held in the andron, which was a men's-only room. The only women allowed into this room were called "hetaera", highly educated entertainers and conversationalists who required payment from their male companions. There is scholarly dispute about whether hetaerae also engaged in sex work.

== Periodization ==
=== Protogeometric period ===
The Protogeometric style (1025–900 BC) inherits its decorative forms and motifs from Mycenaean tradition and is mostly visible in ceramic production. Technological developments of the era created a new relationship between ornament and structure, causing differing stylistic choices from its Mycenaean influences. The shapes of the vessels have eliminated the fluid nature of the Mycenaean creating a more strict and simple design. There are horizontal, decorative bands that feature geometric shapes, including concentric circles or semicircles. Other characteristics of the early Protogeometric style included monochrome pottery and wavy lines on the shoulders. Common vase shapes of the period include amphorai with the handles on both the belly and the neck, hydriai (water jars), oinochoai (wine jugs), lekythoi, and skyphoi (stemless cups). Protegeometric pottery style is thought to have been led by Athens, while other regions also had their own local variations, most notably Thessaly, Euboea, Crete etc. The Protogeometric period did not yet feature human figures within its art, but horses were pictured during this time period. The village of Lefkandi in Euboea is considered one of the most representative sites of the Early Protogeometric style. New shapes, like the kalathos and pyxis, are thought to have been introduced during the Late Protogeometric period.

=== Early Geometric period ===
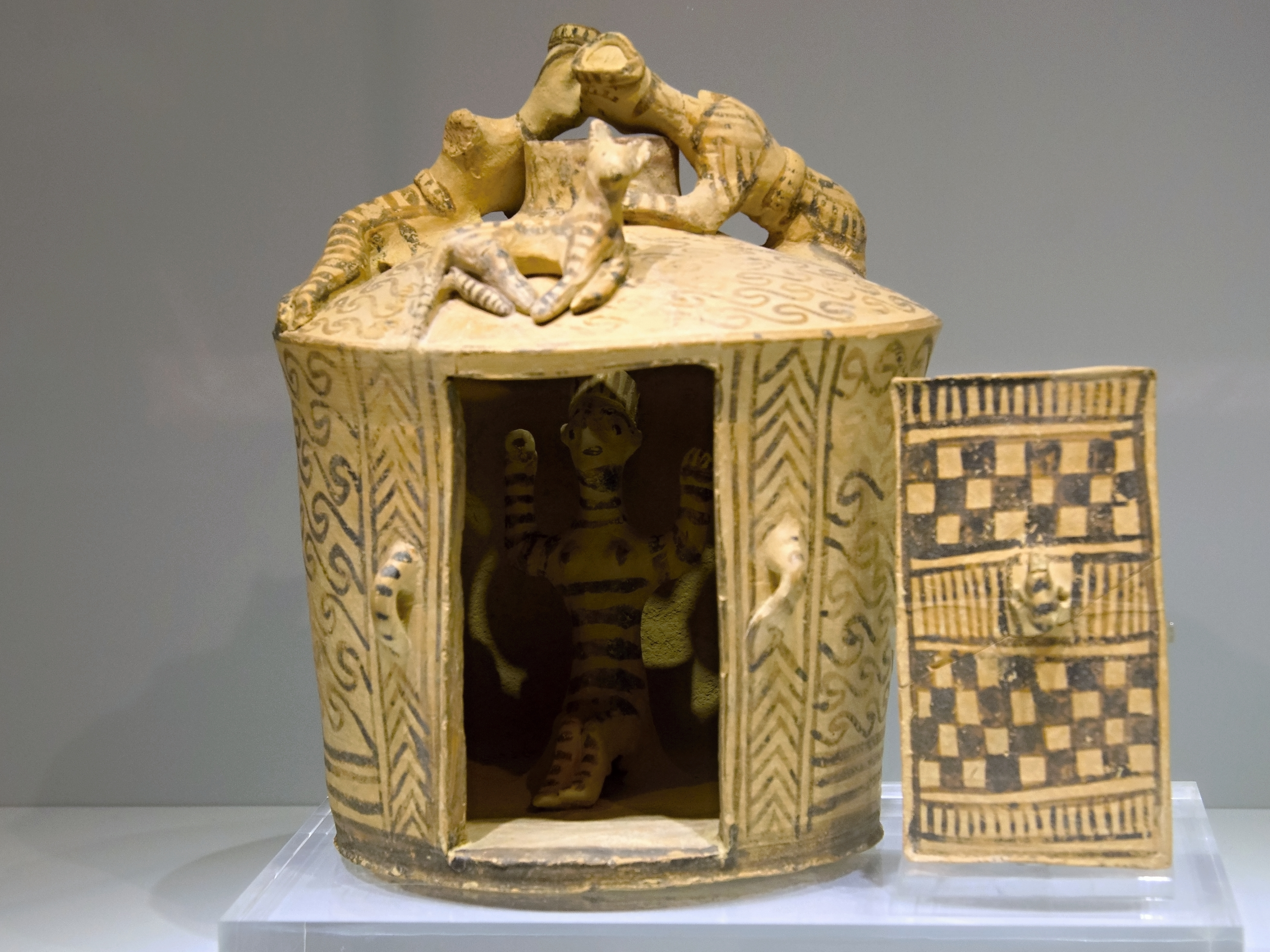
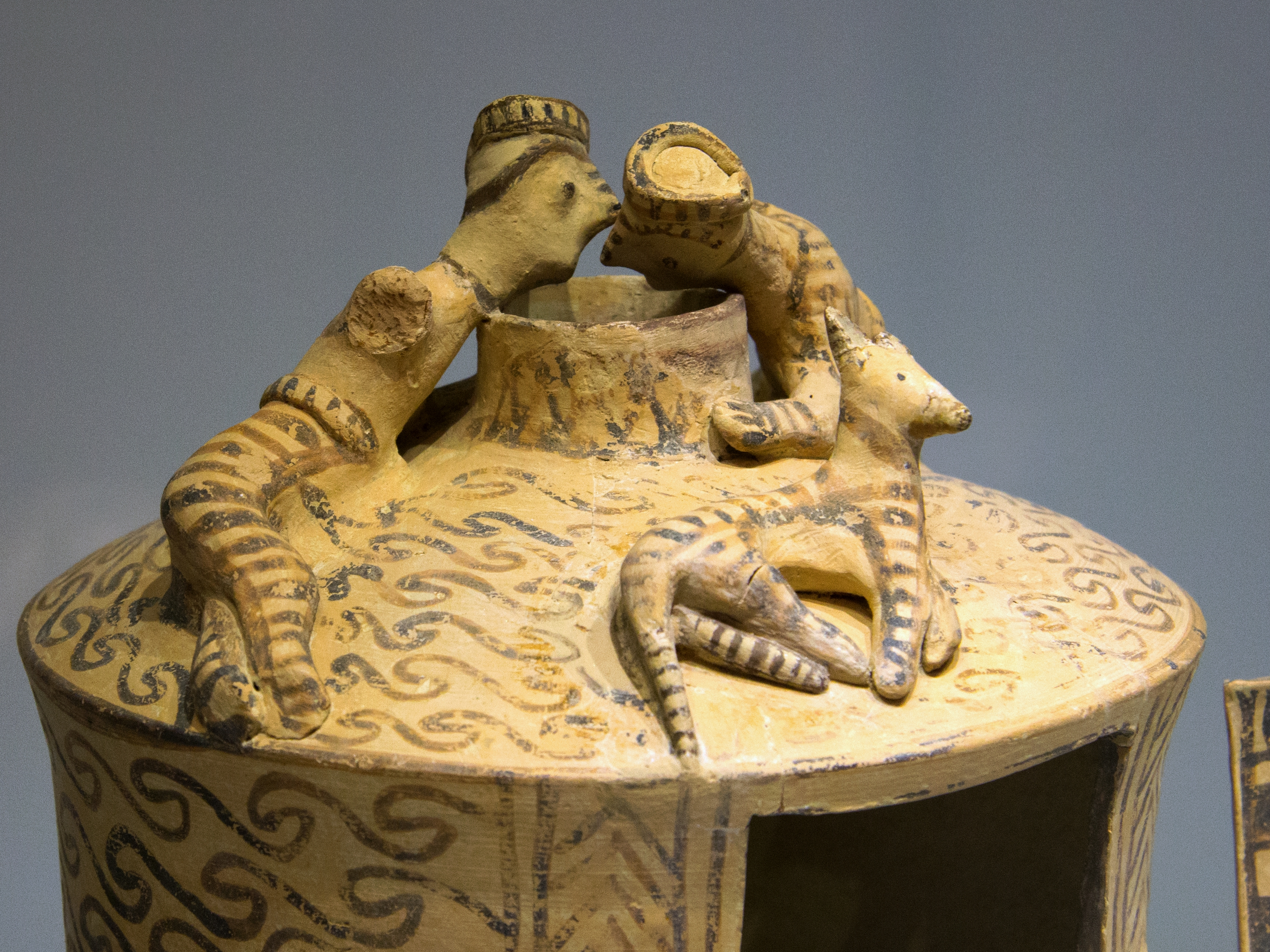
Circular shrine containing the figure of a goddess with upraised arms. Two prone figures, perhaps worshipers, observe the goddess through the opening in the roof, while an animal lies beside them. c. 850-800 BC, Archaeological Museum of Heraklion

In the early Geometric period (900–850 BC), the height of the vessels had been increased, while the decoration was limited around the neck down to the middle of the body of the vessel. The remaining surface is covered by a thin layer of clay, which during the firing takes a dark, shiny, metallic color. This was the period when the decorative theme of the meander was added to the pottery design, the most characteristic element of Geometric art.

During this period, a broader repertoire of vessel shapes was initiated. Specifically, amphorae were used to hold cremation ashes. The amphorae featured handles on the neck or shoulder for males, while featuring handles on the "belly" of the vase for women.

=== Middle Geometric period ===
By the middle Geometric period (850–760 BC), the decorative zones appear multiplied due to the creation of a laced mesh, while the meander dominates and is placed in the most important area, in the metope, which is arranged between the handles.

Based on excavations at Sindos, mentioned by Gimatzidis and Weninger (2020), Alagich et al. (2024) consider the possibility that Middle Geometric period began 140 years earlier, lasting (c. 990-870 BC).

==== Protogeometric to Middle Geometric artifacts ====
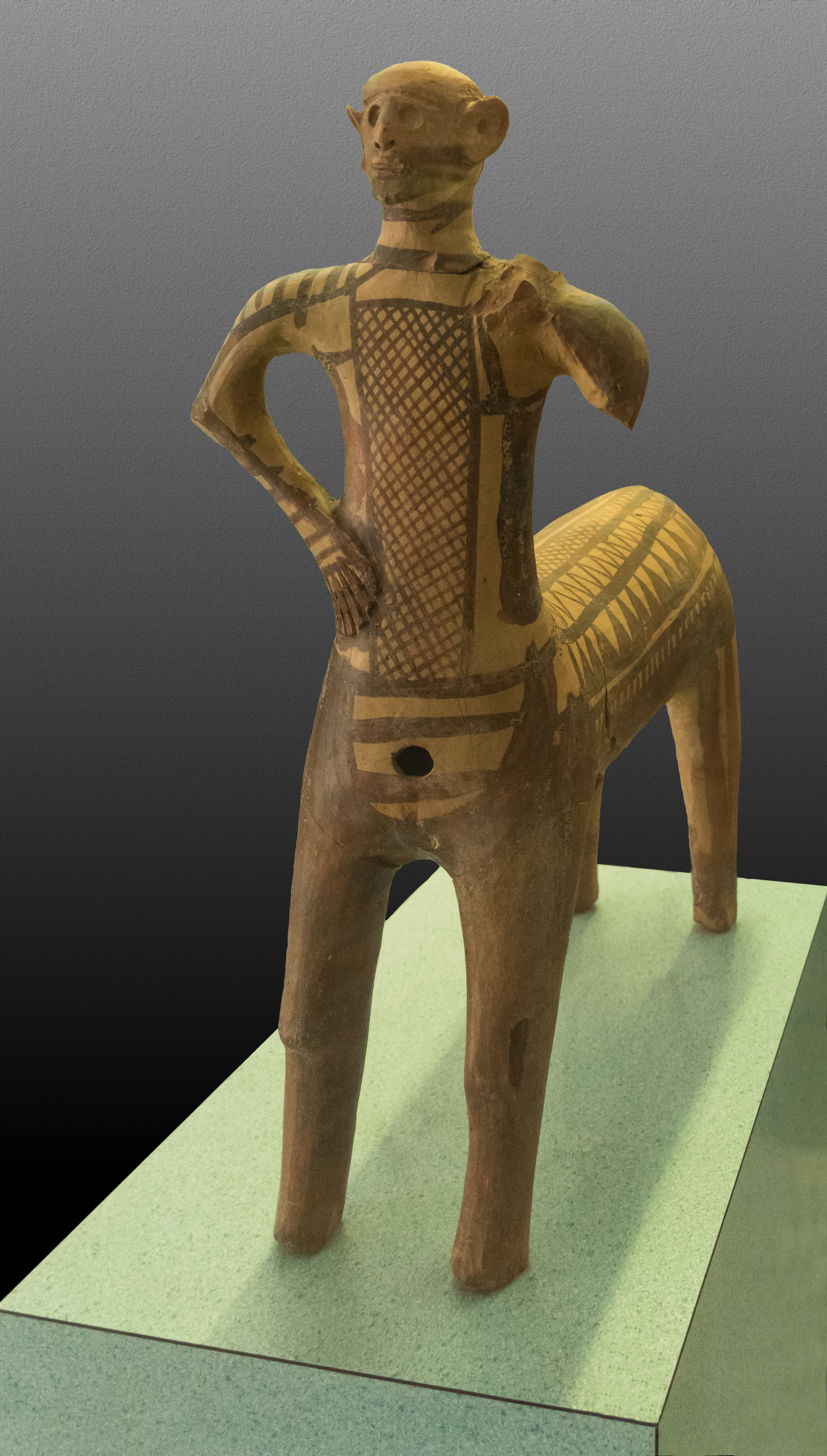
Centar Chiron of Lefkandi, c. 1050-900 BC, Archaeological Museum of Eretria

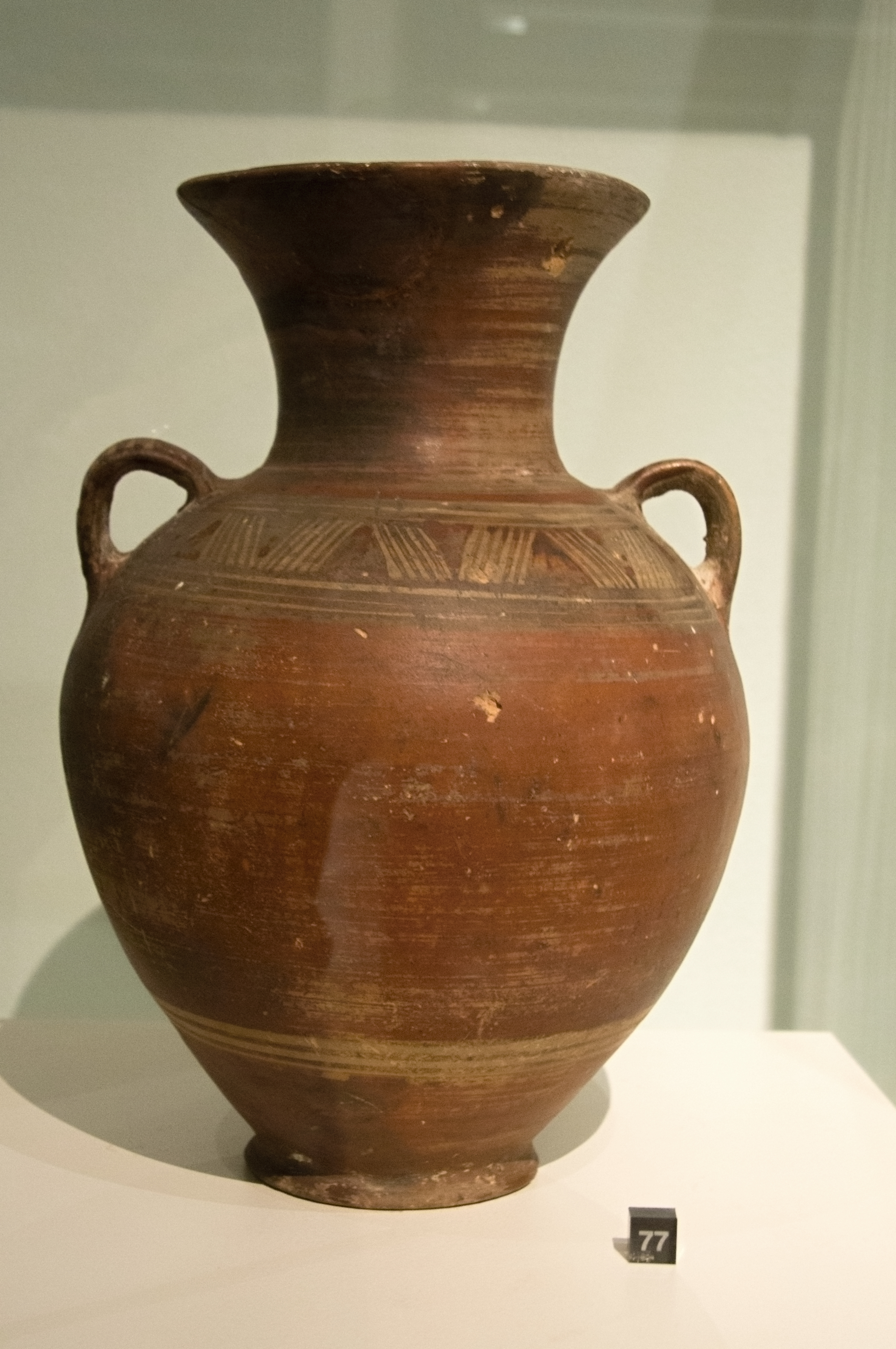
Shoulder handled amfora, Attic workshop, c. 875-850 BC

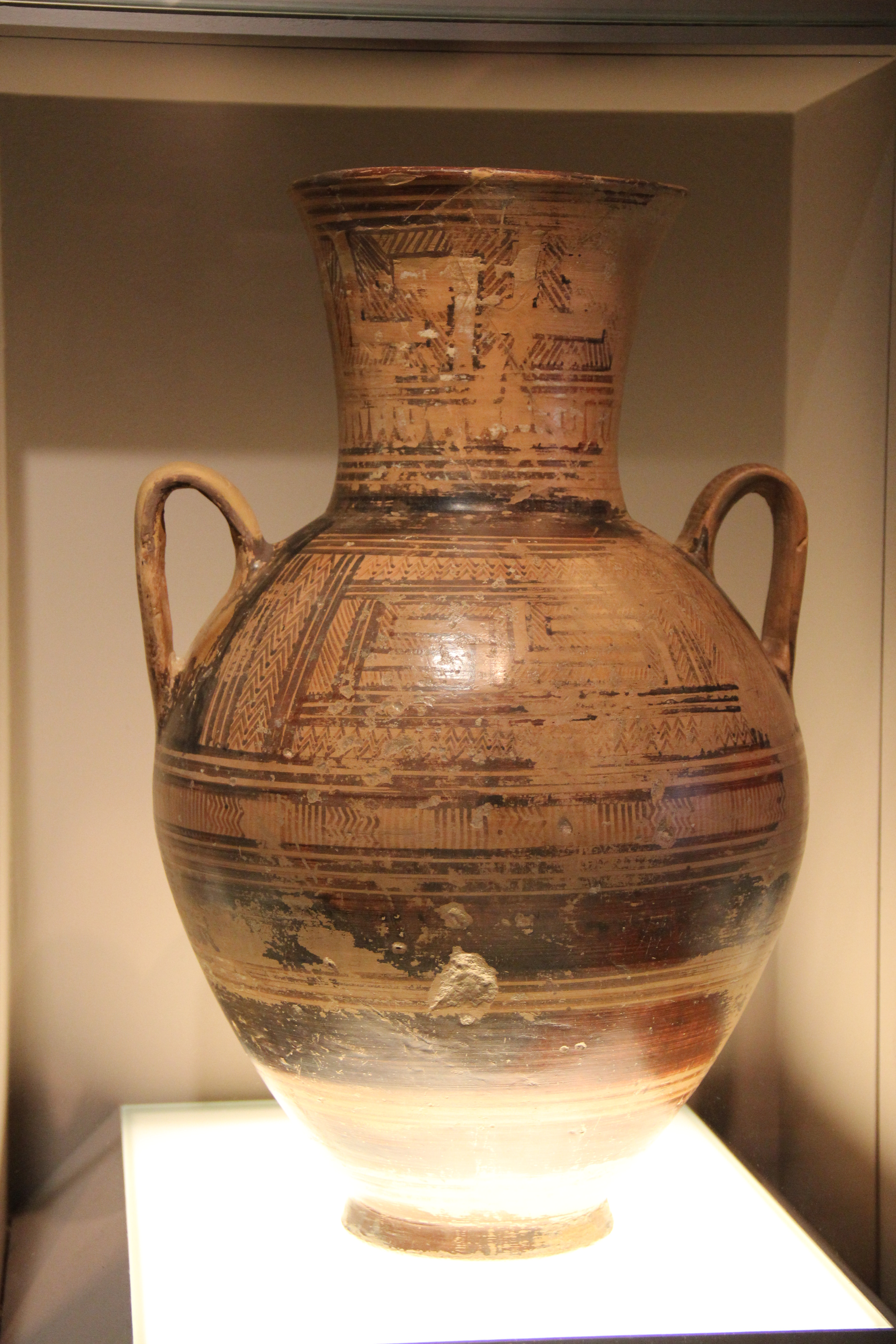
Clay amphora, c. 800-760 BC, Museum of Cycladic Art, Athens

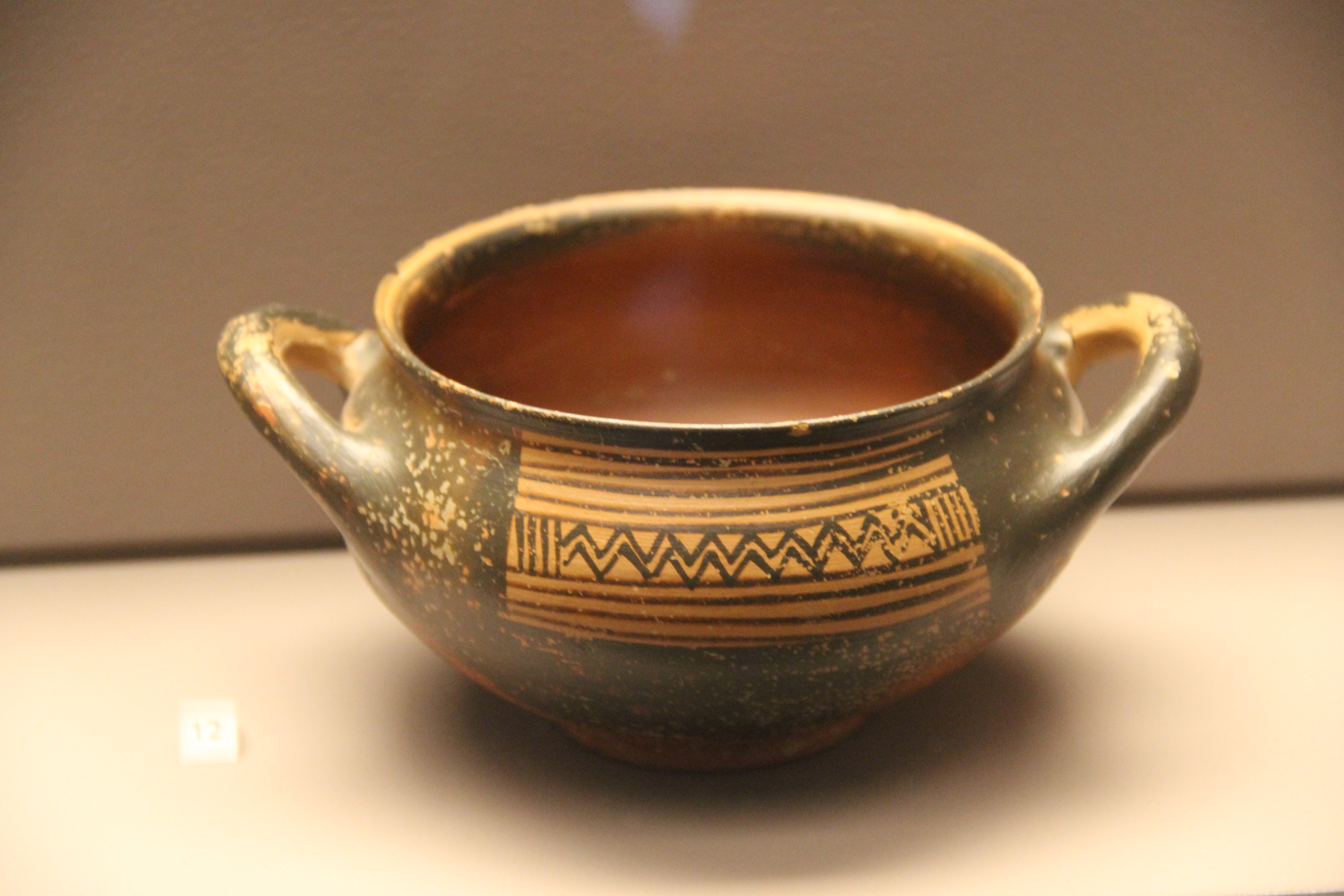
Clay skyphos, c. 775-750 BC, Museum of Cycladic Art, Athens

=== Late Geometric period ===
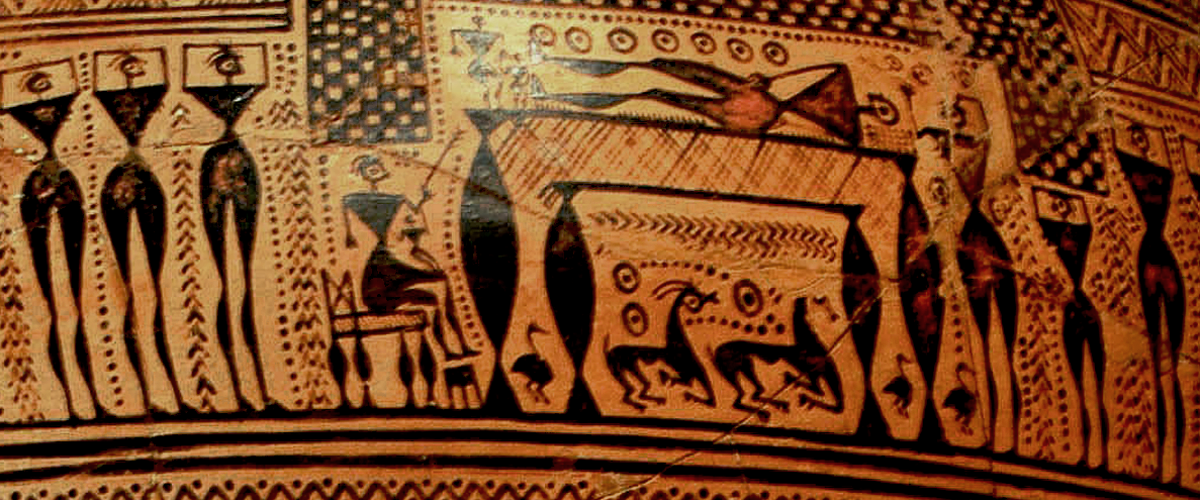
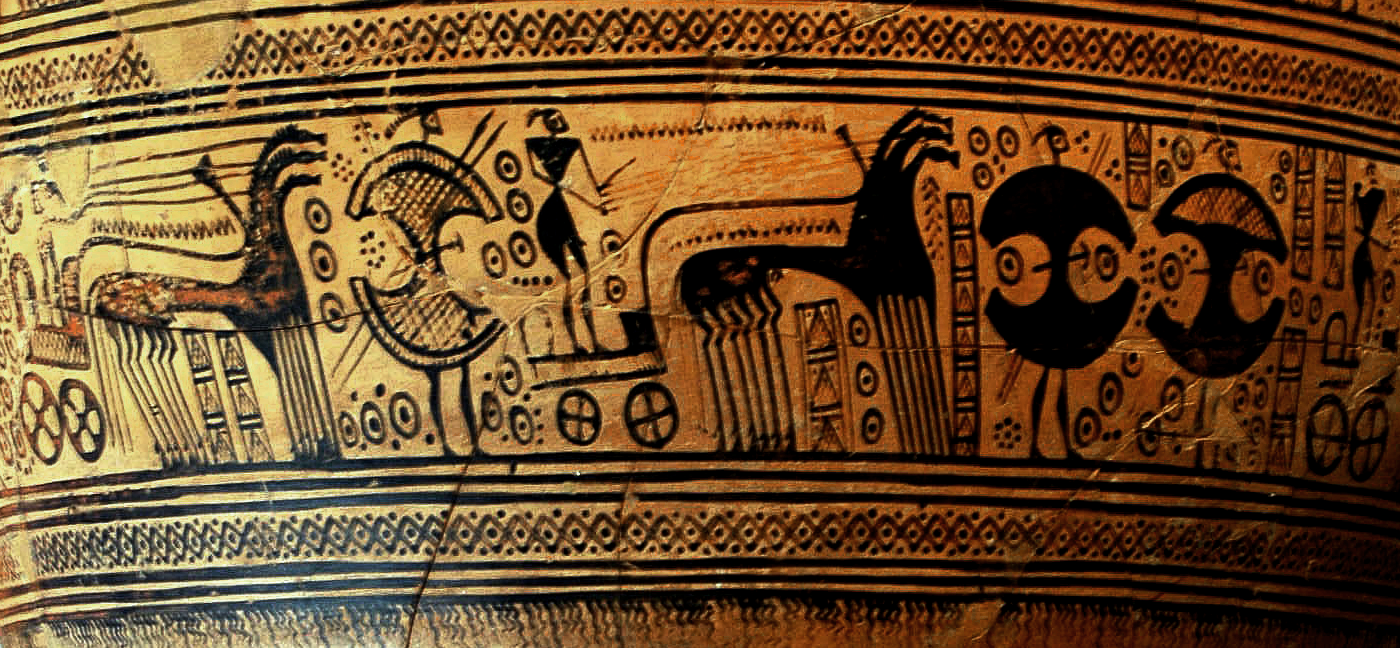
Detail from the Hirschfeld Krater (c. 750-730 BC); prothesis scene (above), ekphora scene (below)

Late Geometric period lasted from 750 to 700/650 BC. Some potters enriched again the decorative organization of the vases, stabilized the forms of the animals in the areas of the neck and the base of the vase, and introduced the human form between the handles. The late Geometric period was marked by a 1.62 metres (5 ft 4 in) amphora that was made by the Dipylon painter in around 760–750 BC. The vase was a grave marker to an aristocratic woman in the Dipylon cemetery. This was the first phase of the late Geometric period (760–700 BC), in which the great vessels of Dipylon ware placed on the graves as funeral monuments and represented their height (often at a height of 1.5 metres (4 ft 11 in)). The funerary imagery on the vases included the deceased person lying in state (prothesis) surrounded by mourning figures, or lying in a bed and carried to the grave with an honorary chariot procession (ekphora). It was accompanied by heroic scenes and warfare imagery, thought to be related to similar descriptions of the Homeric epics.

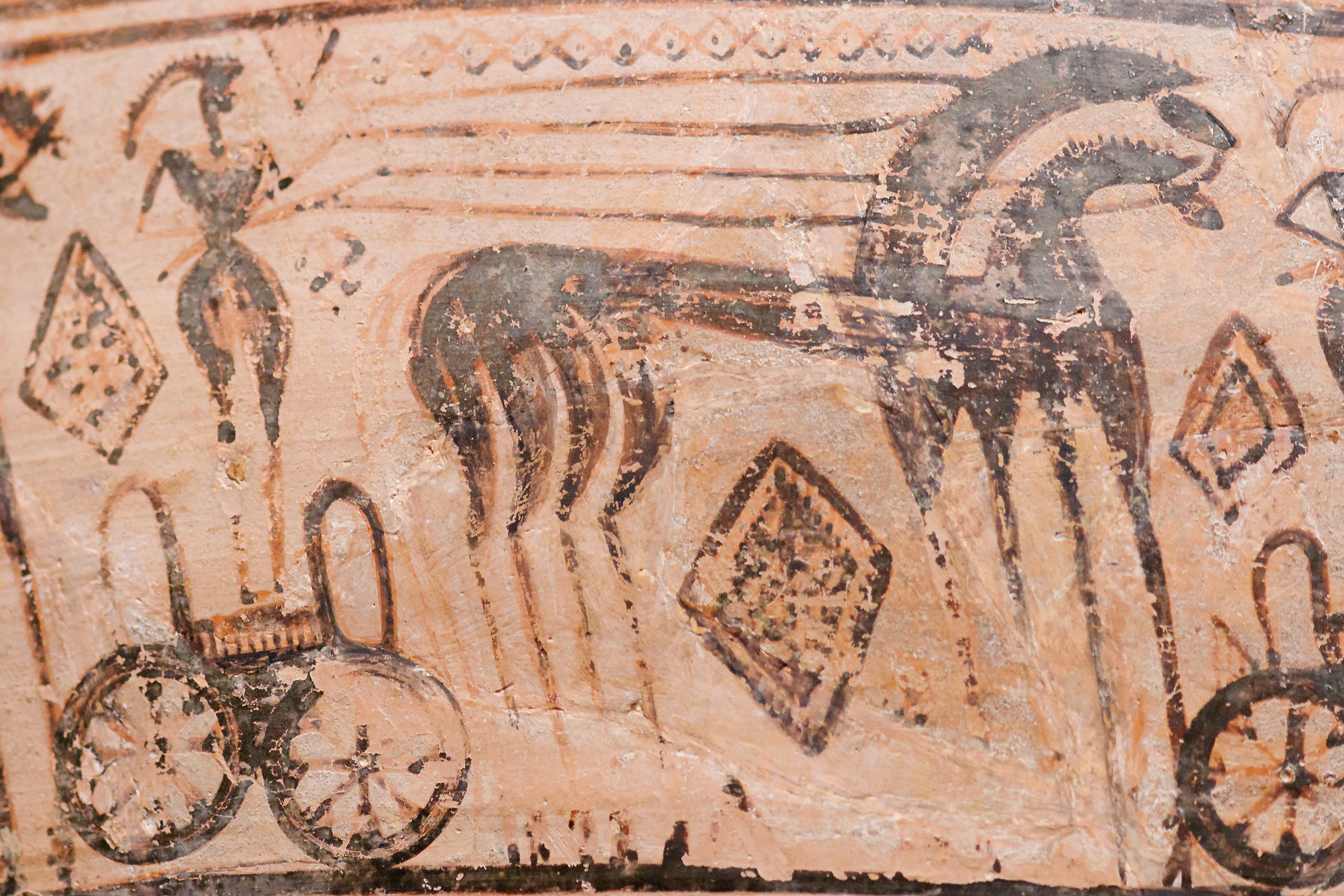
Detail of a chariot from a late Geometric krater attributed to the Trachones workshop on display at the Metropolitan Museum of Art

People and animals are depicted geometrically in a dark glossy color, while the remaining vessel is covered by strict zones of meanders, crooked lines, circles, swastikas, in the same graphical concept. Later, the main tragic theme of the wail declined, the compositions eased, the geometric shapes became more free, and areas with animals, birds, scenes of shipwrecks, hunting scenes, themes from mythology or the Homeric epics led Geometric pottery into more naturalistic expressions.

One of the characteristic examples of the late Geometric style is the oldest surviving signed work of a Greek potter, Aristonothos (or Aristonophos) (7th century BC). The vase was found at Cerveteri in Italy and illustrates the blinding of Polyphemus by Odysseus and his companions. From the mid-8th century BC, the closer contact between Greece and the East enriched the ceramic art with new subjects – such as lions, panthers, imaginary beings, rosettes, palmettes, lotus flowers etc. – that led to the Orientalizing period style, in which the pottery style of Corinth distinguished.

Based on excavations, and radiocarbon dating, at the site Zagora on the island of Andros, and previous datings at Sindos, Alagich et al. (2024) suggest Late Geometric I Period began around 120 years earlier than the traditional chronology, and lasted (c. 870-730 BC).

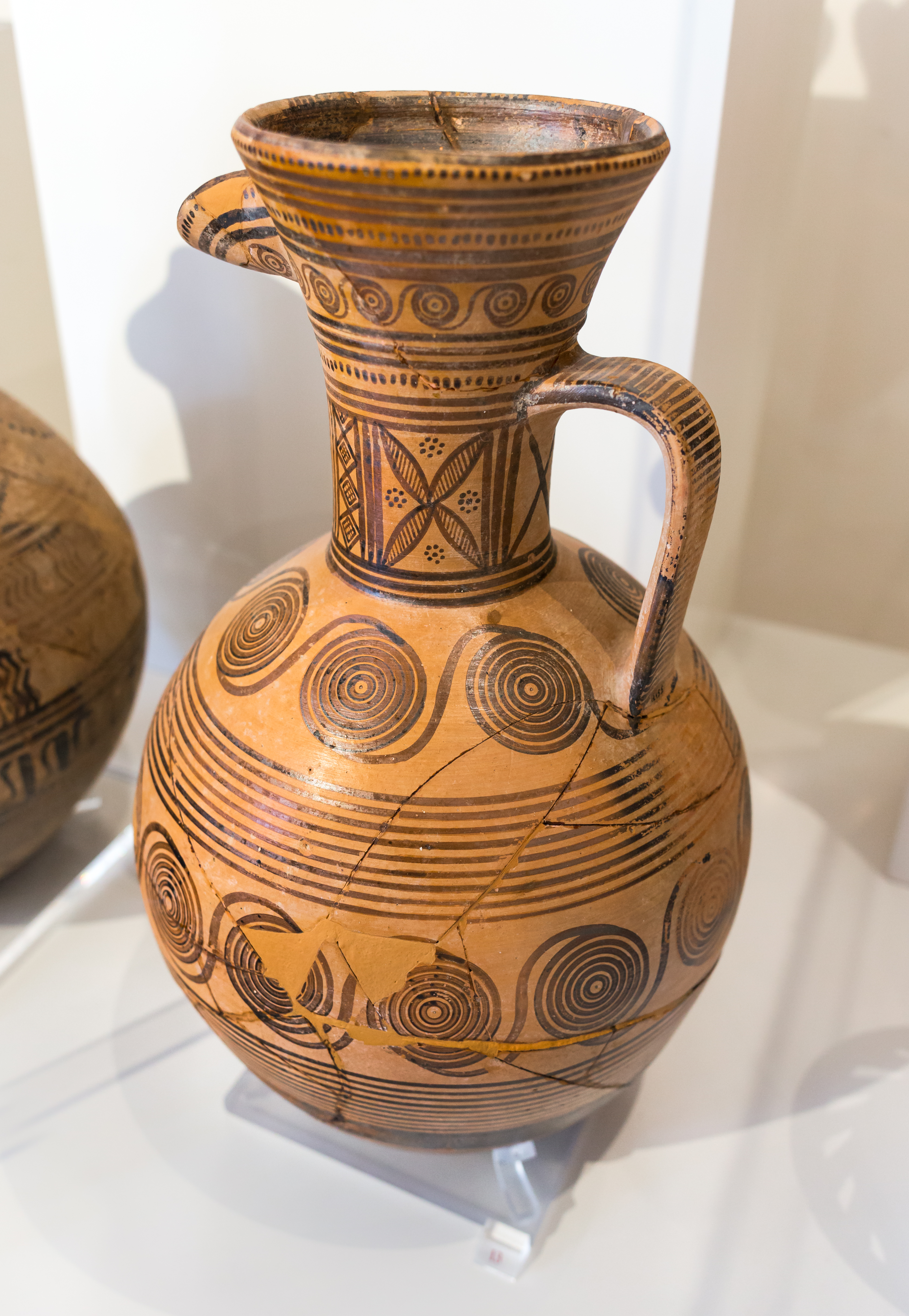
Boetian oinochoe, c. 750 BC, National Archaeological Museum, Athens

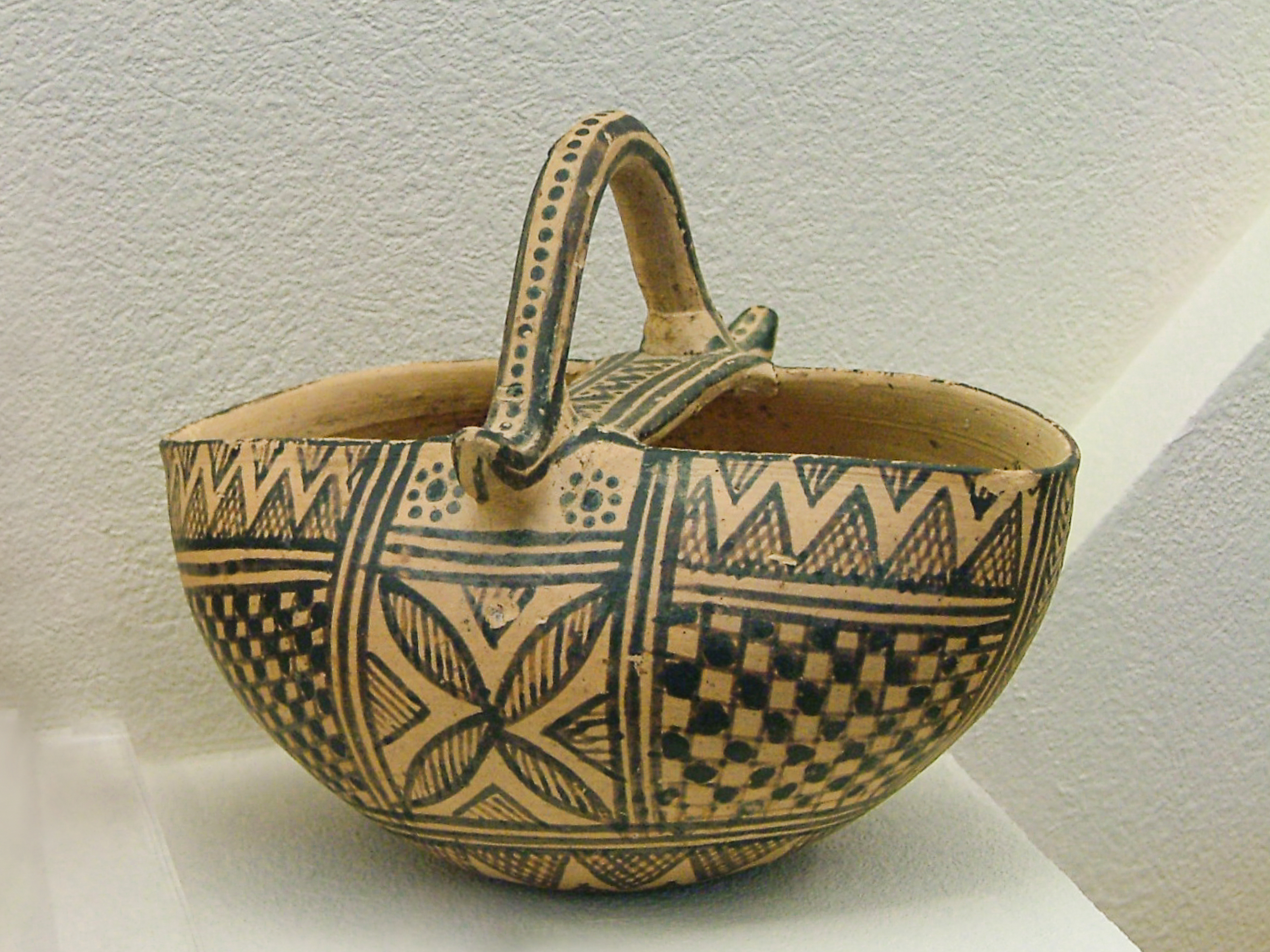
Kalathos from child burial, c. 750-700 BC, Kerameikos Museum, Athens

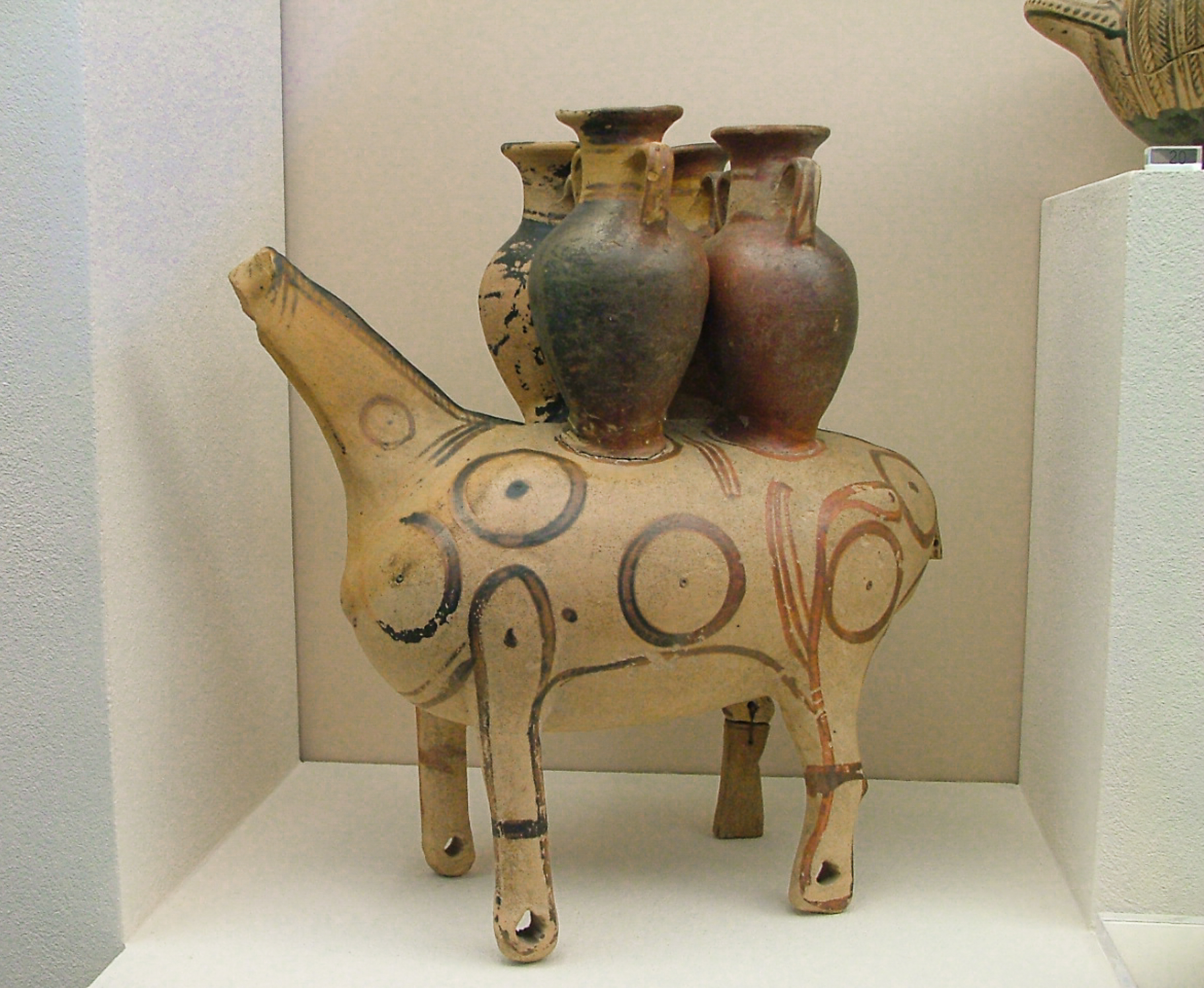
Horse figure carrying four amphoras from a child burial, c. 750-700 BC, Kerameikos Museum, Athens

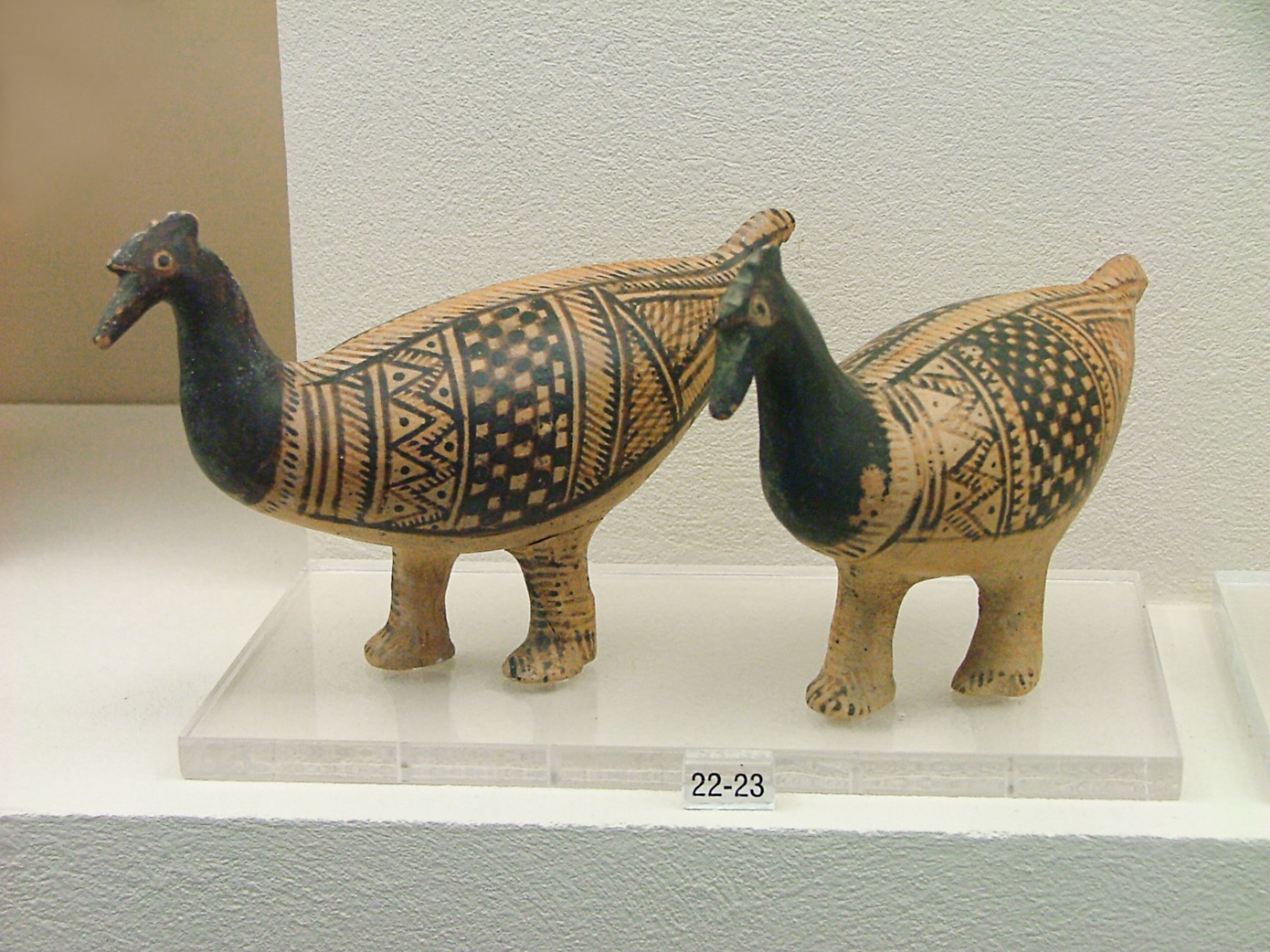
Bird figures from child burial, c. 750-700 BC, Kerameikos Museum, Athens

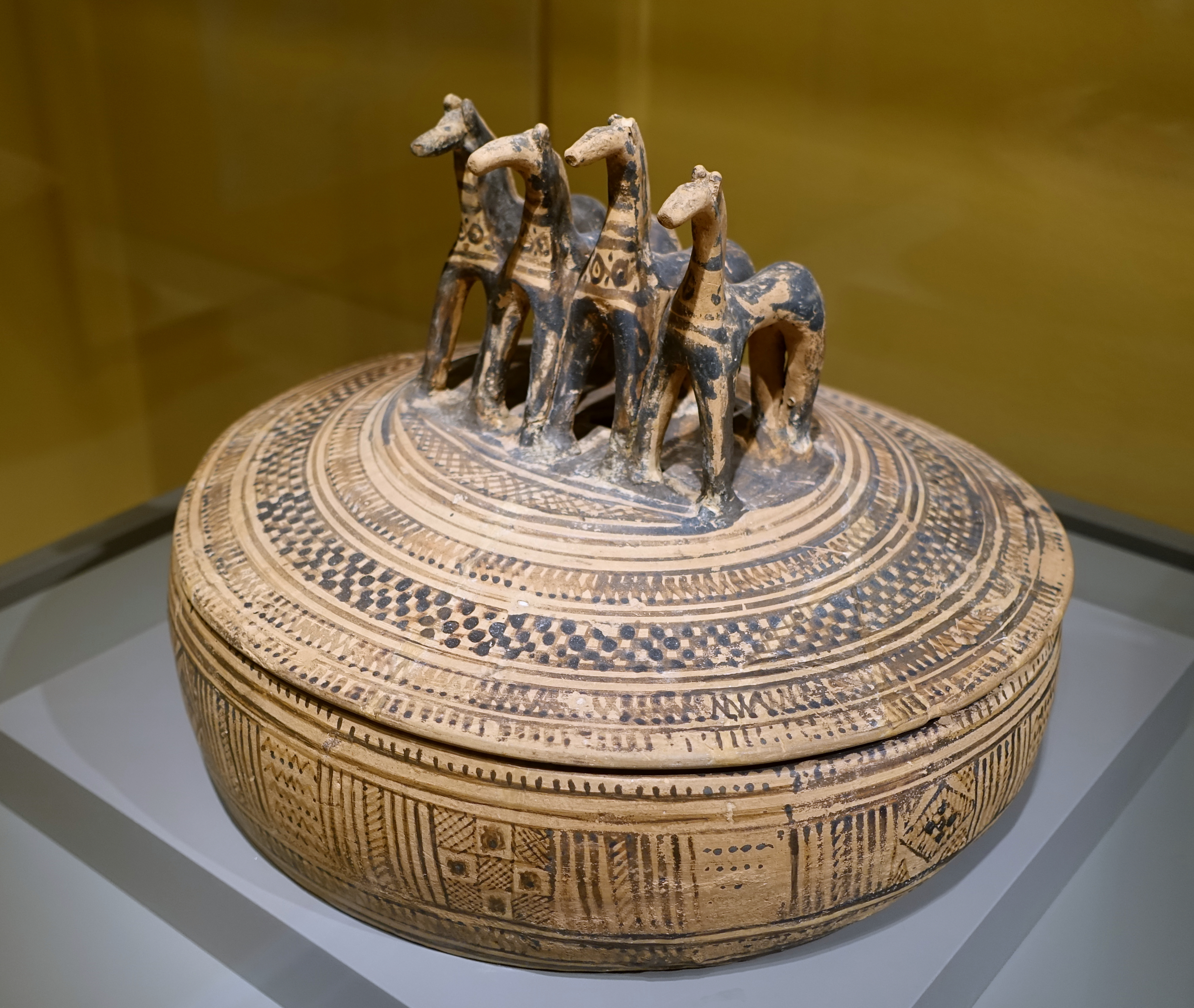
Attic pyxis with four horse figurines on top, c. 735 BC, Wadsworth Atheneum, Hartford

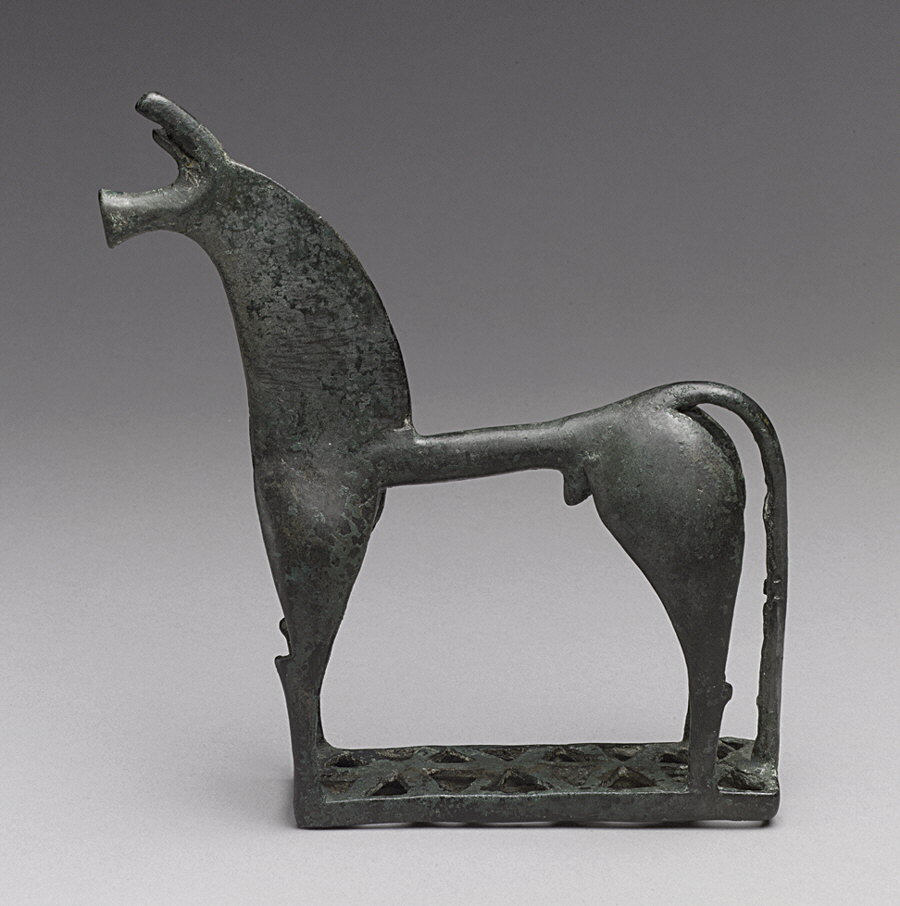
Bronze horse, 8th century BC

== Motifs ==
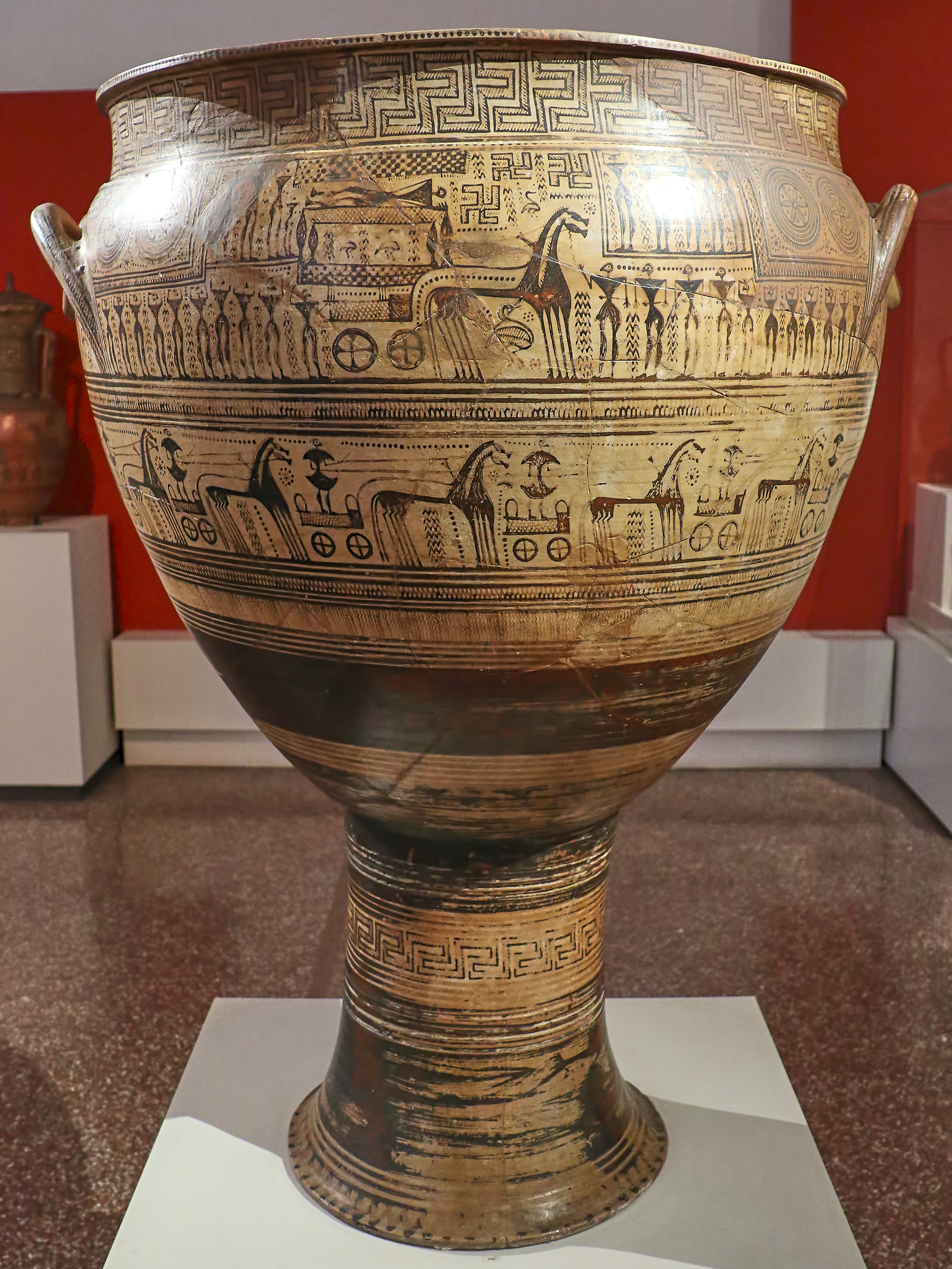
The Hirschfeld Krater, mid-8th century BC, from the late Geometric period, National Archaeological Museum, Athens

Vases in the Geometric style are characterized by several horizontal bands about the circumference covering the entire vase. Between these lines the Geometric artist used a number of other decorative motifs such as the zigzag, the triangle, the meander and the swastika. Besides abstract elements, painters of this era introduced stylized depictions of humans and animals which marks a significant departure from the earlier Protogeometric style. Many of the surviving objects of this period are funerary objects, a particularly important class of which are the amphorae that acted as grave markers for aristocratic graves, principally the Dipylon Amphora by the Dipylon Master who has been credited with a number of kraters and amphorae from the late Geometric period.

Linear designs were the principal motif used in this period. The meander pattern was often placed in bands and used to frame the now larger panels of decoration. The areas most used for decoration by potters on shapes such as the amphorae and lekythoi were the neck and belly, which not only offered the greatest liberty for decoration but also emphasized the taller dimensions of the vessels.

The first human figures appeared around 770 BC on the handles of vases. The human forms are easily distinguished because they do not overlap with one another, making the painted black forms discernible from one another against the color of the clay body. The males were depicted with triangular torsos, ovoid heads with blobs for noses and long cylindrical thighs and calves. Female figures were also abstracted. Their long hair was depicted as a series of lines, as were their breasts, which appeared as strokes under the armpits.

== Techniques ==
Two techniques of this time period include red-figure pottery and black-figure pottery. The black figure pottery started around 700 BC, and it remained the dominant style until its successor, red figure pottery, was invented around 530 BC. The switch from black figure pottery to red figure pottery was made due to the enhanced detail that red figured pottery allowed its artists.

== Narrative art ==
The notion of narrative during this time period exists between the artist and the audience. The artist communicates with the viewer, but the viewer's interpretation can sometime be an inaccurate interpretation. Furthermore, multiple interpretations of a singular artwork can be created by the viewer. A combination of historical, mythological, and societal context is needed to interpret the stories told within Greek Geometric art. The artwork during the Geometric period can be seen as "supplementary sources and illustrative materials for Greek mythology and Greek literature". The scenes that are depicted within Greek Geometric art contain various interpretations through analysis of the depicted scenes. Art historians must decide if the stylistic choices that were made during this time period were for a specific reason or simply coincidental.

== See also ==
External videos
- Geometric Greek Krater, Smarthistory.

- List of Greek vase painters § Geometric period
- Mycenaean pottery
- Apulian pottery
- Orientalizing period
- Kerameikos Archaeological Museum
- https://kerameikos.org/id/geometric_greece
