= Naiskos =

Small classical temple or shrine

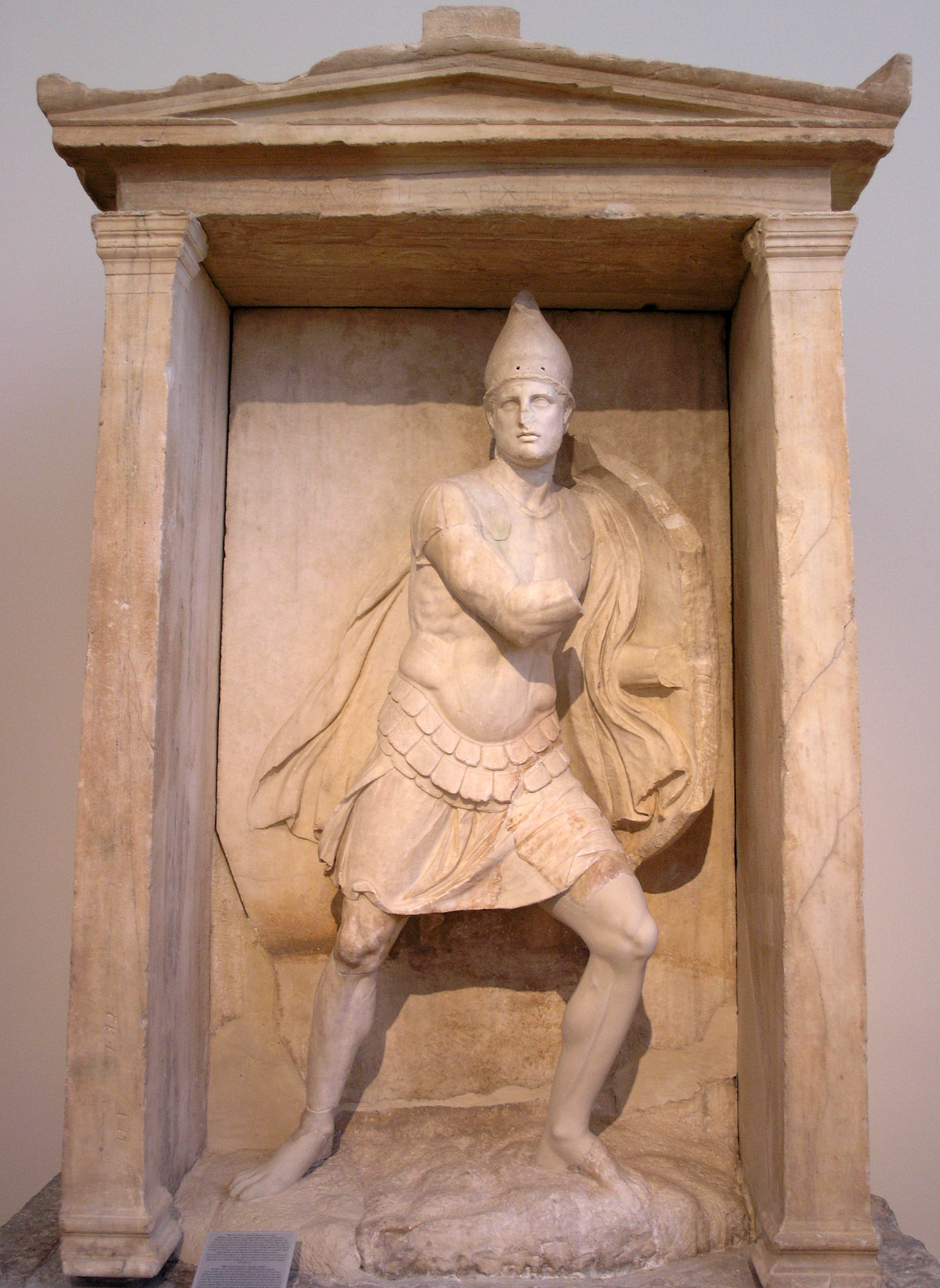
Funerary naiskos of Aristonautes from the Kerameikos, c. 330–310 BC, marble, h. 2.91 m

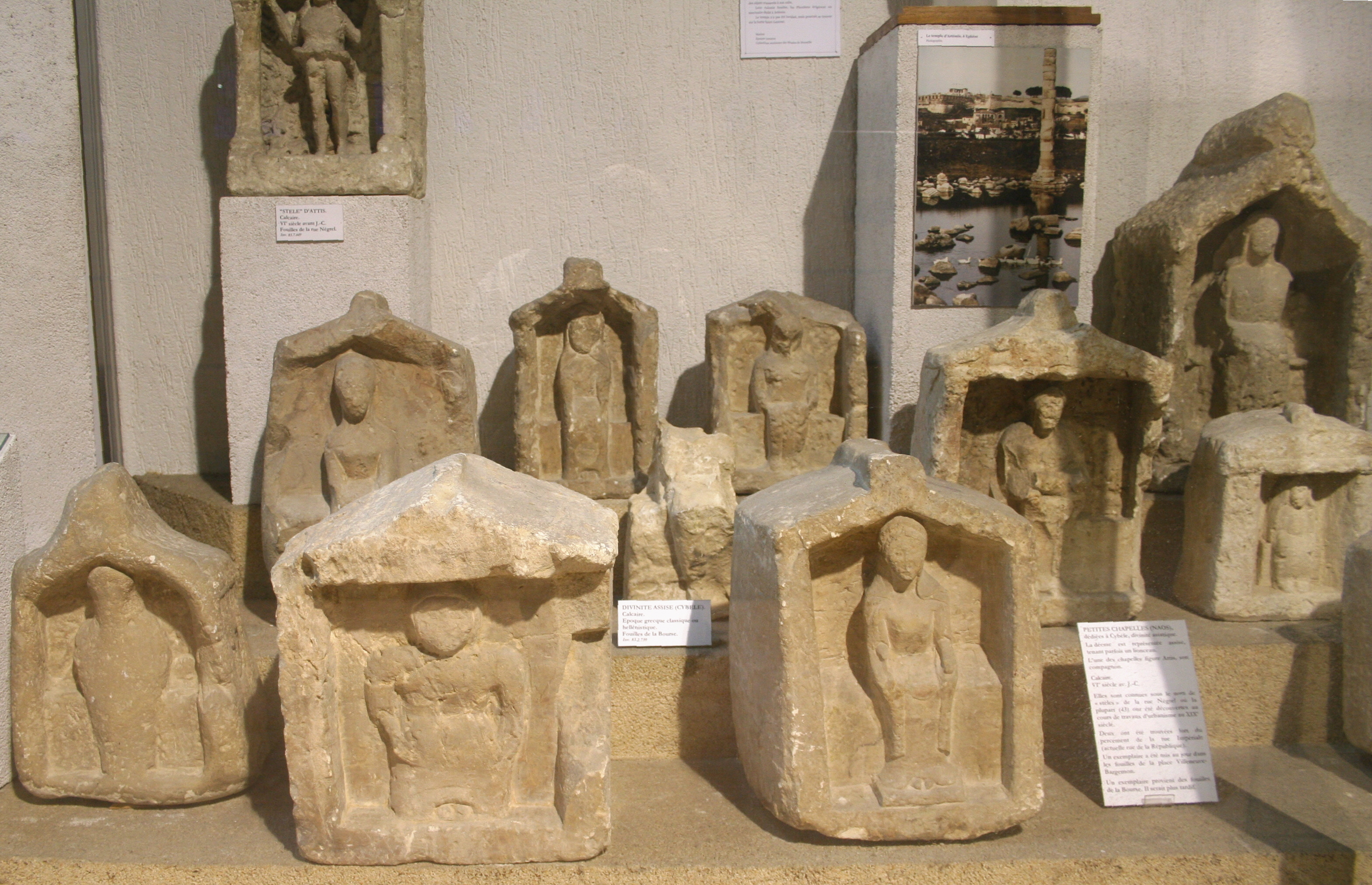
Naiskoi from Asia Minor, 6th century BC

The naiskos (pl.: naiskoi; Greek: ναΐσκος, diminutive of ναός, "temple") is a small temple in classical order with columns or pillars and pediment.

== Ancient Greece ==
Often applied as an artificial motif, it is common in ancient art. It is also found in the funeral architecture of the ancient Attic cemeteries as grave reliefs or shrines with statues, such as the stele of Aristonautes from Kerameikos in Athens and in the black-figure and red-figure pottery of ancient Greece at the Loutrophoros and the Lekythos and the red-figure wares of Apulia in Southern Italy.

== Other styles ==
There also exist naiskos-type figurines or other types of temples formed in terracotta, examples of which abound at the Louvre Museum in Paris. The form of the naiskos suggests a religious context, relating especially to Greek funerary culture. Some of the Hellenistic inscriptions found in the Bay of Grama are placed inside a naiskos, and in this case the religious context is an invocation of Castor and Pollux (Dioskouroi) for a safe passage across the Adriatic, rather than funerary.

A similar style, called the aedicula, is observed in Roman art.

== See also ==
- Funerary naiskos of Demetria and Pamphile

== Bibliography ==
- Magdalene Söldner, "Naiskoi für Menschen. Eine heroisierende Fiktion im unteritalischen Vasenbild", in Christine Schmitz, Anja Bettenworth (ed.), Menschen - Heros - Gott: Weltentwürfe und Lebensmodelle im Mythos der Vormoderne (Stuttgart, Franz Steiner Verlag, 2009), 35–52.
- Richard T. Neer, Greek Art and Archaeology: A New History, c. 2500 – c. 150 BCE (Thames and Hudson, 2012), 301–340.
- Arben Hajdari, Joany Reboton, Saïmir Shpuza, Pierre Cabanes, "Les inscriptions de Grammata (Albanie) [article]" (Revue des Études Grecques, 2007, 120–2), 353–394
