= Eleusinion =

Ancient sanctuary of Eleusinian Demeter in Athens near the Ancient Agora

Coordinates: 37.973686°N 23.724600°E

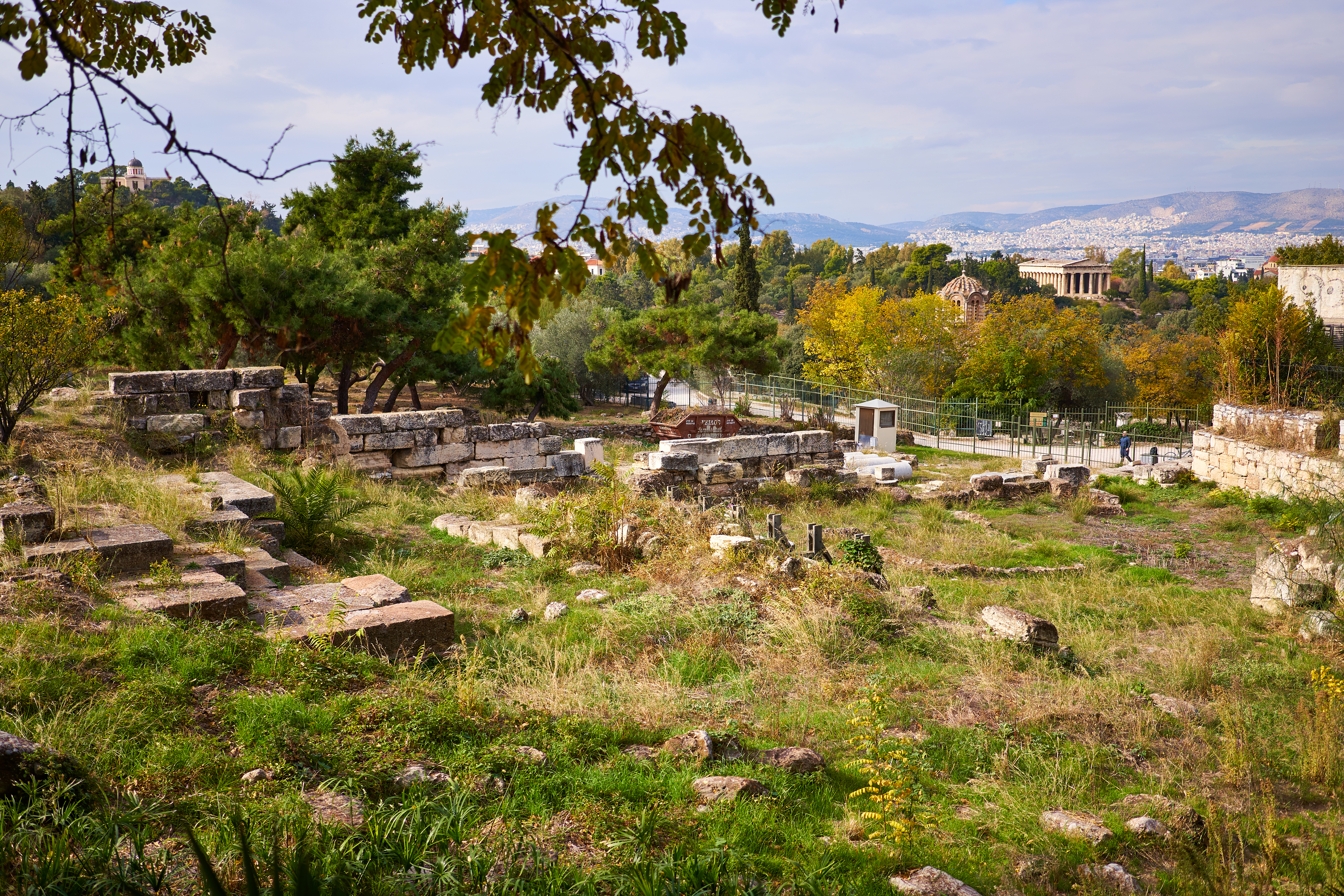
Remains of the Eleusinion, seen from the southeast. The platform at left is the northern end of the Temple of Triptolemus. The masonry wall in the background is the Post-Herulian Wall, which runs along the western boundary of the sanctuary.

Eleusinion (Ancient Greek: Ἐλευσίνιον), also called the City Eleusinion (Ancient Greek: Ἐλευσίνιον τὸ ἐν ἄστει, romanized: Eleusinion to en astei) was a sanctuary on the lower part of the north slope of the Acropolis in Athens, Greece, dedicated to Demeter and Kore (Persephone). It was the central hub of Eleusinian Mysteries within Athens and the starting point for the annual procession to Eleusis, in the northwest of Attica. Religious activity is attested in the area from the 7th century BC and construction took place throughout late Archaic, Classical, Hellenistic, and Roman periods. The sanctuary was enclosed within the new city walls built after the Herulian sack of Athens in AD 267 and it remained in use until the late fourth century AD.

Only the western part of the sanctuary has been excavated, which consists of an upper area and three terraces, centring on a small temple for the hero Triptolemus, an outer propylon (gateway) and a South Stoa. A circular building in the southernmost part of the sanctuary might be a banqueting hall dedicated to Plouton and a precinct at the northernmost edge of the area might have belonged to Hecate. Sculptural fragments have been discovered from an inner propylon which led to the actual Temple of Demeter and Kore in the unexcavated area to the east and literary sources mention further structures. Many inscriptions, sculptures, pottery vessels, and other offerings from the sanctuary have been recovered.

== Location ==
Location of the Eleusinion, in Athens.
1 Eleusinion
2 Acropolis
3 Athenian Agora

The sanctuary is located on the lower part of the northern slope of the Acropolis, just to the south of the Athenian Agora. The western boundary was the Panathenaic Way, along which the Post-Herulian Wall was built in the late third century AD. The southern limit is the perimeter road running around the upper slopes of the Acropolis. The northern boundary was the northern branch of the Street of the Tripods. The distance from north to south is about 200 metres. The eastern border is unknown, but may have been up to 200 metres from the western edge.

The general location of the sanctuary was known from references in Xenophon, Philostratus, scholia to Aristophanes, and especially Pausanias, who places it above the Enneakrounos (nine jets) fountain, which he locates in the south central Agora. The site was excavated as part of the American excavations of the Athenian Agora, in 1936-1939 and 1959–1960. Only a strip from the western edge of the sanctuary has been excavated, varying in width from 18 to 40 metres. Many structures known from literary sources have not been found and are presumed to be located further east, under modern housing.

Inscriptions, sculpture, and votive vessels relating to the Eleusinian cult are found throughout the Agora, but they cluster mainly in the area of the Eleusinion. Three inscriptions found in the area specifically state that they were to be set up in the Eleusinion. These factors confirm the identification of the site as the Eleusinion.

== Description ==
=== Literary sources ===
Pausanias describes the sanctuary in the 2nd century AD, as containing two temples, one for Demeter and Kore (Persephone) and the other for Triptolemus. There was a bronze statue of a bull in front of the latter. Pausanias says that he was forbidden from discussing the contents of the sanctuary in detail by a dream and says nothing about the temple of Demeter and Kore, but does describe the temple of Triptolemus. This seems to indicate that the sanctuary consisted of an inner, holier section containing the former temple and an outer, less holy section containing Triptolemus' temple.

Other sources refer to an altar, a source of purifying water, a shrine called the Tomb of Immaradus, and a Ploutonion.

=== Overview of archaeological remains ===
The sanctuary consists of an upper area and three terraces, descending down the slope from south to north. The original sanctuary consisted of only section II and the upper terrace, but it was later expanded to incorporate the middle terrace. It is unclear whether the lower terrace was actually part of the sanctuary.

Section II

The upper (southernmost) area is "Section II", a steep slope, located outside the peribolos wall, but apparently part of the original sanctuary area, since archaeological evidence reveals votive deposits. There is also a circular building of Hellenistic date. A vaulted branch of the aqueduct of Hadrian, built in the mid-2nd century AD, runs along the north side of the section, ultimately feeding into the nymphaeum in the southeast of the Agora. To the south of that was a narrow Roman road, which led to a gate in the Post-Herulian wall.

Upper terrace

The upper terrace, formed by a flat section of bedrock was the original core of the sanctuary. It contains a "rocky outcrop" at the western edge, which is 2 metres wide, 3 metres long and rises above the surrounding area. Such outcrops were often important in cults of Demeter throughout the Greek world. The area is enclosed by a polygonal limestone wall ("the Archaic peribolos"), built around 575-550 BC. It varied between 0.9 and 1.15 metres in thickness at the base; the whole 22 metre-long stretch is preserved on the western side; the foundation trench and shorter stretches are preserved on the northern and southern sides for 26 and 28 metres respectively. The eastern wall has not been uncovered. The original entrance to the precinct was on the south side, 3 metres from the western end, opening onto "Section II". A second entrance was built on the same wall, 20 metres to the east, in the period 350-325 BC, possibly part of the construction work of 329/8 BC. In the Hellenistic period, the south peribolos wall was demolished and the South Stoa was built over the top of it, separating the upper terrace from "Section II" and sealing both entrances. A propylon (gateway) was built into the peribolos wall on the west side, near the southern end, at the same time as the South Stoa was built, and served as the main entrance to the Eleusinion thereafter. The north edge was of the upper terrace was formed by a retaining wall 6.8 metres north of the Stoa, which was demolished in the 4th century AD.

Middle terrace

The middle terrace was added to the sanctuary at the end of the 6th century, doubling the size of the sanctuary. The temple of Triptolemus stood here, with its entrance facing onto the edge of the upper stoa. The area was surrounded by the "early 5th-century peribolos wall," which is preserved in small stretches on the west and north. It is made of limestone and was 1.10 metres wide. The northern wall has been revealed for a length of 28 metres. The western wall was 21 metres long and continues the archaic peribolos. The northern and western parts of the peribolos were covered over by a massive retaining wall in the 4th century BC. It may have supported a platform for viewing the Panathenaic procession. There were steps on the outer west face of this retaining wall for inscribed stelae. A 0.8 metre-wide dividing wall runs north–south to the east of the temple, diving the it off from the inner sanctuary.

Lower terrace

The lower terrace, originally a marsh, was created at the end of the 6th century BC with the rubble from clearing the middle terrace of houses. It was outside the peribolos wall of the Eleusinion and it is unclear whether it was part of the sanctuary. A 6-meter-long east–west wall at the western end of this terrace, just north of the retaining wall, was built in the fourth century BC, it may have been the peribolos for a small adjunct shrine, of which no trace now remains. In the 1st century AD, the area was flattened and a complex was built on the western edge of the terrace, consisting of four rooms, three bases for monuments or altars, and an offering table. This complex may have been a workshop, a separate sanctuary, or - most likely - a set of storerooms for the Eleusinion's grain supply. The northern edge of the lower terrace was bound by an east–west street from the 6th century BC until the Ottoman period. Abutting this street and the Panathenaic Way, in the northwest corner of the sanctuary, was a small precinct, probably for Hecate.

=== Temple of Triptolemus ===
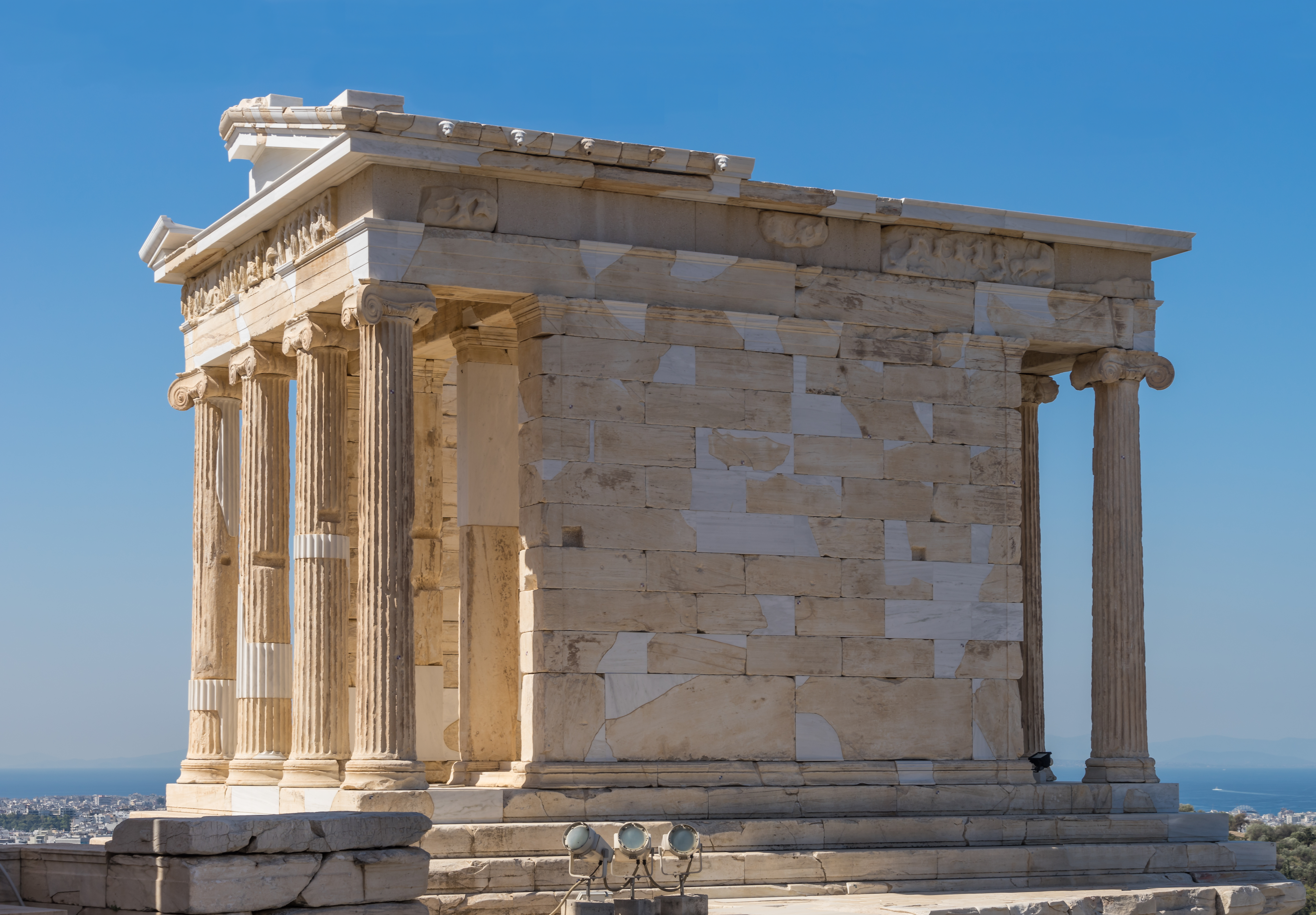
The Temple of Athena Nike, an Ionic tetrastyle amphiprostyle temple, similar to Margaret Miles' reconstruction of the Temple of Triptolemus in the City Eleusinion.

The temple faces north–south and is 17.813 m long and 11.065 metres wide. The entrance was at the south end (i.e. opening onto the upper terrace). Traces of the foundation and roof have been found; nothing from the superstructure survives, but it was probably made of marble, like the roof. Margaret Miles proposes that the dimensions and materials indicate that it was an Ionic tetrastyle amphiprostyle temple, i.e. with four Ionic columns at the north and south ends. This is the same design used for the later Temple of Athena Nike on the Acropolis. The columns would have been about 1.10 m in diameter at the base. Construction began on the temple between 500 and 490 BC, as shown by pottery evidence from the foundations. The remnants of the roof seem to date to 475-450 BC. This date coincides with the proliferation of images of Triptolemus in Athenian art. The chief of works may have been Coroebus, who also oversaw the construction of the 5th century Telesterion at Eleusis.

The foundations are made of gray kara limestone, but yellow poros and limestone from the Acropolis were also used in the walls. Because of the steepness of the slope, the south end of the temple sits directly on the bedrock, while the north end required ten courses of masonry. The cuttings in the bedrock for the temple's foundations are still visible on the western side. The foundations were built of high-quality polygonal masonry, without clamps or dowels. The foundation blocks survive for the whole north side and parts of the western and eastern sides. The foundations of the cross-wall that separated the pronaos from the cella are partially preserved. An extension was added to the east side of the temple during construction, which measures 2.20-2.355 m wide and is composed of red crystalline blocks originally cut for use in some other context. The addition may have been made so that the width:length ratio of the temple would be closer to the golden ratio, which became popular in temple construction at this time.

The remains of the roof consist of 88 fragments from marble tiles (30 cover tiles, 58 pan tiles, 1 end ridge tile) and 4 marble antefixes. The workmanship is of a very high standard. The palmettes of the antefixes resemble the archaic Telesterion at Eleusis (510-500 BC), and especially those from the roofs of the treasuries in the sanctuary of Apollo at Delos (478-450 BC).

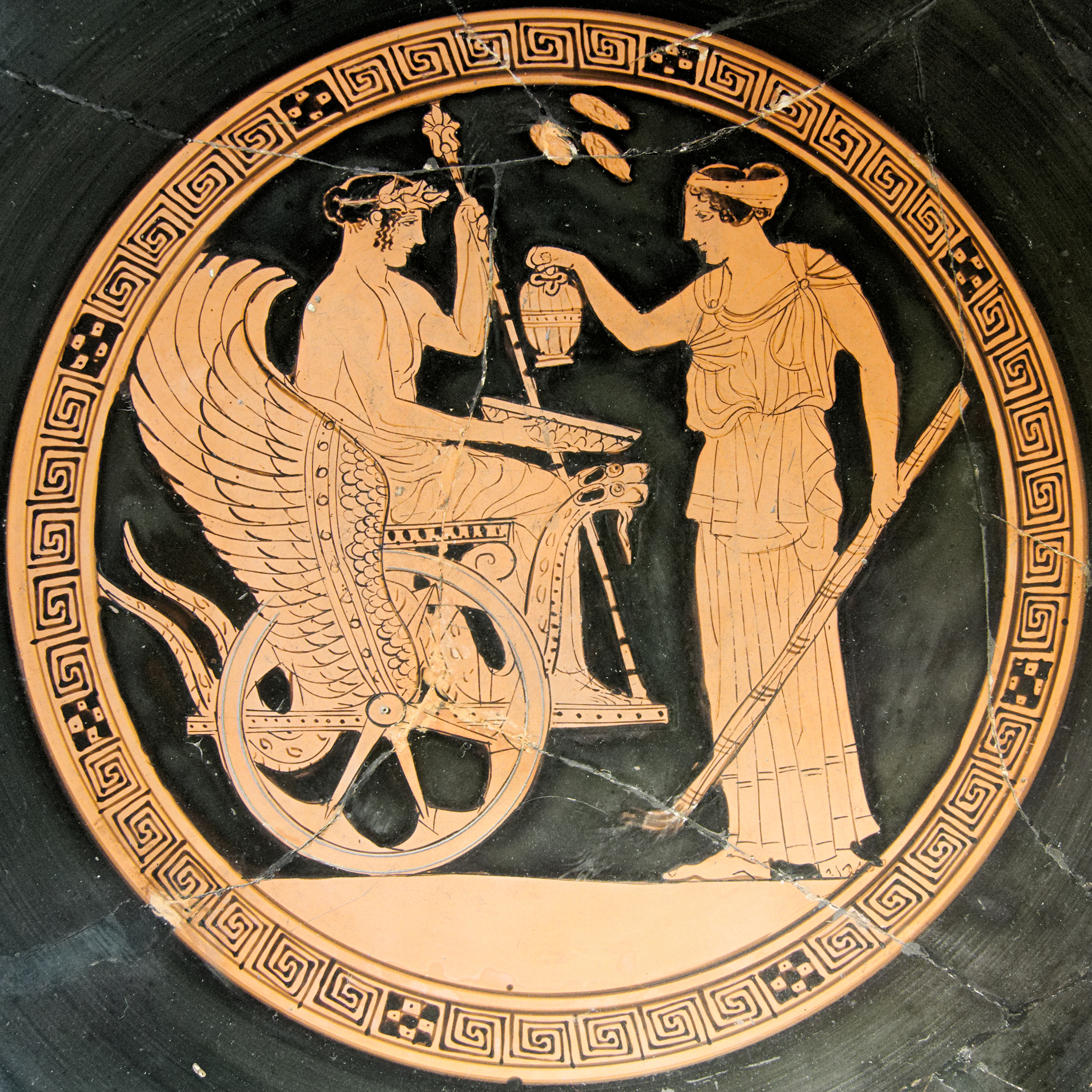
Depiction of Triptolemus and Kore on a mid-5th century BC Attic red-figure cup.

The archaeological remains are identified as the temple of Triptolemus mentioned by Pausanias because his account indicates that it was in the outer part of the sanctuary and archaeology shows that the entrance to the Eleusinion in his time was through the propylon next to this temple. In mythology, Triptolemus was the first human to receive the gifts of farming and initiation into the Eleusinian Mysteries from Demeter. He then rode around the world in a winged chariot, informing all people of these gifts.

Pausanias states that there was a statue of Triptolemus inside the temple. This has not been discovered archaeologically, but is probably one of the symbols depicted on fourth-century BC Panathenaic amphorae. There are examples from 364/3 onwards showing the statue standing in a winged chariot holding a branch, with a snake next to the chariots wheels. Pausanias also mentions statues of the semi-legendary seer Epimenides and of a bull in front of this temple. The latter probably depicted the bull with gilded horns which was the standard sacrificial offering for Triptolemus according to the late fifth-century First-Fruits decree. To the east of the temple, there are the limestone foundations of altar (1.10 x 2.70 metres), probably built in ca. 500 BC. East of this is a 2.20 metre long monument base of yellow poros, running east–west, which was built in the period 450-425 BC; it seems to have been intended to support a set of inscribed stelae (no longer present).

=== Outer propylon ===
A propylon (gateway) was built into the peribolos wall on the west side, near the southern end, in the 2nd century BC, opening onto the Panathenaic Way. It served as the main entrance to the Eleusinion thereafter. It was a porch, with an H-shaped ground plan, i.e. two walls perpendicular to the peribolos wall which supported a roof, and a cross-wall between them, containing the actual doors.

The foundations are consist of poros, conglomerate, and marble blocks - many of them reused - set directly into the bedrock. In the centre, the foundations were covered over by Hymettan marble pavers, some of which survive. The date of construction is indicated by pottery sherds found in the packing of the foundations and by parallels with other Athenian structures of similar date. It precedes cuttings made into the bedrock to the west in order to lower and pave the Panathenaic Way in the first and second centuries AD.

The propylon was incorporated into the Post-Herulian Wall in the late third century AD.

=== South Stoa ===
The South Stoa was added on the south side of the upper terrace in the second century BC, replacing the archaic peribolos. This stoa provided a sheltered area facing the temple of Triptolemus, which was used for dedications and for visitors to the sanctuary. It measures 8.90 metres from north–south. The excavated portion is 25.40 metres long, but the stoa continued further east into the unexcavated area. Fragments from the superstructure indicate that the steps were made of Hymettan marble, while the columns and entablature were Pentelic marble. The columns were roughly three metres apart and were probably Doric. It was probably only one story high, but this is not certain. A set of diamond and oval lattice window frames might come from a second-story balustrade or from the western and eastern walls. At the east end, the back wall is preserved to a height of 2.75 metres. The interior floor was a layer of beaten earth, which slowly wore away until visitors were walking directly on the bedrock.

Three phases of construction are attested in the back (south) wall. In the first, preserved for the western 18.5 metres, the foundation was built from regular yellow poros orthostates (0.65 metres high, 1.15 metres long, 0.42 metres thick), connected together with wooden clamps, and topped by dressed masonry. A second-century BC date for this initial phase is indicated by pottery in the fill of the foundations and by the absence of mortar. In the second stage, in the late Roman period, the orthostates were patched using irregular limestone blocks topped brick and mortar (preserved in the eastern portion). Finally, in Byzantine times, the wall was patched again with brick and stone, serving as a wall for later structures. At the north side of the stoa, a 1.5 metre wide cutting runs the whole length of the stoa. Conglomerate blocks sat in this cutting supported the front steps and columns. The short western exterior wall had bases for mounting inscriptions, which could be read by passers-by on the Panathenaic Way.

Destruct debris shows that the stoa went out of use in the late fourth century. By the 6th century, parts of its structure had been incorporated into new buildings and a ramp had been built through the back wall to allow access to the east–west road behind it.

=== Circular building ===
A circular building was constructed 17.2 metres south of the South Stoa in Section II. It is known from a circular cutting in the bedrock and part of a poros wall, preserved to a height of 0.52 metres. The bedrock around the structure was smoothed down to create a flat area. The cutting indicates that it had a diameter of 7.75-8.00 metres, but the blocks of the wall come from an Archaic or Classical structure which was also circular, but larger, with a diameter of about 19 metres. This earlier structure must have been located somewhere else.

The floor was packed clay and at the exact centre of the room, a 1.35 metre wide millstone was set in the floor. There are no internal supports for a roof, so it may have been a simple flat structure of timber.

Remains of at least five altars were found nearby, confirming that the building served a religious function. Margaret Miles suggests that it was used for ritual dining. This is supported by the discovery of large amounts of cooking ware in the area. A well on the east side of the building may have been connected with this function. In particular, the circular building may have been linked with meals held in honour of Plouton, who is known to have had a shrine in the City Eleusinion. It may also have been connected with the Thesmophoria.

The structure was built in the 2nd century BC, as shown by pottery from the fill of the foundations. Fills from the northwestern and eastern sections show it was dismantled and rebuilt with the same plan but a new floor around AD 100, probably in connection with a new drainage system, which closed the eastern well. A final set of fills show that it was partially dismantled in the late 2nd or 3rd centuries AD.

=== Inner propylon ===
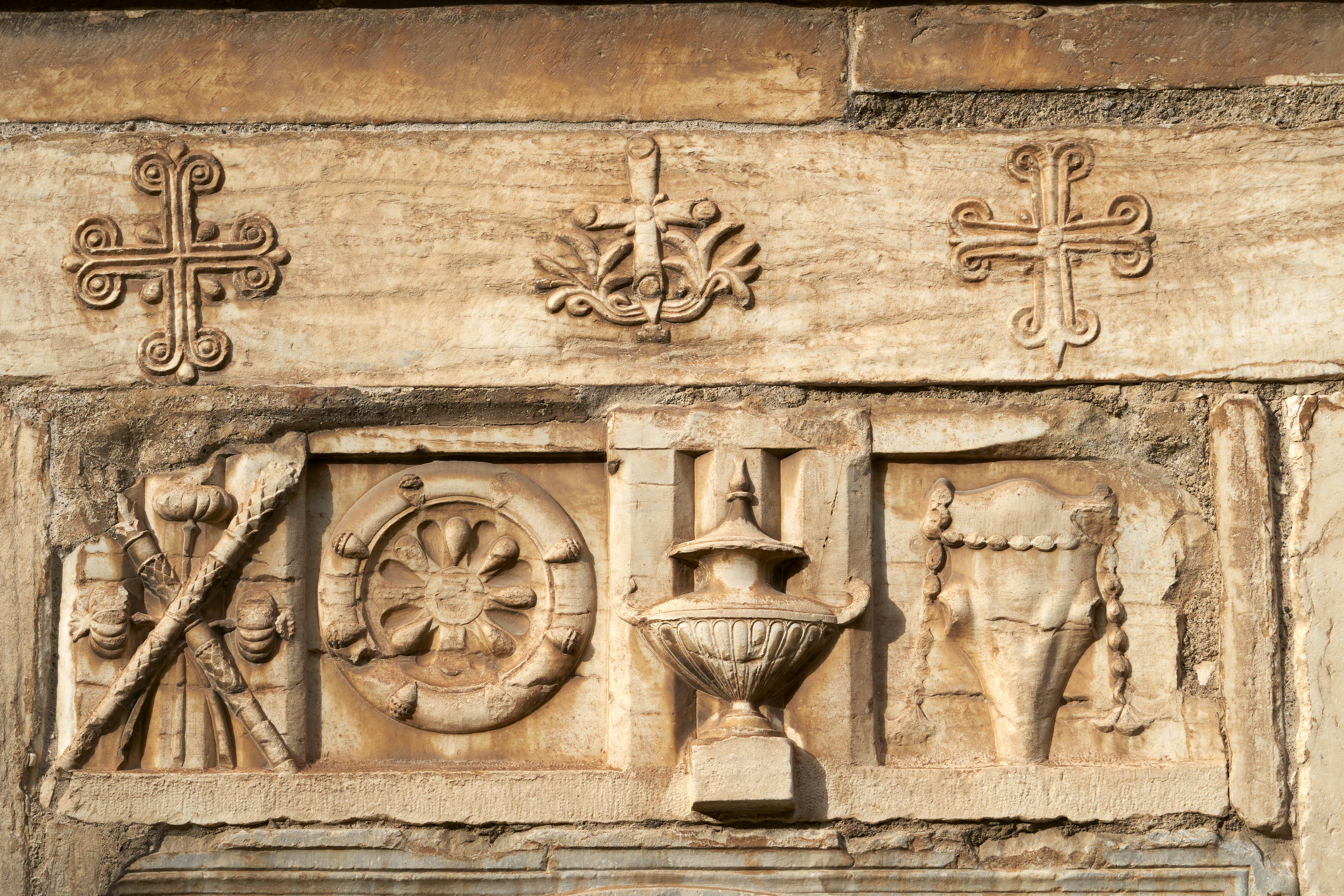
Part of the Doric frieze from the Inner propylon, reused above a side-entrance to the Little Metropolis.

The inner propylon, built in the mid-second century AD, was a monumental gateway leading from the outer sanctuary (the excavated area, centring on the Temple of Triptolemus) to the inner sanctuary centring on the Temple of Demeter and Kore, which was closed to non-initiates. The foundations of this structure have not been excavated, but fragments of the masonry and sculpture have been found in the excavations and reused in the Little Metropolis.

The fragments closely parallel those from the inner propylon of the sanctuary at Eleusis, which provides the basis for a reconstruction. The main sculptural fragments are two caryatids, which would have stood on the inner side of the gate, supporting a porch. A Doric frieze on the outside of the gate consisted of metopes and triglyphs with Eleusinian symbols (poppies, myrtle, plemochoae, phialae, bucrania). Parallels between structures at Eleusis and in the city of Athens are typical of those constructed under Hadrian, part of "an imperial Athenianisation of Eleusis."

== History ==
The site was occupied in the Neolithic period and in the Middle Bronze Age, because of the nearby Klepsydra spring. The middle terrace contained housing from ca. 850 BC, while the terracotta figurines found in the upper terrace indicate that it was a religious sanctuary for a female deity at this time. The absence of signs of habitation in the area may indicate that it was already a sacred site before this. The upper terrace was enclosed by the Archaic peribolos wall ca. 575-550 BC. This may have been the work of the tyrant Peisistratus, but this is not certain; it may pre-date him. No literary sources refer to a connection between him and the Eleusinian cult.

At the end of the sixth century or the beginning of the fifth century, the middle terrace was cleared of housing and added to the sanctuary, more than doubling its size. The first evidence specifically identifying the site as the Eleusinion are a pair of altars associated with the new temple, which are inscribed with the regulations of the Eleusinian Mysteries and date to ca. 510-500 BC. Construction of the temple of Triptolemus began around 500, was interrupted by the Persian Wars, and was completed between 475 and 450 BC. Three deposits indicate that the sanctuary was damaged during the Persian sack of Athens in 479 BC. It is likely that a new temple of Demeter and Kore was built at this time as well, although there is no archaeological evidence for this, since it has not been excavated.

The sanctuary was one of the few sites in Athens not to be occupied by refugees from the countryside at the outbreak of the Peloponnesian War, according to Thucydides, because its walls and gates allowed it to be locked. In 414 BC, following the conviction of Alcibiades and others for the profanation of the mysteries and mutilation of the Herms, their property was seized and auctioned off. A set of ten inscriptions known as the "Attic Stelae", which listed all the property, sales prices, and purchasers, were erected in the Eleusinion, where most of the 77 known fragments have been found. All the Eleusinian officials uttered curses against the convicts, except for the priestess of Demeter and Kore, Theano, who declared that she was "a praying priestess not a cursing priestess." A series of inscribed accounts describe the contents of the sanctuary in 408/7 BC, including many gold votives, as well as construction materials.

A financial account from 329/8 BC describes extensive repairs to the Eleusinion in that year, as part of the wider revitalisation of Athens and its cults spearheaded by Lycurgus. This was also the period when most votive relief plaques were dedicated.

In the second century BC, a major renovation to the sanctuary took place, involving the construction of the South Stoa, the Hellenistic Propylon, and the circular building. Two inscriptions honour individuals for undertaking construction in the sanctuary at this time. One is fragmentary; the other honours Satyra priestess of the Thesmophori for repairing all the temples, the sanctuary of Plouton, and paying for annual sacrifices. The period from the 3rd century to the early 1st century BC is also the time when most of the honorific decrees were erected in the sanctuary - seventeen are known, mostly honouring epimeletai (organisers) of the Eleusinian Mysteries.

The Panhellenion, established by Emperor Hadrian in 131/2 AD, seems to have had a role in the administration of the Eleusinion and the Eleusinian cult. They had a letter from an Imperial official inscribed on a stele on the outer west side of the sanctuary. The section of the Panatheniac Way running along the west side of the sanctuary was lowered and paved in two stages in the first and second centuries AD. A branch from the aqueduct of Hadrian was built behind the sanctuary in the mid-second century AD. In the same period, the inner propylon seems to have been built and the circular building was renovated.

=== Late Antiquity and after ===
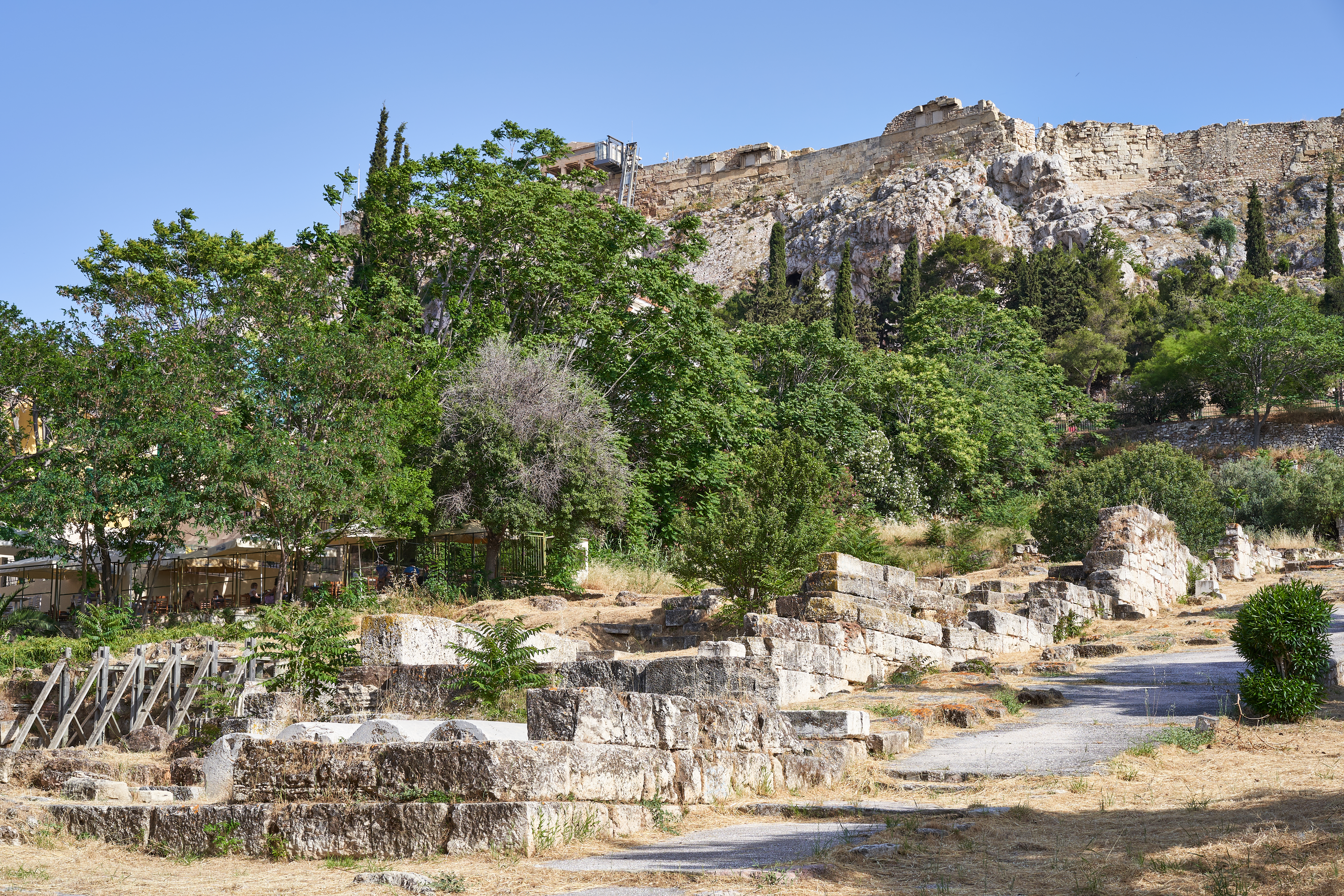
The Post-Herulian Wall at the Eleusinion, seen from the northwest.

The sanctuary's continued importance is shown by the fact that, after the Herulian Sack in 267 AD, it was placed inside the Post-Herulian wall (much of the city, including most of the Agora was left outside this new circuit wall). That the sanctuary continued in use is shown by the fact that, unlike many other structures, it was not spoliated to provide building material for the wall. The Eleusinian cult remained active until at least 375 AD, but is unlikely to have survived the Anti-pagan legislation of Theodosius I. The South Stoa and perhaps the Temple of Triptolemus were demolished at the end of the fourth century, probably as a result of Alaric the Goth's sack of Athens in AD 396.

The area was then covered over with houses and a laundry complex was built on the western end of the south stoa in the 7th century AD, taking advantage of the water supply still provided by the aqueduct of Hadrian. There was a large fire in the area in the reign of Constans II (641-668), which destroyed the laundry and would have seriously damaged any Classical structures that were still standing. Spoliation of masonry and sculpture from the area took place throughout the Byzantine and Ottoman periods, but especially in the 9th-10th centuries, when there was a quarry on the lower terrace. The churches of Hypapanti and of Christ were built at the south and north ends of the area respectively, in the 17th century, incorporating the gates of the Post-Herulian wall and parts of the sanctuary into their foundations. The Church of Christ had fallen into ruin by the 1850s, but its northern wall is still in situ and its wall paintings are faintly visible. The Church of Hypapanti was deconsecrated and demolished in 1936 to allow the excavations to take place. At the beginning of the nineteenth century, the area had a reputation as a good source of marble for use as building material. Marbles from the Eleusinion have been found in old buildings throughout the old centre of Athens, notably in the Little Metropolis. It remained a residential area until excavated in the twentieth century.

== Function and activities ==
The Eleusinion was the Athenian base of the cult of Demeter and Kore at Eleusis in western Attica. It was one of several sanctuaries in the city of Athens that linked the city to a cult in an outlying area of Attica, alongside the sanctuary of Artemis of Brauron atop the Acropolis and that of Dionysius of Eleutherae on the south slopes of the Acropolis.

At the start of the Eleusinian Mysteries, sacred objects were brought from Eleusis to the Eleusinion by the ephebes. They were stored there for the first five days of the festival. During this time people who wished to be initiated into the Eleusinian mysteries gathered in the Eluesinion to undergo the "pre-initiation" (myesis) under the guidance of members of the two Eleusinian clans, the Eumolpidae and the Kerykes. Aside from this, non-initiates were not allowed to enter the inner part of the sanctuary, which was demarcated by the inner propylon. On the sixth day of the festival, a great procession took them back to Eleusis, where they were revealed to the initiates at the culmination of the mysteries. After the mysteries, the Council of Five Hundred met in the Eleusinion in order to review the conduct of the festival.

The Eleusinion was probably also one of the sites where women celebrated the Thesmophoria festival.

Two inscriptions from the late fourth century BC and one from the first century BC honour wealthy Athenian men for preparing ritual meals in honour of Plouton. From the late Hellenistic period, these meals may have been held in the circular building in section II.

During the games at the Great Panathenaea festival, several cavalry races were held on the Panathenaic Way, with their end point at the Eleusinion. In the second century BC, these included a chariot race and the apobates.

=== Votive deposits ===
Seventh century BC votive deposits consist of terracotta figurines, miniature vessels, pottery, spindles, loom weights, and disks. The figurines are called "columnar females" because the body is formed from a long column that flares out at the bottom to represent a skirt. There are two outstretched arms and a ball for the head that was pinched to make the nose. Sometimes breasts were added. They differ from the figurines found in contemporary deposits elesewhere in the Agora, which are mostly horses and shields.

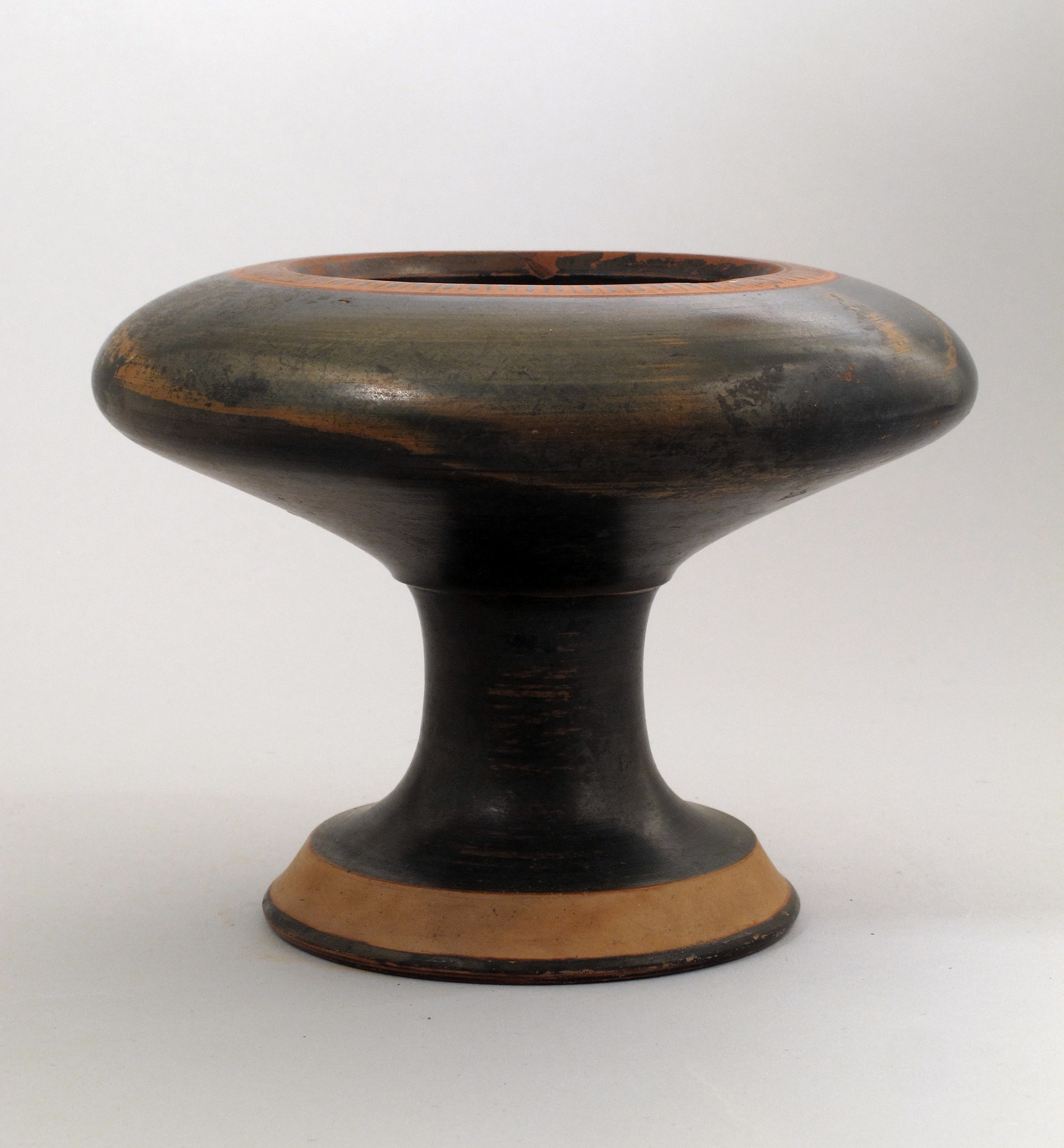
A 5th-century BC plemochoe (lid missing), a typical Eleusinian dedication.

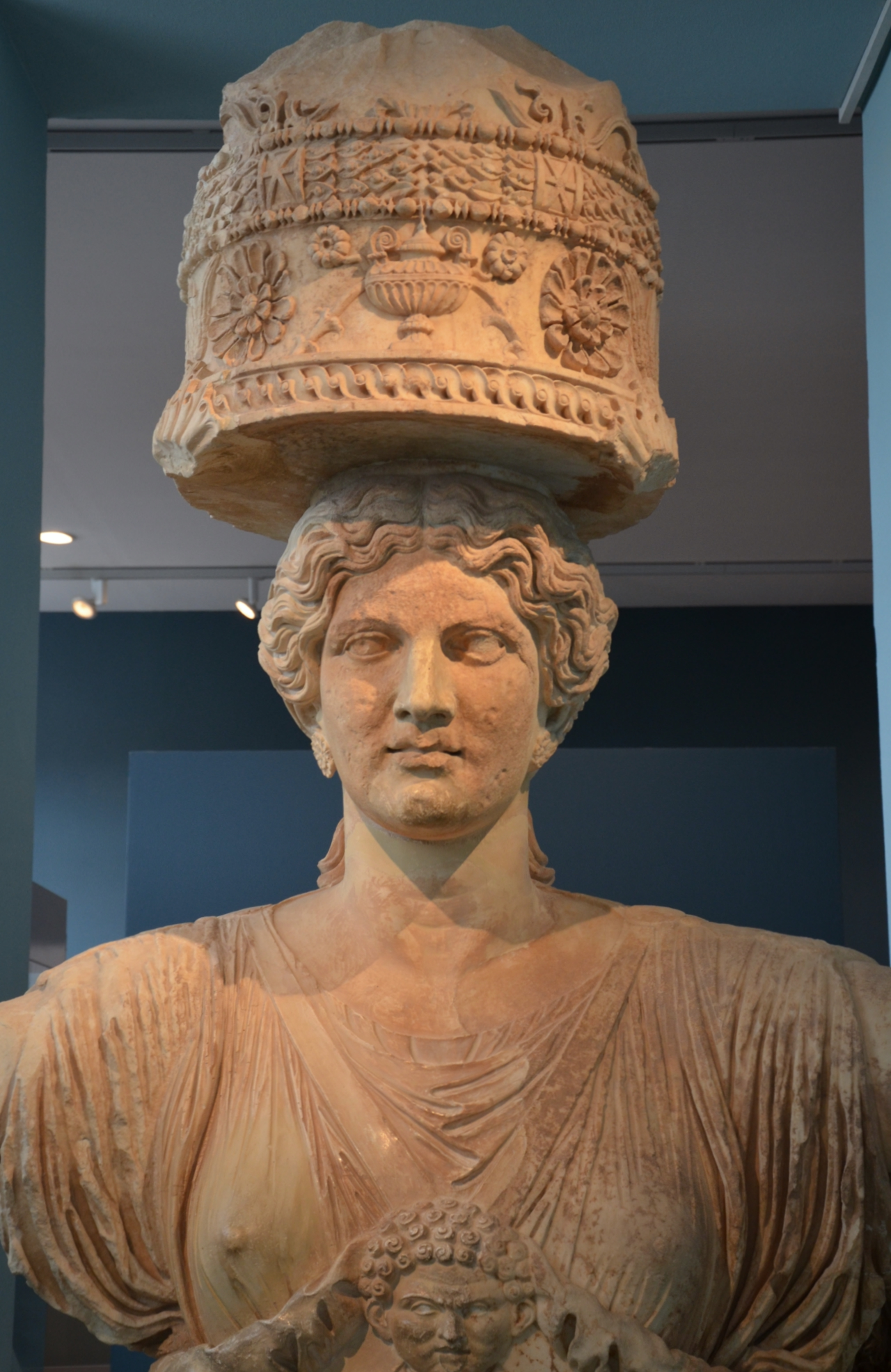
Plemochoe depicted on the front of a cista supported by a caryatid, at Eleusis.

A pottery vessel called a plemochoe (Ancient Greek: πλημοχόη) is a common votive find in the sanctuary from the beginning of the 4th century BC until the end of the 2nd century BC. They consist of a high foot supporting a wide bowl, ranging in diameter from 0,024 metres to 0.26 metres, with a handle on either side. Originally they had peaked lids with holes in them. They are rarely decorated and are made of soft or coarse clay, suggesting that they were only intended to be used once. They are depicted on the relief from the inner propylon and a similar relief from Eleusis. A large marble plemochoe (0.62 metres high) was found in Section II of the Eleusinion, suggesting an association specifically with the shrine of Plouton. In processions, women carried them on top of their heads. According to Athenaeus, on the last day of the Eleusinian Mysteries two plemochoae were filled with liquid and then tipped over, one to the west and one to the east, while a magic formula was recited. Their close connection with the Eleusinian cult is shown by the fact that they are rarely found in any context aside from the Eleusinion and the sanctuary of Demeter and Kore at Eleusis. In many cases they were buried in holes specifically cut for them in the bedrock, a chthonian setting, which corroborates the association with Plouton.

From the fifth century BC through the 4th century AD, various individuals dedicated monuments in the sanctuary, mostly statues. Twenty-six inscribed bases from these statues are known, of which the earliest is a dedication of two crowns by the priestess Lysistrate around 450 BC. Of the rest, eleven were dedicated in the 4th century BC, one in the 3rd century BC, five in the 2nd century BC, four in the 1st century BC (including a herm of Phaedrus the Epicurean), and one each in the first four centuries AD. Nineteen pieces of sculpture have been recovered, including thirteen votive reliefs. Most of these depict Demeter and Kore and belong to the 4th century BC. Three depict Triptolemus; others show the Eleusinian heroes Iacchus, Eubouleus, and Ploutus; and two show Hecate. There are also fragments from two marble torches. By the second century BC, the priestesses of Demeter and Kore had the right to erect a painted portrait of themselves in the temple of Demeter and Kore.

=== Administration ===
The administration of the Eleusinion was regulated by the Athenian state and the clans of the Eumolpidae and Kerykes. The highest-ranking officials were the priestess of Demeter and Kore and the hierophant, both of whom came from the Eumolpid clan and held office for life.

Andocides says that regulations for the Eleusinion were included in the mid-sixth century BC laws of Solon. Literary sources and inscriptions make regular references to regulations and ritual norms. These regulations tend to treat the City Eleusinion, a smaller Eleusinion at Phalerum, and the sanctuary of Demeter and Kore at Eleusis as a single unit. The surviving inscribed regulations from the City Eleusinion are:

- IG I^{3} 231–232, ca. 510-500 BC, apparently consolidating earlier regulations;
- IG I^{3} 6, ca. 475-450 BC, regulating many aspects of the cult;
- I Eleusis 30 ("the Koroibos decree"), ca. 450 BC, on cult finances;
- Agora XVI 56, ca. 350 BC, detailed regulations of all aspects of the cult;
- I Eleusis 250, ca. 100 BC, regulating the Eleusinian procession;
- IG II^{2} 1078, ca. AD 220, regulating the ephebes' participation in the Eleusinian procession

Numerous decrees whose topics touched in Eleusinian matters were also erected in the sanctuary. Thirty such decrees have been found, of which between 17 and 21 are honorific. Most of these belong to the Hellenistic period and honour the organisers of the Eleusinian Mysteries.

In the late fifth and fourth centuries BC, inscribed inventories listing all the cult's assets were erected annually by a board of epistatai, who were responsible for the finances of the Eleusinian cult.

== Excavation history ==
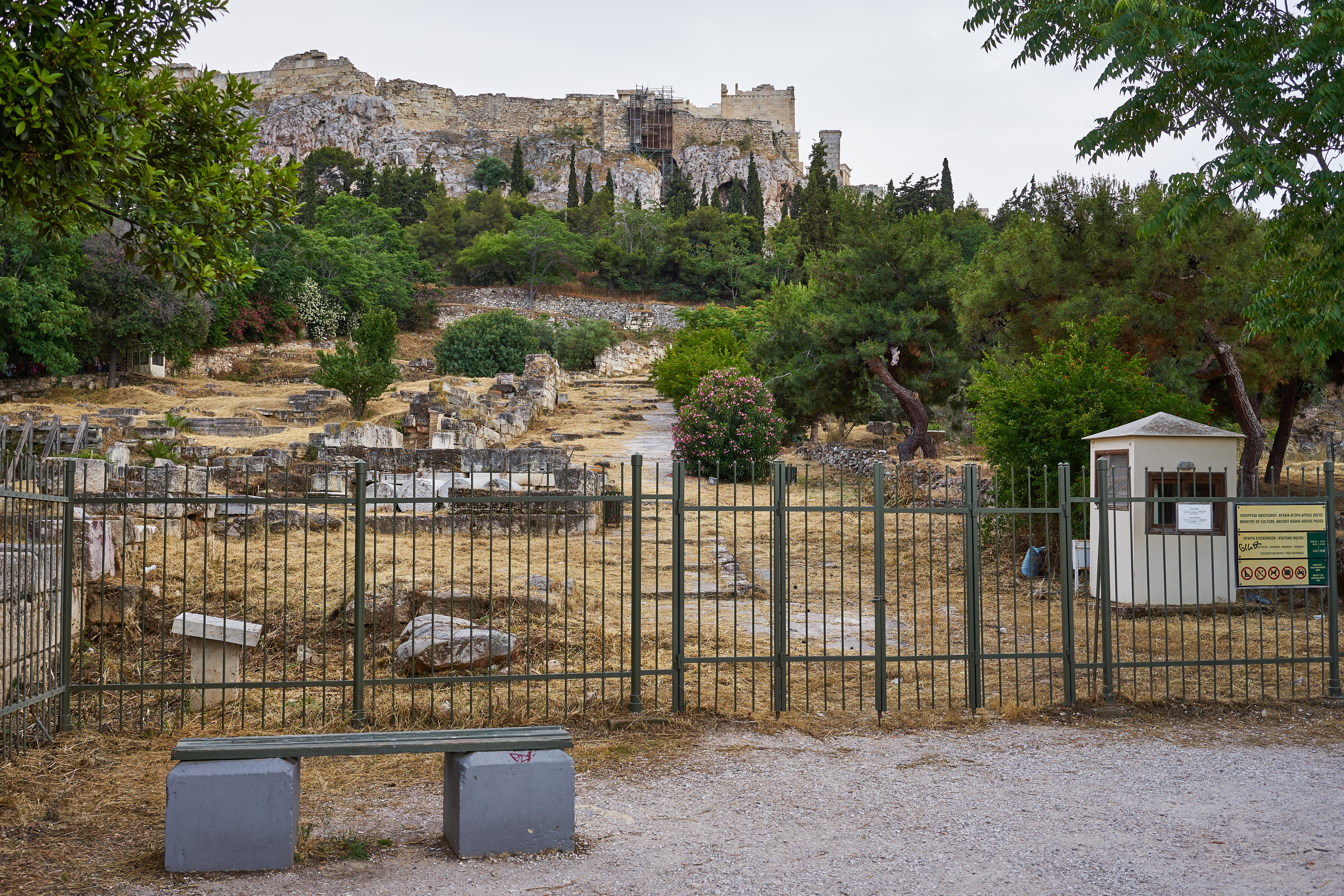
The archaeological site of the Eleusinion, seen from the north

Following the chance discovery of some masonry blocks on 22 June 1848, Kyriakos Pittakis pushed for excavations, eventually undertaking exploratory excavations from 11 to 15 April 1851, which led to larger-scale excavations from 1851 to 1852. Houses were removed and part of the Post-Herulian wall was uncovered (which was largely constructed of classical sculpture, masonry, and inscriptions), as well as the retaining wall above the temple of Triptolemus. Pittakis believed the site was part of the grounds of the Bouleuterion (town council). A minor excavation was undertaken by Konstantinos Kourouniotis in 1910.

The Eleusinion fell within the area purchased by the American School of Classical Studies at Athens for their Agora excavations in the 1930s. Excavations of the area were begun in 1936 and continued until 1939, when they were brought to a close due to the Outbreak of World War II. The leaders of the excavation were Arthur W. Parsons, Margaret Crosby, and Rodney Young. The excavations uncovered the archaic temple, the western propylon, the south stoa in the area of the 19th century excavations and extended further south up the slope and further west across the Panathenaic Way. Discoveries of votive figurines, coins associated with the Eleusinian cult, inscriptions connected with the Eleusinian cult, and especially votive pits full of kernoi led to the identification of the site with the Eleusinion in 1938. The excavations of Section II were particularly disrupted by the war; most of the finds were left unlabelled and unsorted. Near three-quarters of pottery finds proved unsalvagable.

A final set of excavations was undertaken in 1959-1960 by Eugene Vanderpool. Four houses were demolished to extend the excavated area to the east. William Bell Dinsmoor and Margaret Miles carried out surveys in 1980-1981 and Miles restudied the pottery finds, which enable the dating of the site's phases, between 1988 and 1992.

== Bibliography ==
- Miles, Margaret M. (1998). The Athenian Agora XXXI: The City Eleusinion. pp. iii–233. doi:10.2307/3602016. ISSN 1558-8610. JSTOR 3602016.
- Clinton, Kevin (1997). "Eleusis and the Romans: Late Republic to Marcus Aurelius". In Hoff, Michael C.; Rotroff, Susan I. (eds.). The romanization of Athens: proceedings of an international conference held at Lincoln, Nebraska (April 1996). Oxford: Oxbow books. pp. 161–182. ISBN 1900188511.
- Pollitt, Jerome J. (1979). "Kernoi from the Athenian Agora". Hesperia: The Journal of the American School of Classical Studies at Athens. 48 (3): 205–233. doi:10.2307/147978. ISSN 0018-098X. JSTOR 147978.
