= Cave of Pan =

The Cave of Pan can refer to several caves where the god Pan was venerated in classical antiquity:

== Greece ==
- The Cave of Pan within the Cave Sanctuaries of the Acropolis of Athens, in Attica
- The Cave of Pan at Oinoe near Marathon in Attica
- The Corycian Cave on Mount Parnassus in Central Greece
- The Daphni Cave at Daphni Monastery near Athens in Attica
- The Phyle Cave on Mount Parnes near Fyli (Phyle) in Attica
- The Vari Cave on Mount Hymettus near Vari in Attica
- The Cave of Pan at Thasos

== Other countries ==
- The Cave of Pan at Banias in the Golan Heights
