= Cave Sanctuaries of the Acropolis of Athens =

Caves in the rock of the Acropolis of Athens

Coordinates: 37°58′17″N 23°43′41″E

The Cave Sanctuaries of the Acropolis of Athens are the natural fissures in the rock of the Acropolis hill that were used as sites of worship for deities of the Panhellenic pantheon in antiquity. Traditionally a sharp distinction has been drawn between the state religion practised on the summit of the Acropolis and the cult practice of the shrines on the lower slopes. Recently, however, interest has burgeoned in the individual religious experience or personal piety in Greek society of which these cult sites may be the expression. The proceeding description follows the order of the shrines from the Klepsydra at the northwest face of the Acropolis clockwise via the Peripatos round to the foot of the Nike bastion.

== Terrace of Zeus, Apollo and Pan ==
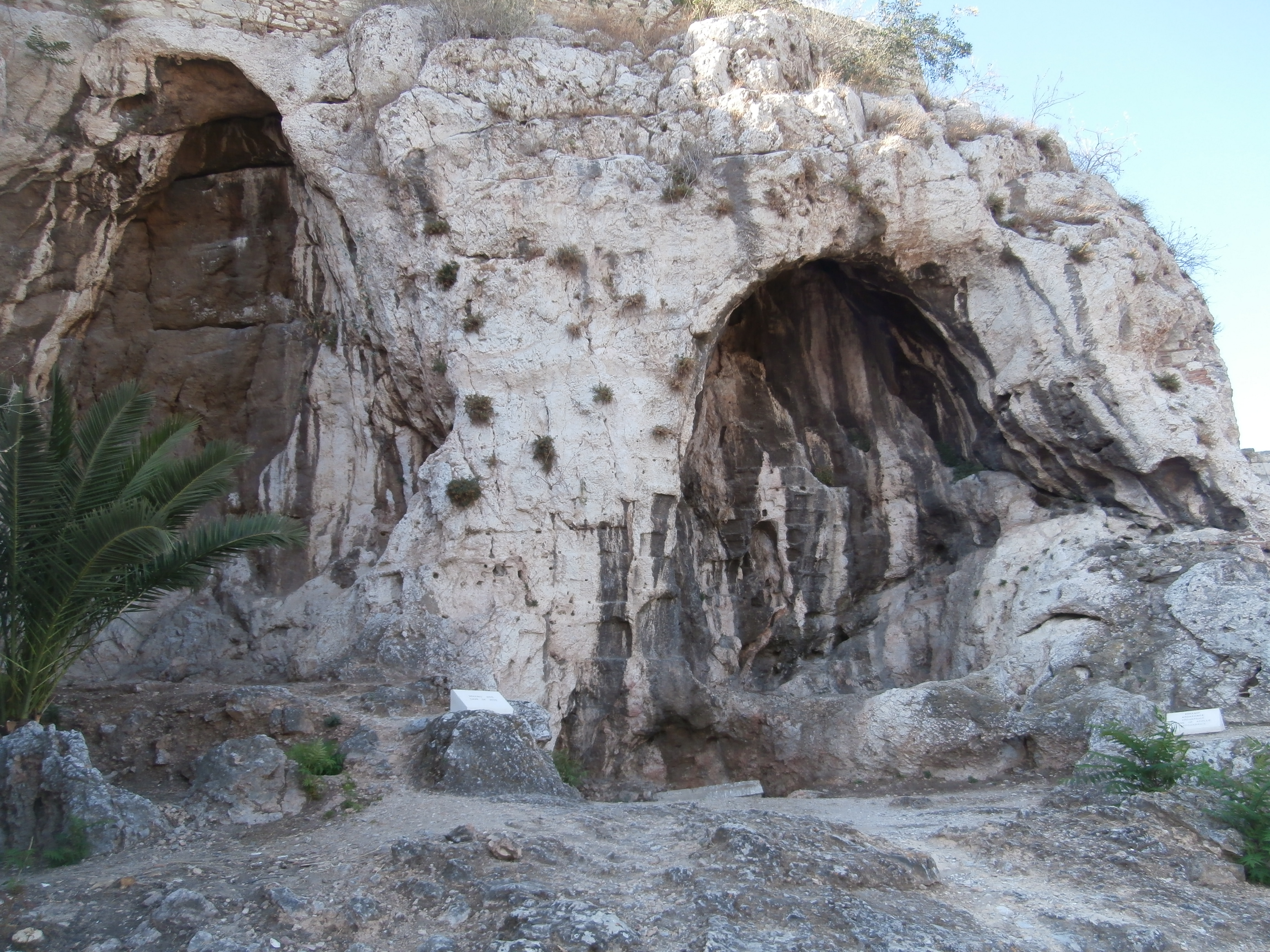
Cave sanctuaries of Zeus and Apollo

The northwestern slope of the rock of the Acropolis is dominated by three cave openings dedicated to the worship of Pan, Zeus and Apollo respectively. The most westerly cave on the terrace is not a shrine but a sculpted cavity, called cave A in the archaeological literature, with a carved surface in the form of a podium was used as a viewing area for the Panathenaic procession. Moving easterly the next cave along, cave B, is that of the Apollo Hypoakraios / Hypo Makrois (Apollo under the High / Long Rocks, also worshipped as Pythios). Here, according to tradition, Apollo was united with Erechtheus' daughter Kreousa. From that liaison Ion, the Athenian hero, was born. The sanctuary was identified after finding marble plaques nearby which detail a crown and an inscription that they were a dedication to Apollo from the nine archons.

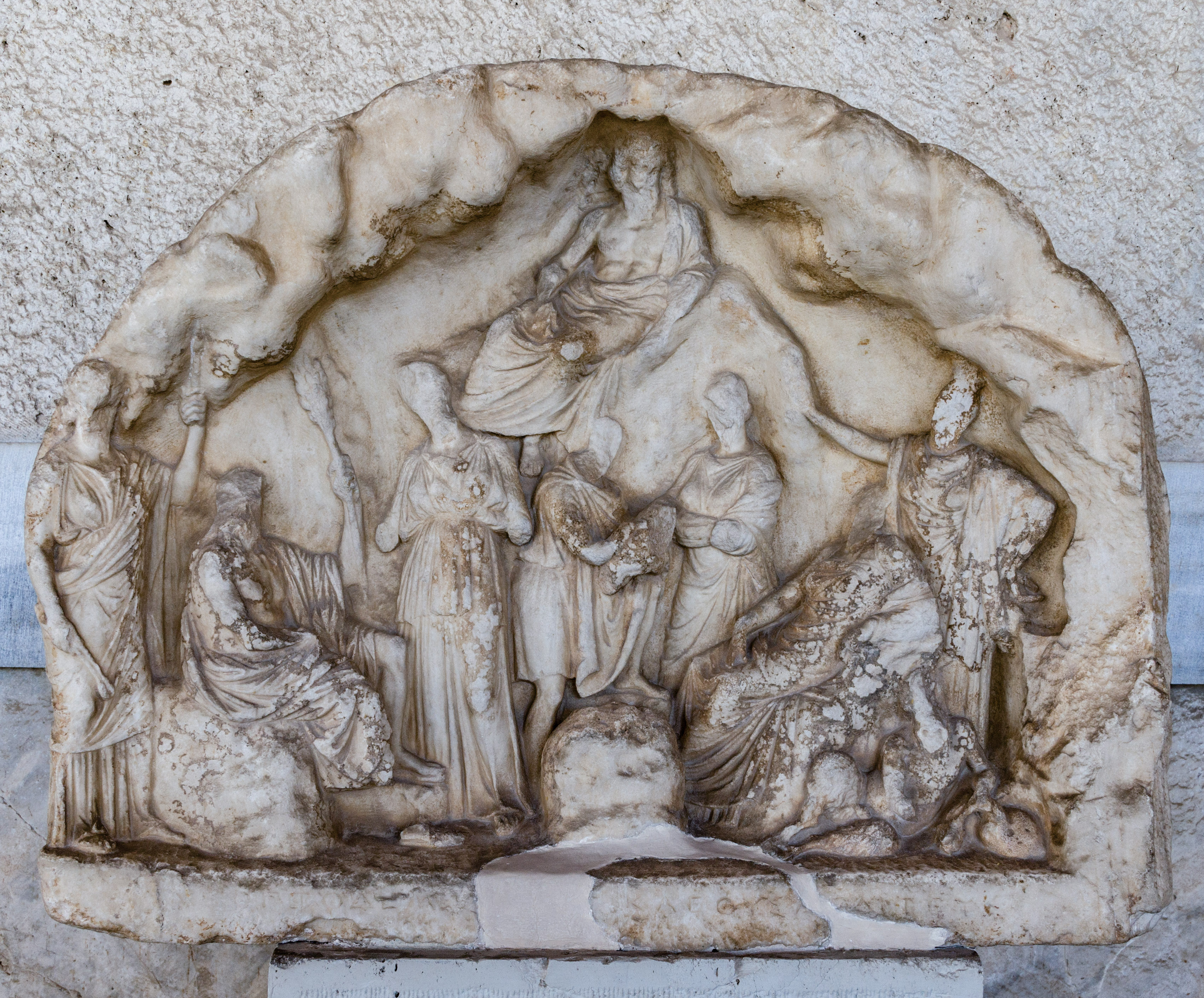
Pan relief, Agora Museum

The Middle Cave, also called cave C in the archaeological literature, is dated to the 5th century and attributed to Zeus Olympios or Zeus Keraunios, based on the interpretations of Thucydides and Strabo.

The excavation of Kavvadias in 1896–1897 uncovered a previously unknown cave system (identified as D-D_{1}, and latterly another, D_{2}), this easternmost cave on the terrace was dedicated to the god Pan. According to tradition, the God contributed to the victory of the Greeks in the battle of Marathon in 490 BCE. by causing panic and fear amongst the Persians. The Athenians returned their gratitude to the God by establishing his worship in the city. The sanctuary was tripartite in form with carved niches for the reception of votives. The identification of the sanctuary was based on the testimonies of Euripides, Aristophanes and Pausanias as well as the finding of two votive reliefs on the site one of which depicts the God sitting on a rock playing the pipes while a nymph stands before him, and the other is the Pan Relief which shows the God amongst other deities. In the Christian period, the furthest eastern part of the Sanctuary (named cave D_{2}) was converted into a chapel dedicated to Saint Athanasius from which traces of frescoes in the niches are preserved today. Next to this cave is a narrow stairway that leads up to the Acropolis.

== Terrace of Aphrodite and Eros ==
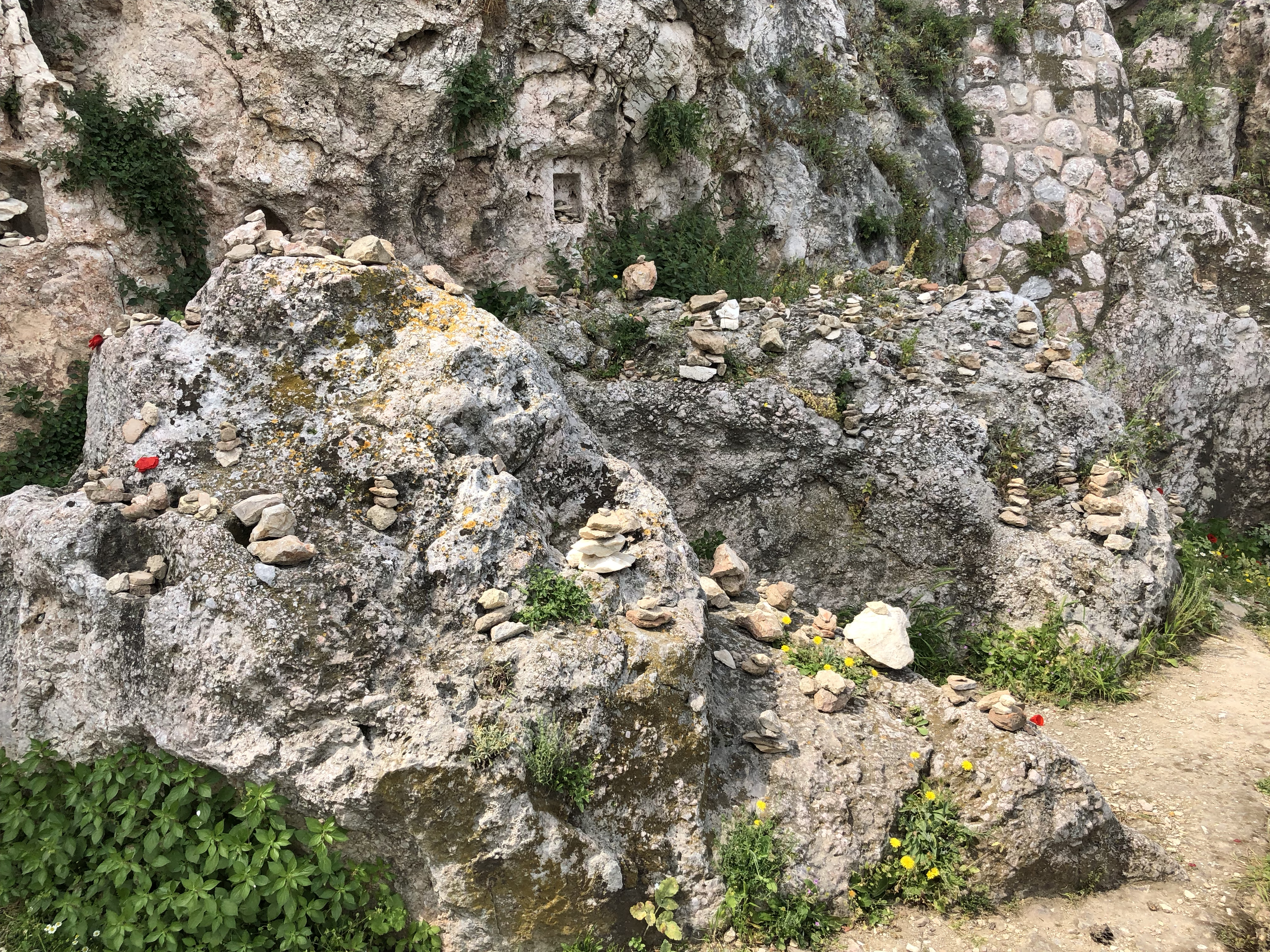
Sanctuary of Aphrodite and Eros

Further along the Peripatos, a narrow path leads up to a terrace 30m x 14m with an open air sanctuary. It was excavated by Oscar Broneer in 1932 who identified the site with Aphrodite and Eros. Also identified as the shrine of Aphrodite in the Gardens after the passage in Pausanias describing the rites of the arrhephoroi. The cave is divided in two by a wall into the so-called eastern and middle sanctuaries. A number of votive niches are carved into the back wall which probably housed statues or other votive gifts the evidence of these mostly date from the 2nd or 3rd centuries BCE, oldest find is 5th century. Also found were small marble reliefs of male and female genitals, fragments of a marble relief of nine Erotes carrying cult paraphernalia from the late 4th century.

Two inscriptions of circa 450–430 BCE were cut into the rock at the southwest corner of the site, One a dedication to Aphrodite, the other mentions a spring festival sacred to Eros. A marble thesaurus of the 4th century BCE was found 100m downslope of the shrine, inscribed “Treasury for prenuptial offerings to Aphrodite Ourania, it testifies to a private sacrifice rather than a public ritual. The connection to the passage in Pausanias already mentioned was made by Broneer who suggest that the arrhephoroi might have descended from the Acropolis through the adjacent Mycenaean well, however there is no definite evidence of this still mysterious ceremony. The small area next to the Aphrodite temenos, the so-called skyphoi sanctuary, the purpose of which is unclear was the site of deposit of a large number of small vessels.

== Aglaureion ==
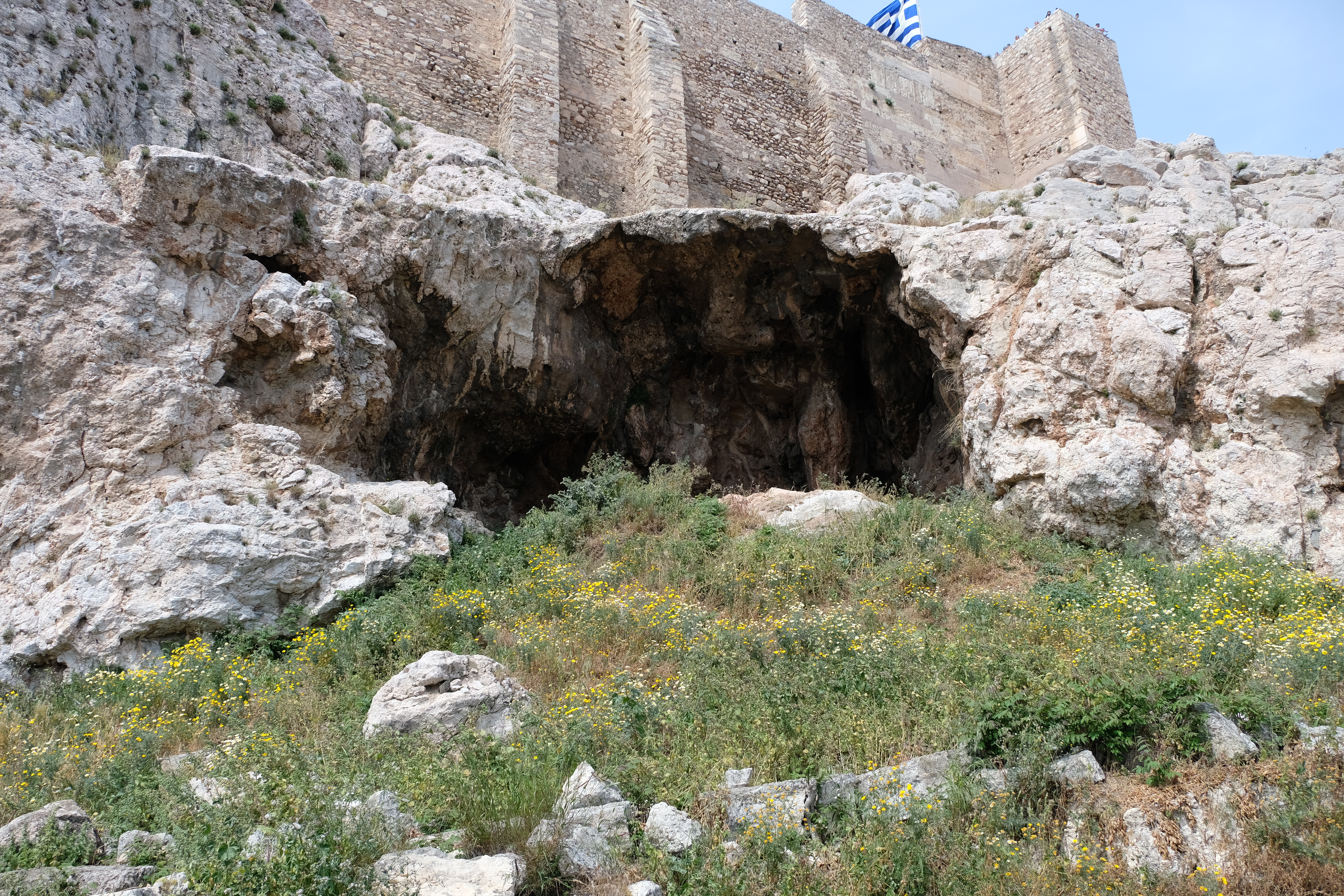
Aglaureion

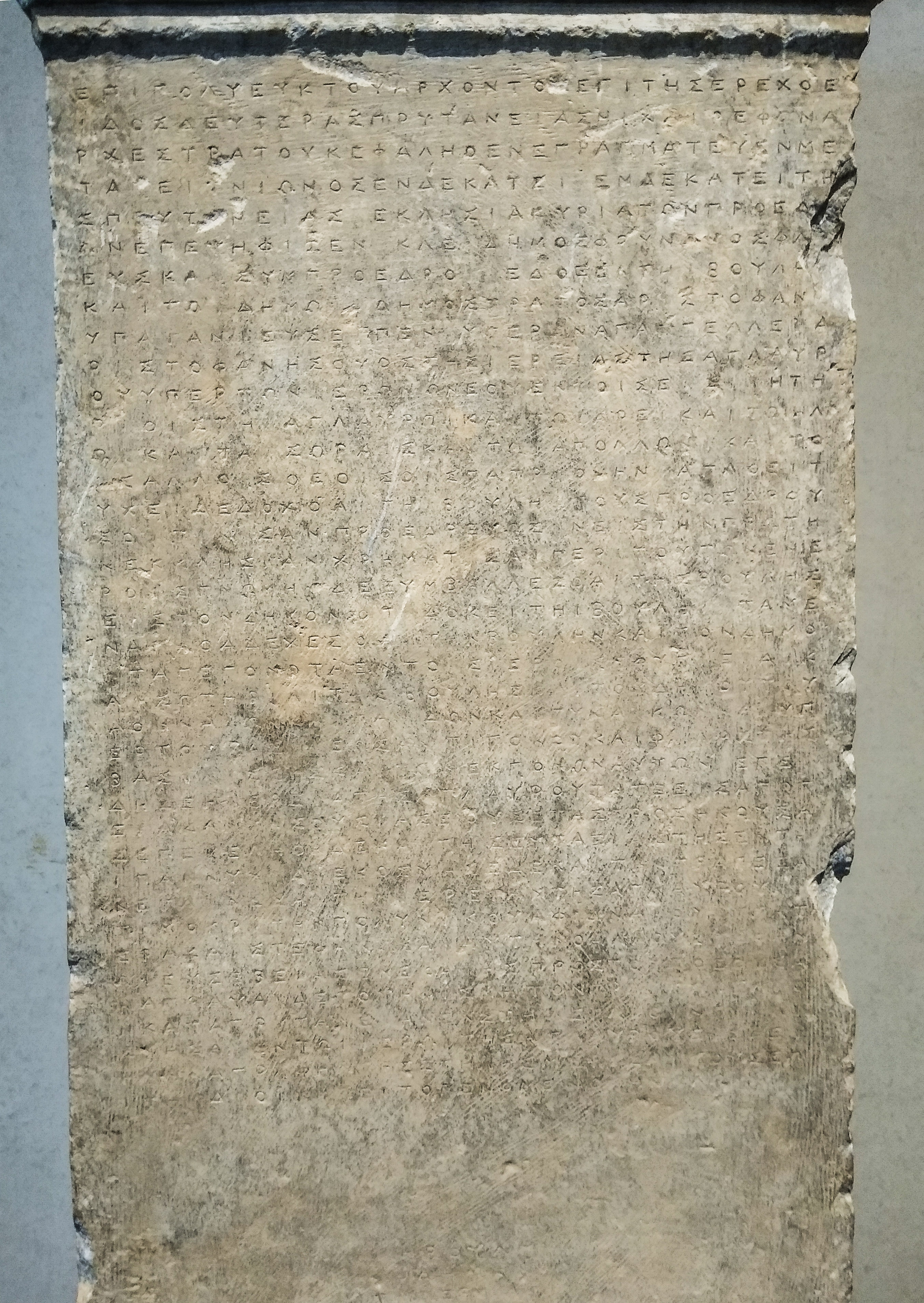
Stele SEG 33:115, Acropolis Museum, Akr 13372.

On the east slope is the Aglaureion, the largest of the Acropolis caves at 14m across the mouth. Aglauros was one of the daughters of Cecrops, who according to legend jumped to her death to save the city as decreed by the Delphic oracle. Herodotus records that the Persians in 480 BCE used this part of the hill to scale the Acropolis. Pausanias described the Aglaureion as being above the sanctuary of the Dioskouroi near the Prytaneion. These sources were the only inconclusive clues to the location of the shrine which was not identified as its current site until the 1980 stele find. Dating from 247/6 or 246/5 BCE, the inscription on the stele mentions the Aglauros priestess Timokrite, who was honoured by the Athenian demos with this memorial. This stele was part of the peribolos (encircling wall) of the sanctuary. While the cult of Aglauros was a women's cult, the ephebes also practised the Aglauria there when they swore oaths and received their weapons. The inscription as refers to a pannykhis (an all-night vigil) as part of the festival.

== Pan, Nymphs, Hermes, Isis, Themis ==
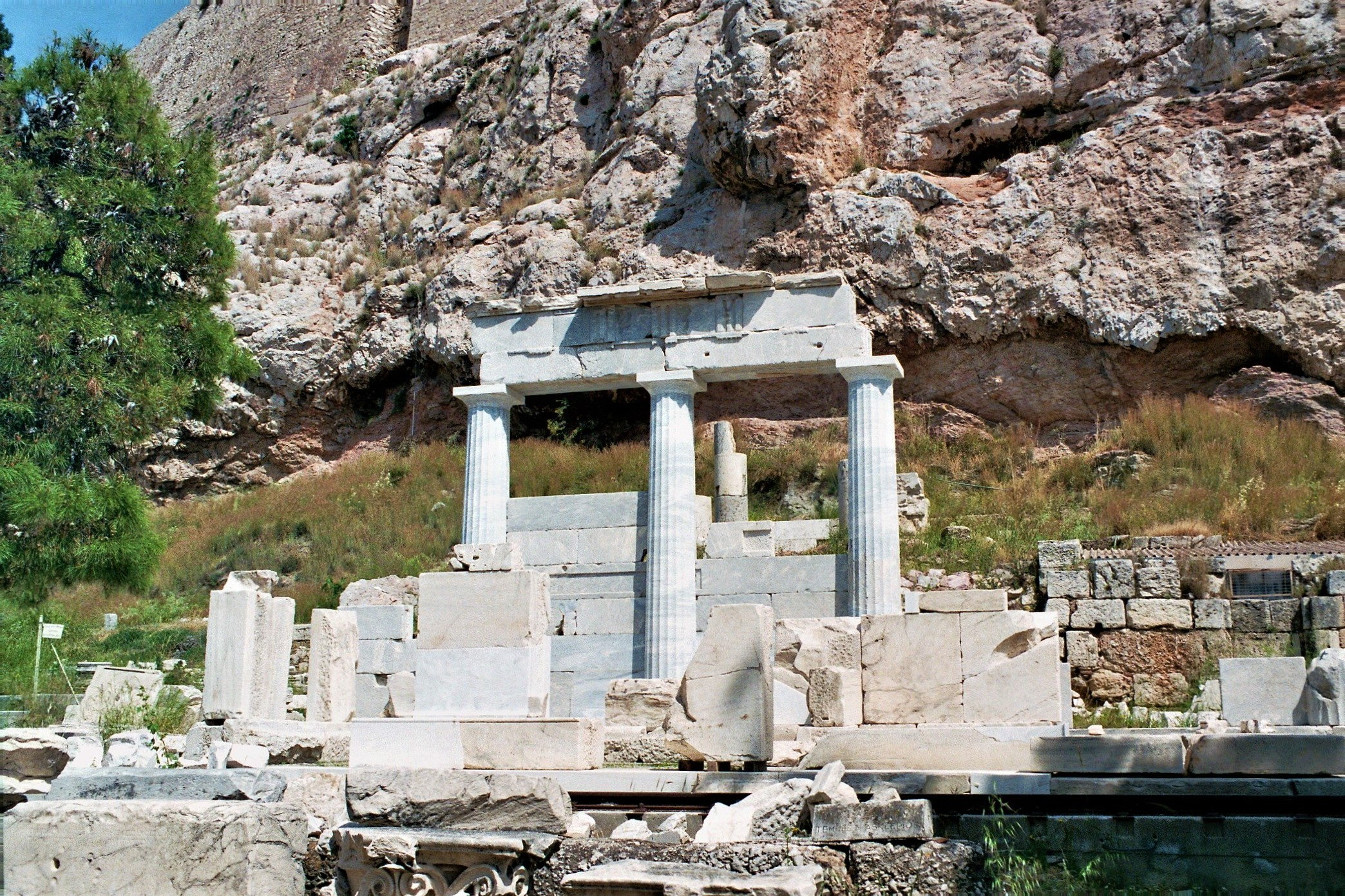
The Asklepieion of Athens

Turning to the south slope of the hill are the major religious sites of the sanctuaries of Dionysos and Asklepios. Beyond these lies a terrace west of the Asklepieion where there are a number of smaller sanctuaries. The Mycenaean spring on this site had been enclosed in a spring house since the archaic period and had been a centre for the cult of Pan, the nymphs and possibly Hermes since the 5th century BCE. Its boundary was indicated by a horos built into the wall that defined the Peripatos. Susan Walker identified this as a state cult. A 1st century BCE inscription found in the location mentions Hermes, Pan, Aphrodite, the Nymphs and Isis. Additionally a small temple in antis dating from the 2nd century CE is identified with Isis which according to epigraphic evidence was restored by a private patron. Pausanias describes a temple of Themis here directly behind a monument for the hero Hippolytus, several Roman inscriptions denote Themis as the epiclesis of different goddesses. Finally there are votive niches in bedrock west of the Asklepieion. This ad hoc development does suggest that this was a site of private pilgrimage rather than public ritual. Pala considers that the Aphrodite shrines of south slope may have been part of a pilgrimage trail, along with the Aphrodite cave on the north face where the goddess was worshipped in her kourotrophic aspect, that brides and wives might have taken.

== Nymphe Sanctuary ==
The Sanctuary of the Nymphe is an open air sanctuary south of the later Herodeion. It is not accessible from the Peripatos. The temple was excavated in 1955–60, when a variety of evidence of use was uncovered including a horos inscribed “boundary of the sanctuary of Nymphe”, and a large number of loutrophoroi, the majority of which were black-figure dating to the 6th century. Nymphe is an obscure figure in the pantheon who was protector of marriage and wedding ceremonies. The site comprised an altar, an oval peribolos and an apsidal structure over the altar. The loutrophoros was used by suppliants to carry water from the Kallirrhoe spring near the Ilissos river for the prenuptial bath of the bride. This procession was called the loutrophoria. The sanctuary lasted until the 1st century CE when the precinct was destroyed.

== Aphrodite Pandemos, Peitho, Ge Kourotrophos, Demeter Chloe ==
It is a point of contention whether the south slope hosted one or two shrines to Aphrodite. Besides Aphrodite Hippolytos already mentioned, it may be the case that the cult of Aphrodite Pandemos was located above the Herodeion. Pausanias lists her sanctuary along with Peitho (Goddess of Persuasion) as being west of the Asklepieion. On this terrace, which stretches to the Nike bastion, Pausanias also locates shrines to Ge Kourotrophos and Demeter Chloe. Here some pottery fragments and figurines associated with Aphrodite have been found. The other ascriptions, however, remain inconclusive.

== Bibliography ==
- Broneer, Oscar (1932). "Eros and Aphrodite on the North Slope of the Acropolis in Athens". Hesperia. 1: 31–55. doi:10.2307/146474. JSTOR 146474.
- Broneer, Oscar (1933). "Excavations on the North Slope of the Acropolis in Athens, 1931-1932". Hesperia. 2 (3): 329–417. doi:10.2307/146642. JSTOR 146642.
- Broneer, Oscar (1935). "Excavations on the North Slope of the Acropolis in Athens, 1933-1934". Hesperia. 4 (2): 109–188. doi:10.2307/146636. JSTOR 146636.
- Broneer, Oscar (1937). "Excavations on the North Slope of the Acropolis". Hesperia. 7 (2): 161–263. doi:10.2307/146626. JSTOR 146626.
- Dontas, G. (1983). "The True Aglaurion". Hesperia. 52: 48–63. doi:10.2307/147737. JSTOR 147737.
- Friese, Wiebke (2019). "On the Peripatos: Accessibility and Topography of the Acropolis Slope Sanctuaries". In Friese, W.; Handberg, S.; Kristensen, T.M. (eds.). Ascending and descending the Acropolis: Movement in Athenian Religion. Aarhus.
- Graf, Fritz (1999). Magic in the Ancient World. Harvard.
- Pala, Elisabetta (2010). "Aphrodite on the Akropolis: Evidence from Attic Pottery". In Smith, Amy C.; Pickup, Sadie (eds.). Brill's Companion to Aphrodite. Brill.
- Parker, R. (2005). Polytheism and Society at Athens. Oxford.
- Travlos, J. (1971). Pictorial Dictionary of Ancient Athens. Thames & Hudson.
