= Peripatos (Acropolis of Athens) =

Ancient pathway

Coordinates: 37°58′18″N 23°43′43″E

The dotted line represents the Peripatos. It begins at the Klepsydra (29), bisects the teatron of the Theatre of Dionysos (23), continues between the Stoa of Eumenes (21) and the sanctuary of Asklepios (22), goes behind the Herodeion and finishes at the Beulé Gate (19).

The Peripatos (Ancient Greek: περίπατος, lit. 'walkway') is an ancient pathway that girds the Acropolis in Athens and intersects with the Panathenaic Way on the north slope. It connects the shrines that are interspersed around the Acropolis hill. A reading of Thucydides 2.17, which records that the shrines were erected within an area which it was forbidden to build or quarry called the Pelasgian ground, suggests that the peripatos follows the line of the archaic and now vanished Pelasgic wall.

An inscription on a boulder of acropolis limestone from the north slope of the hill is the only epigraphic evidence of the pathway. It reads "Length of the Peripatos: five stades and eighteen feet." This inscription is dated to the fourth century BCE, though it is possible that the path had been cleared and in use at least since the Periklean building programme by when the cave sanctuaries had been established. Pausanias in the second century CE makes mention of using the road to examine the klepsydra and the Apollo cave.

Work was undertaken to restore the Peripatos beginning in 1977.

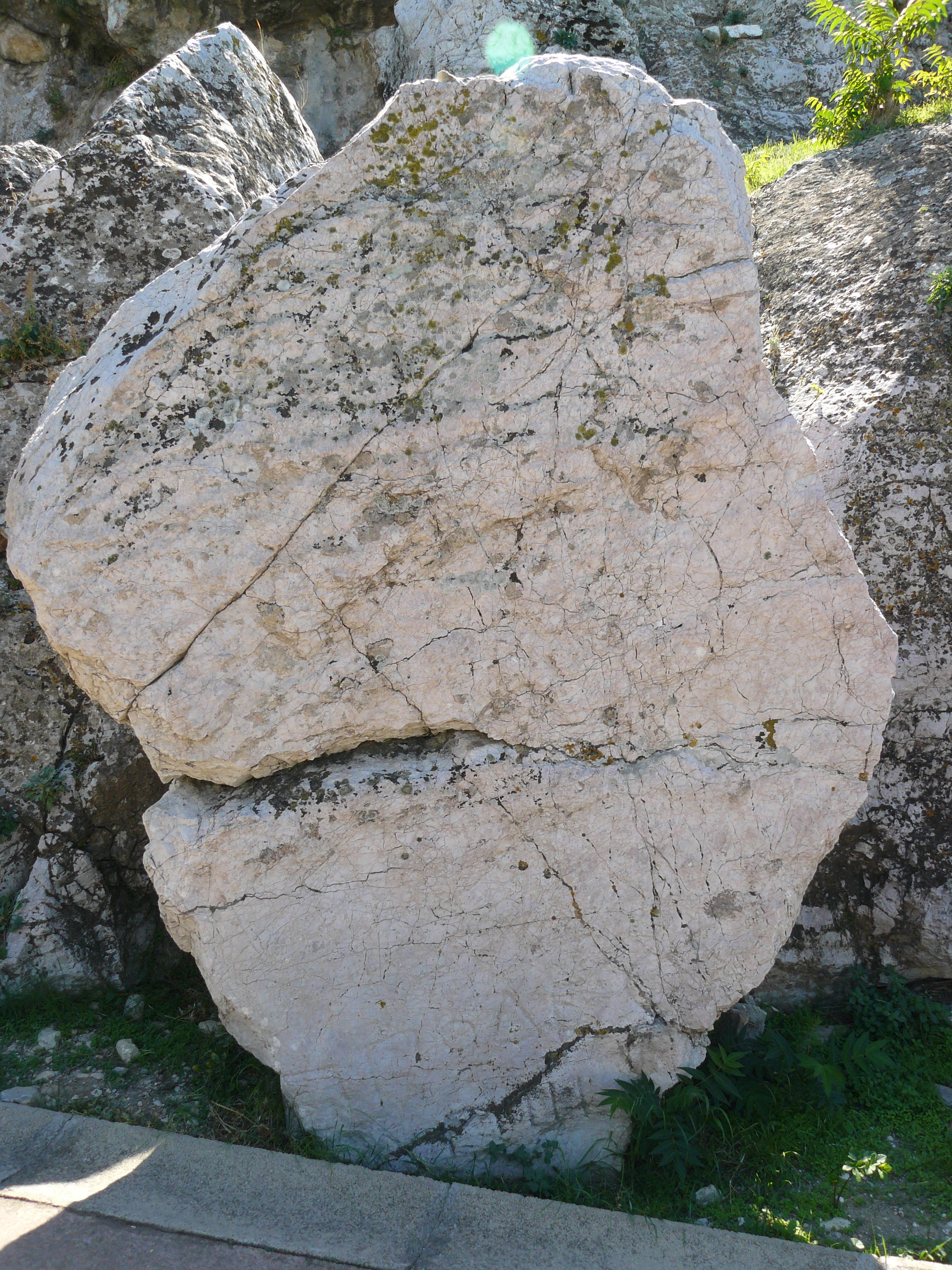
Inscribed boulder

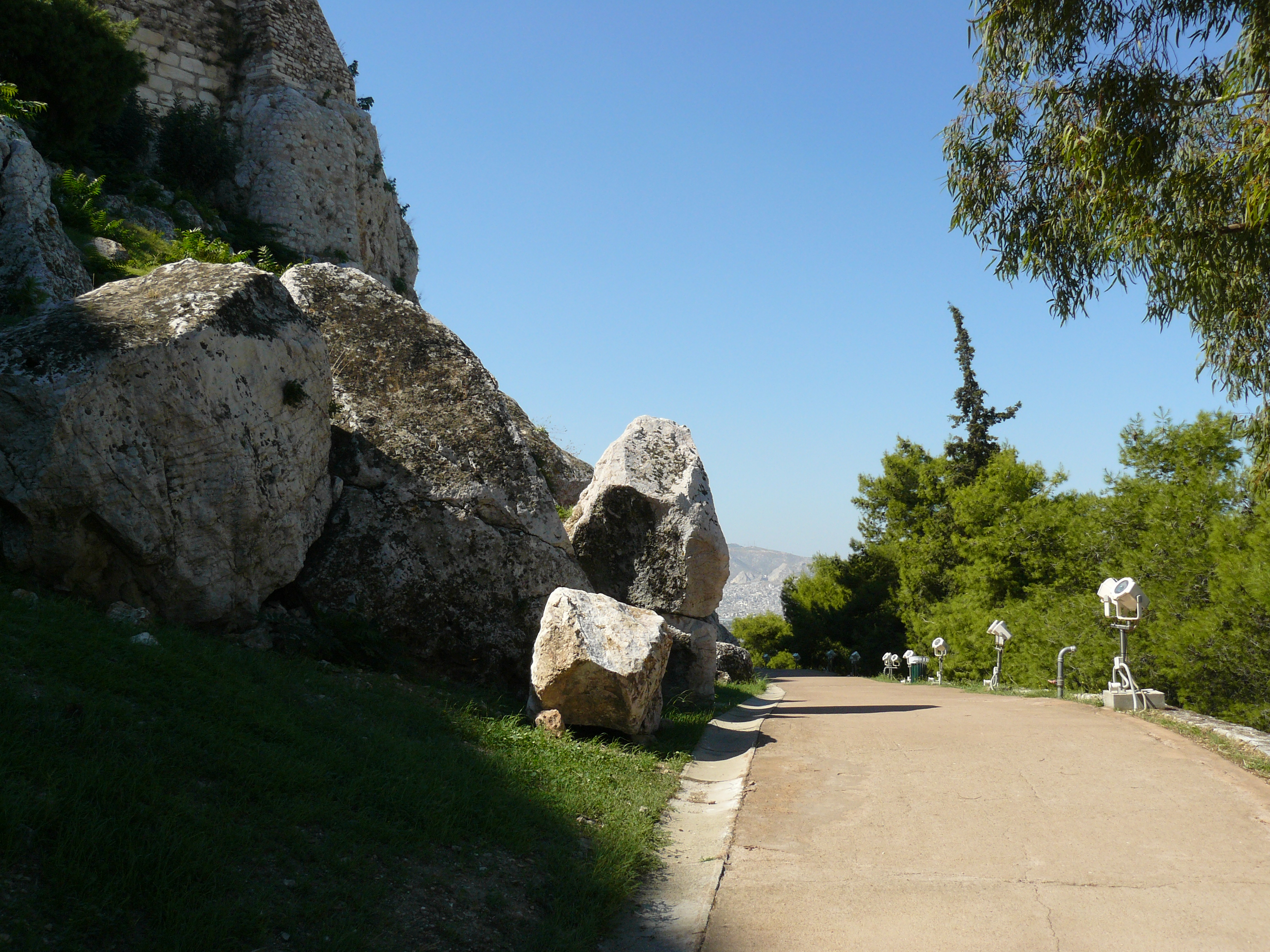
View of the Peripatos

== See also ==
- Landscaping of the Acropolis of Athens

== Bibliography ==
- R. E. Wycherley, The Stones of Athens, 1978.
- J. M. Camp. The Archaeology of Athens, 2001.
- J. Travlos, Pictorial dictionary of Ancient Athens, 1970.
- Weibke Friese, On the Peripatos: Accessibility and Topography of the Acropolis Slope Sanctuaries in Ascending and descending the Acropolis: Movement in Athenian Religion, edited by Wiebke Friese, Soren Handberg, Troels Myrup Kristensen, 2019.
