= Sanctuary of Aphrodite Pandemos =

The Sanctuary of Aphrodite Pandemos was an ancient sanctuary dedicated to Aphrodite Pandemos and Peitho on the southwest slope of the Acropolis hill in Athens, Greece.

As its name suggests, the sanctuary was connected to the cult of Aphrodite Pandemos, or "Aphrodite of all the people", which Theseus is said to have founded after uniting the villages of Attica into the city of Athens, as well as to the cult of the personification of Peitho, or Persuasion. The sanctuary may actually date back to Solon's archaic period in the 6th century BC. The sanctuary was used, among other things, for the Aphrodisia festival, when pigeons consecrated to Aphrodite were sacrificed there.

According to Pausanias, the sanctuary was located in the area between the Asklepieion and the Propylaia. The sanctuary has been located on the slope of the Acropolis below the temple of Athene Nike based on, among other things, the hieroglyphs found in the area and other remains, such as parts of the frieze. The preserved remains of the sanctuary date from the early Hellenistic period.
