= Pan's Cave (Haidari) =

Cave in Haidari, Attica, Greece

Coordinates: 38.0112°N 23.6312°E

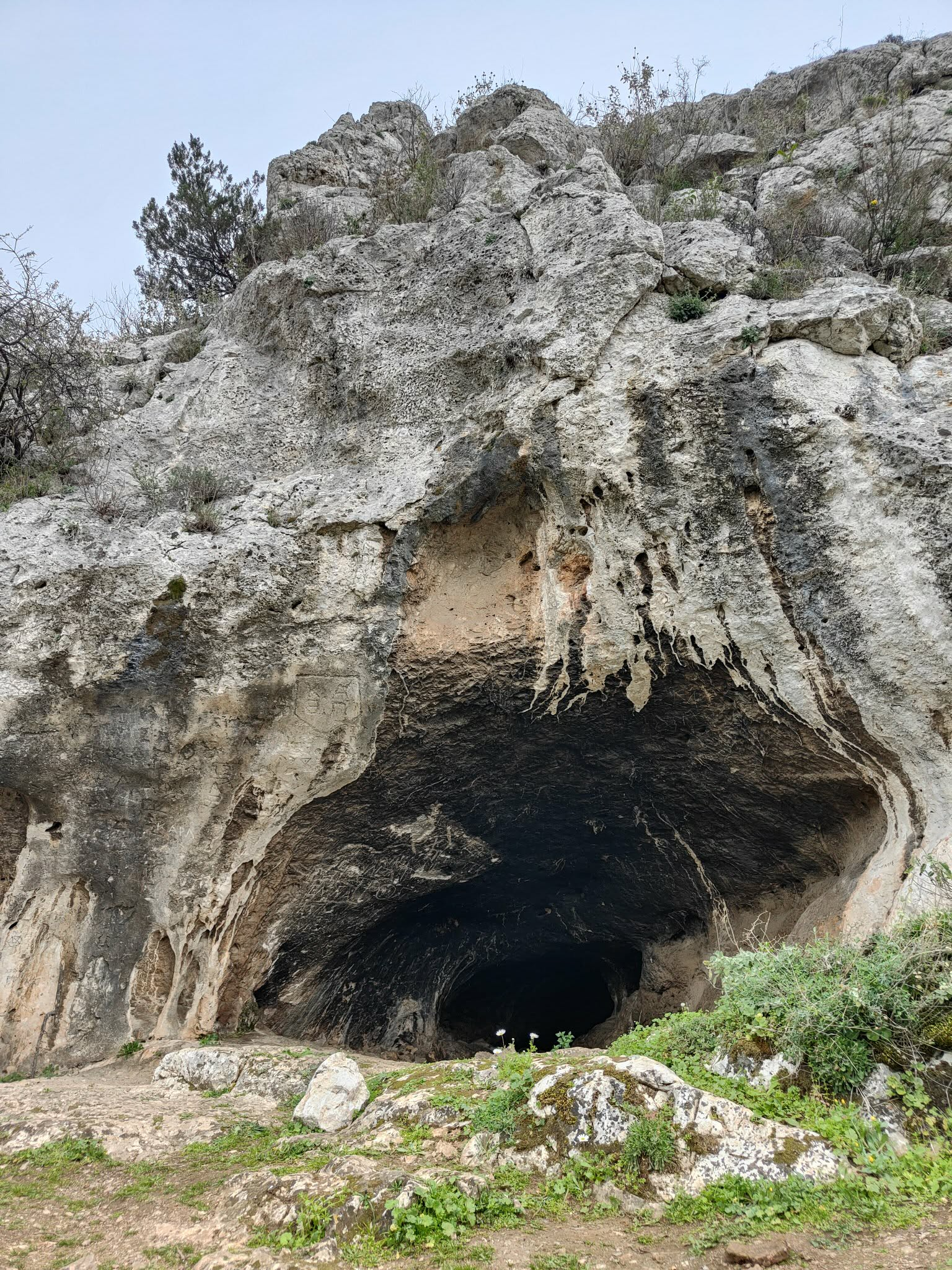
Entrance of Pan's Cave (in Haidari)

The cave of God Pan in Daphni is a cave in Haidari, Attica, Greece, that was sacred to the god Pan. It is located near the Byzantine monastery. The cave is believed to have been used for rituals, including burnt offerings and animal sacrifices dedicated.

The cave has a conical shape, with a depth of about 11.55 meters, an opening width of 7.8 meters, and an opening height of 3.4 meters, and the opening is facing north. During the ancient times, with a doorway serving as the access point to the cave. In front of this wall was a flat forecourt extending approximately 2 meters.

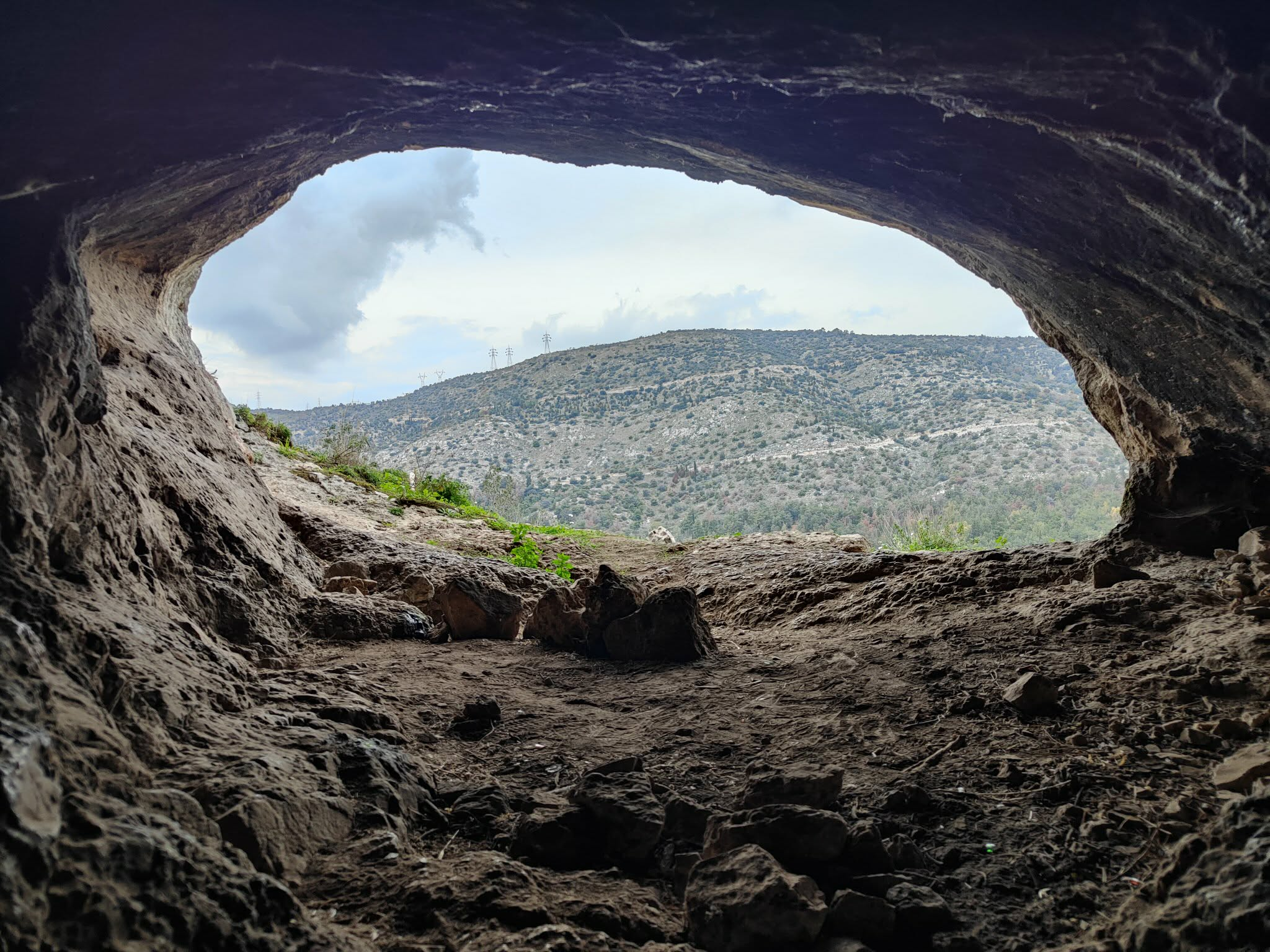
View of the cave entrance from the interior

Although the cave was formed naturally, some remodelling appears to have taken place after caves began to be used as places of worship, around the 5th century BCE. The cave appears to have been of more limited cultic importance than other sanctuaries in Attica.

== History ==
(Source:, unless otherwise stated)

The cave is of natural origin and was used in the ancient times. It was discovered shortly after 1980 by Dimitrios Kambouroglou, during his investigations on the ancient Sacred Way. The first study of the cave in modern times began on 25 March 1932, by the Greek architect and archaeologist Ioannis Travlos. During the 1932 investigation, animal bones - including burnt remains and fragments of goat horns - were found, along with shells, pottery fragments, clay figurines, and intact clay lamp, and ash from hearth activity. Most of the pots fragments were from loutrophoros pots. The clay figurines depict the god Pan, the goddess Aphrodite, Silenoi (mythological demons associated with flowing water and the earth fertility, and companions of god Dionysus), as well as several female figures.

Most of the ancient artifacts were buried under a thin layer of dirt and animal faeces. It has been suggested that the accumulated soil may have been intentionally laid to facilitate the movement of animals within the cave. Some Byzantine clay pots pieces were also found. On the roof of the cave was found soot.

The presence of multiple traces of mortar on the side walls and floor of the cave, as well as on the surface of the forecourt, indicates that these surfaces were plastered.

Although the finds were limited in number and significance, they allow the period of active cult use to be identified as extending from the time of the Greco-Persian Wars to shortly thereafter, in the mid- to late 5th century BCE. There is no concrete way to define when the cave was stopped being used, but it is assumed that this happened in the late 5th century BCE, due to the lack of younger artifacts.

The cave’s remote, wooded location supports its identification as a sanctuary of Pan, as such settings were commonly associated with the god and were easily accessible to shepherds and travellers seeking shelter. In addition, some pottery fragments are decorated with scenes suggestive of nymphs, deities closely associated with Pan.

During the early Christian times there are signs that the cave was used again either as a sanctuary, or as a place for eremites, as it was close to the Byzantine monastery. Evidence for later Christian use includes a large painted cross on the left side of the cave interior. In later years, possibly during the Ottoman ruling on Greece, after it was abandoned by the monks, it was used as a temporary sheep stable.
