= Klepsydra (Acropolis) =

Ancient well in Athens Acropolis

Coordinates: 37°58′19″N 23°43′30″E

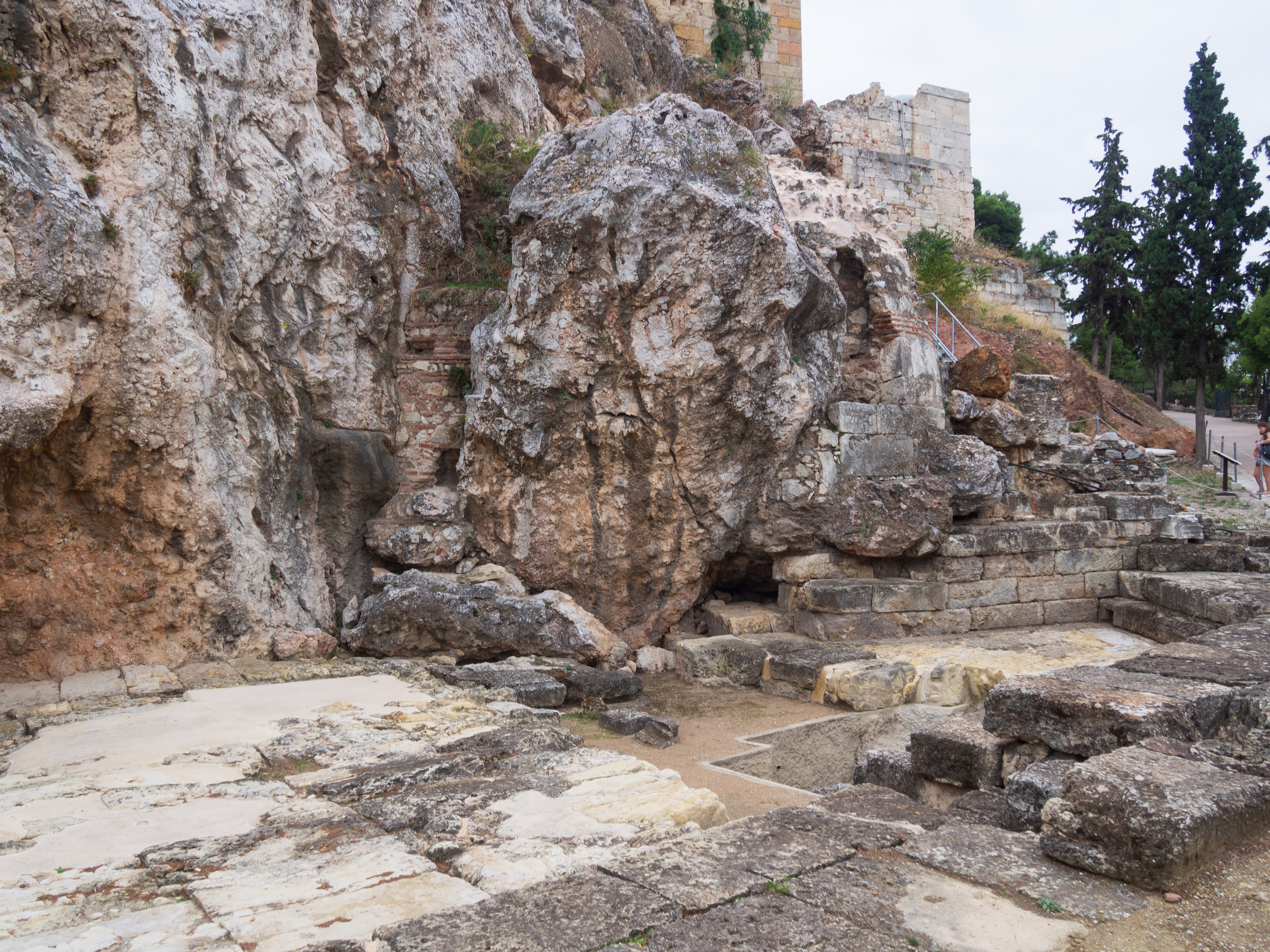
Site of the Klepsydra, Athens

The Klepsydra of the Acropolis of Athens is a natural spring on the north-west slope of the Acropolis hill, near the intersection of the Peripatos and the Panathenaic Way. It had been in use as a source of water since prehistoric times but sometime in the fifth century BCE the site was developed with several new structures built. The site consisted of the paved court, a well, the covered well-house, a later Roman apsidal well house (subsequently a Byzantine chapel) and a flight of stone-carved steps up to the Propylaea. There are several references to the source in ancient literature; Hesychius says of it “Klepsydra is a fountain which was formerly called Empedo”. Empedo, argues Parsons, was the name of the spring and Klepsydra the name given to the water made available by the fountain house. It would seem that Empedo was also the name of the tutelary deity of the spring – an Attic nymph. Mention is also made of the fountain by Aristophanes, Pausanias, and Plutarch.

It was Stuart and Revett who first identified the free-flowing stream on the face of the hill with the klepsydra mentioned by the ancient authors. During the period of Frankish control, the klepsydra was heavily fortified; however, during the long period of Ottoman occupation the well fell into disuse such that the Turkish garrison of the Acropolis was forced to surrender at the siege of 1822 due to the lack of water. Kyriakos Pittakis rediscovered the source of the spring, leaving the first written account of the site in 1835. Archaeological examination began in earnest with Émile Burnouf in 1874, and with later development having been cleared from the site Kavvadias uncovered the paved court in 1897. From 1936 to 1940 the American School of Classical Studies at Athens undertook a campaign of excavation, with this the paved court, fountain house and draw basin were fully exposed. It was from this final excavation that it was determined that the spring house had been set into a natural cave which had collapsed sometime in antiquity. A shaft was then opened into the well directly accessible from the Acropolis and a new well house constructed above in the Roman period. From potsherds recovered it was ascertained that the original Greek fountain house was built not earlier than 475–470 BCE.

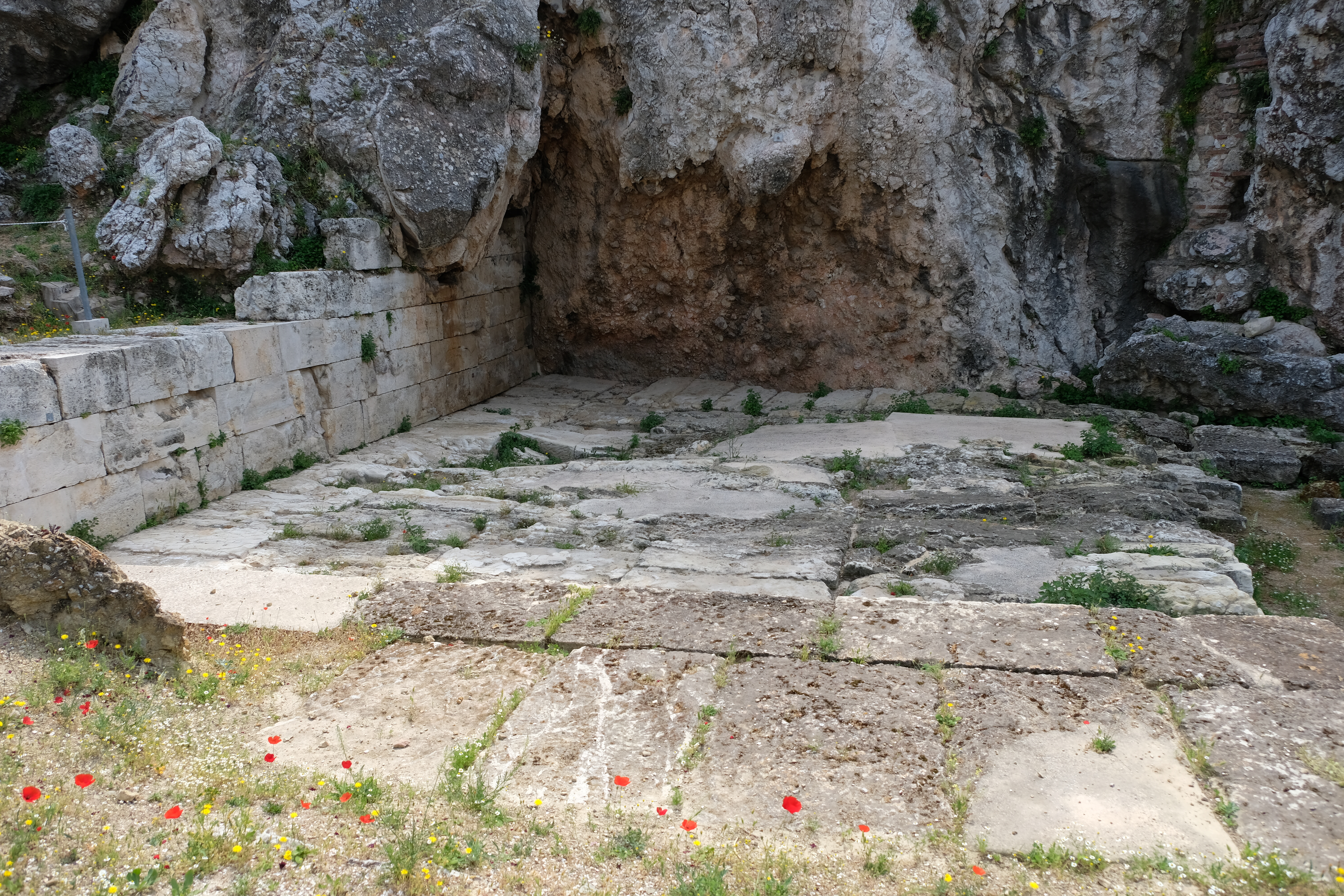
Paved court seen from the Peripatos

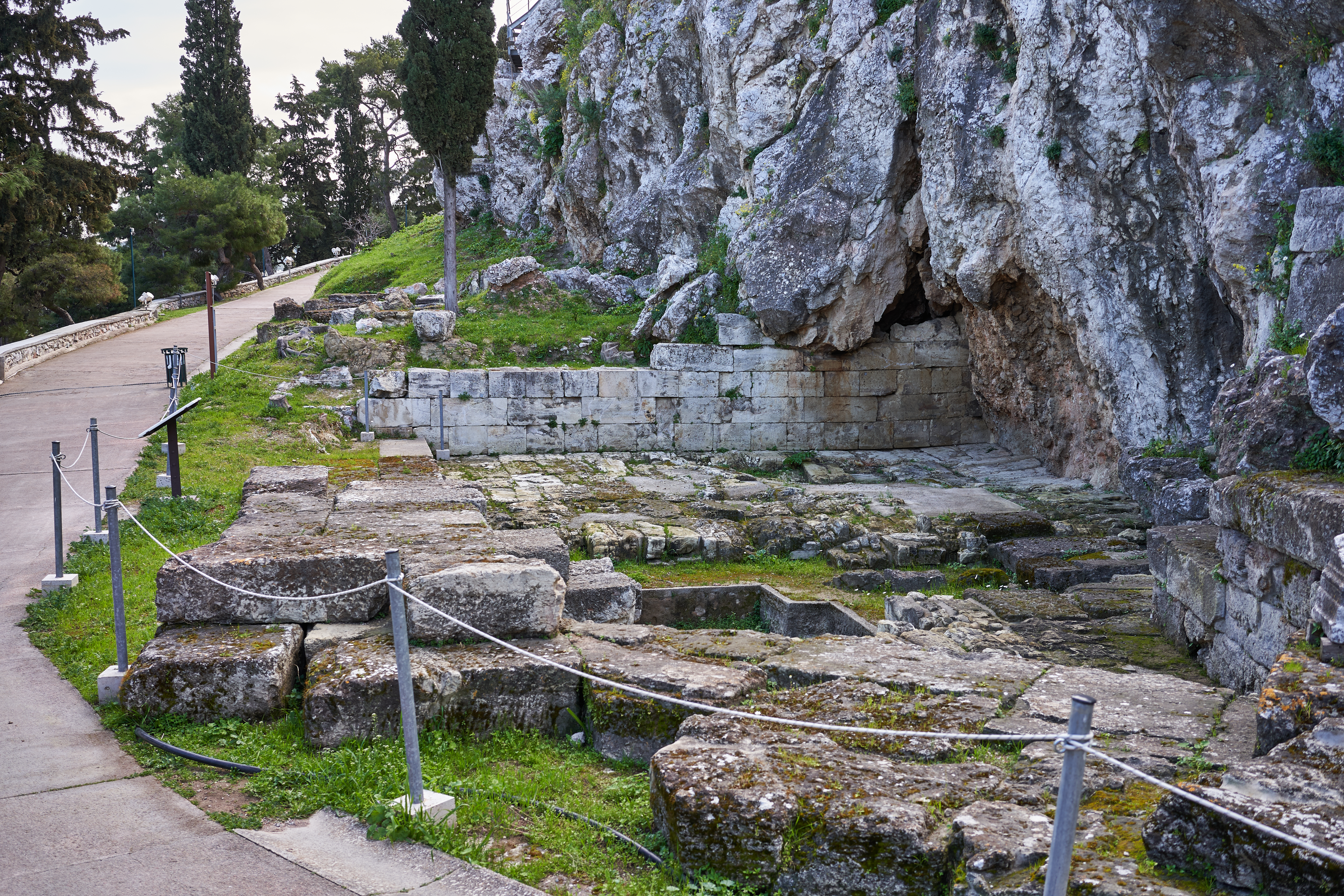
Paved court with draw well

== Bibliography ==
- A. W. Parsons, Klepsydra and the Paved Court of the Pythion, Hesperia, XII, 1943.
- J. M. Camp, Archaeology of Athens, 2001
- J. Travlos, Pictorial Dictionary of Ancient Athens, 1980.
