= Thiersch =

Thiersch is a German surname. People named Thiersch include:

- Friedrich Thiersch (1784–1860), German classicist and philhellene
- Friedrich von Thiersch (1852–1921), German architect and painter
- H. W. J. Thiersch (1817–1885), German theologian in the Catholic Apostolic Church, and son of Friedrich
- Katharina Thiersch (1938–2021), German monument conservator
- Karl Thiersch (1822–1895), German surgeon, and son of Friedrich
- Ludwig Thiersch (1825–1909), Germanpainter, philhellene, and son of Friedrich
- Paul Thiersch (1879–1928), German architect
