= Paul Thiersch =

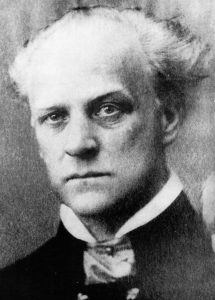
Paul Thiersch (1920s)

Paul Thiersch (2 May 1879, Munich – 15 November 1928, Hannover) was a German architect and designer.

== Life and work ==
He was born to an illustrious family that produced notable people in several fields. His great-grandfather, Friedrich Thiersch was a philologist. His grandfather, H. W. J. Thiersch, was a theologian; brother of the surgeon Karl Thiersch and the artist Ludwig Thiersch. Paul's father, August, and his uncle, Friedrich, were also architects, and his older brother, Hermann, was an archaeologist.

Following his primary education, and a brief stint as a bricklayer, he attended the Zurich University of Applied Sciences from 1897 to 1898, then studied art at the Allgemeine Gewerbeschule Basel from 1900 to 1901. This was followed by three years at the Technical University of Munich, where his instructors included Martin Dülfer and Theodor Fischer. After completing his studies, he found a position with the Munich Building Department. In 1906, he moved to Düsseldorf, where he became Office Manager for the architect and painter, Peter Behrens, but stayed there for only a short time, then went to Berlin; serving in the same position for Bruno Paul and teaching at the Kunstgewerschule. By 1909, he was able to open his own office.

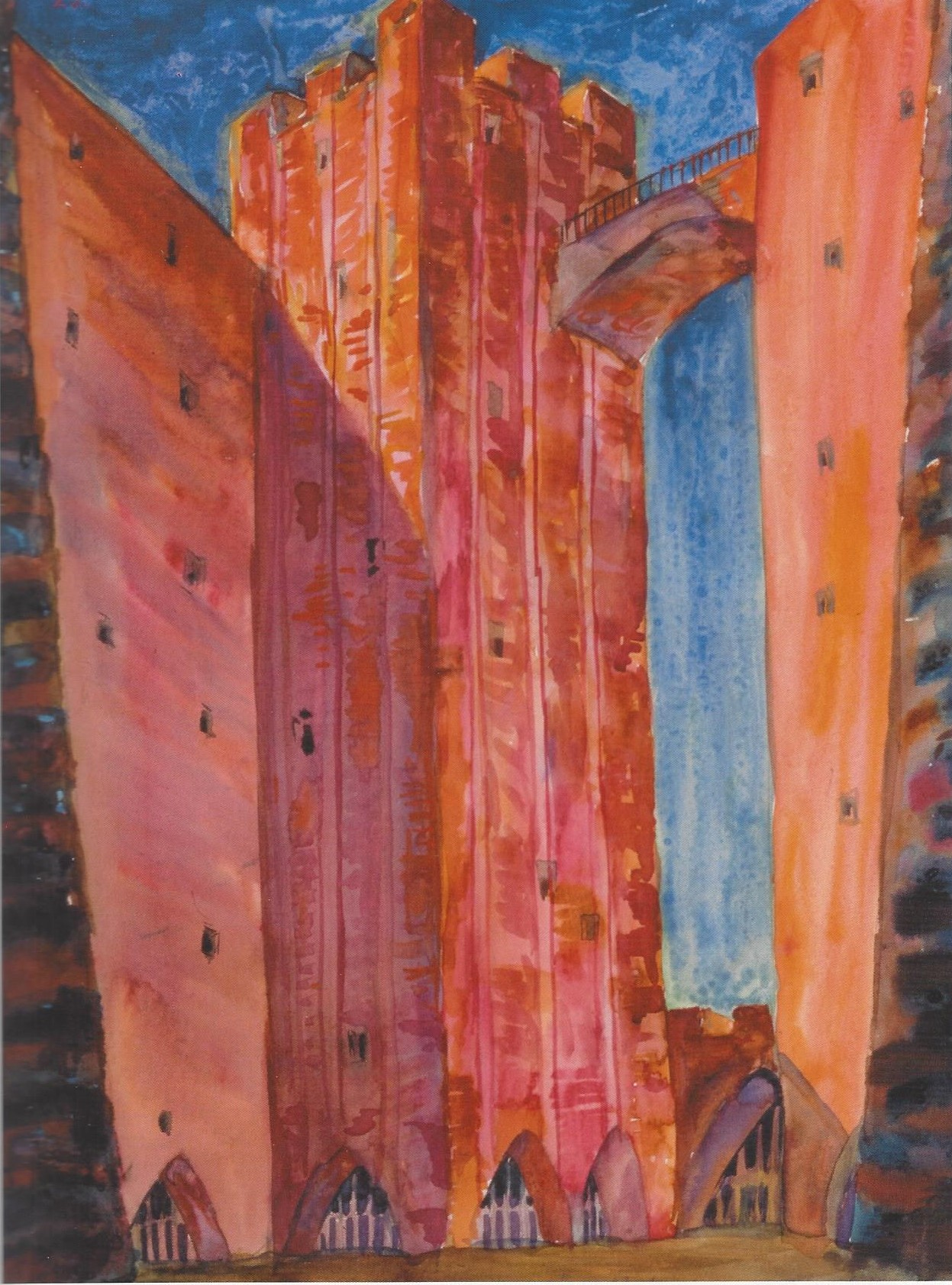
Set design for Fidelio

During this time, he married the artist, Fanny Hildebrandt (1880-1960). They had one daughter, Gemma (1907-1994), who became a goldsmith, and two sons: Stefan (1911-1984), who was also an architect, and Urban, a well-known sculptor.

Through his brother-in-law, the psychiatrist Kurt Hildebrandt, he came into contact with an intellectual group that included the historian, Friedrich Wolters and the lawyer, Berthold Vallentin. They, in turn, introduced him to the "George-Kreis", centered around the poet, Stefan George, of which he became an enthusiastic member, as did his children. In 1927, Gemma would marry Wolters, who was three years older than her father.

In 1915, upon the recommendation of Bruno Paul, he was chosen from seventy-six applicants to become director of the Handwerkerschule (Crafts School) in Halle. He immediately began to reorganize the school according to the principles of the Deutscher Werkbund, hiring several new instructors and beginning a new program for textiles. He was also influenced by the ideas of the George-Kreis. In 1922, the school moved to Burg Giebichenstein, its name was changed to the "State-Municipal School of Applied Arts" and it became a center for the Bauhaus movement.

Thiersch endeavored to help design the area around the Burg. In 1926, he and Gerhard Marcks worked together on designing the new Kröllwitzer Bridge over the Saale, which is now one of the city's landmarks. That same year, he created plans for the new Leipzig/Halle Airport, but only the main hangar was built. He had more success with projects for stage design, of which he created almost forty for theatres in Halle, Leipzig and Göttingen. From 1921 to 1926, he was also Director of the Moritzburg-Halle Art Museum. While there, he acquired paintings by Emil Nolde, Franz Marc and Oskar Kokoschka.

In hopes of working full-time as an architect, he accepted the chair of "spatial art" at the University of Hanover, and was succeeded at the Burg by Marcks. However, only a few weeks after arriving there, he died suddenly, at the age of forty-nine. A street in Halle was later named after him.

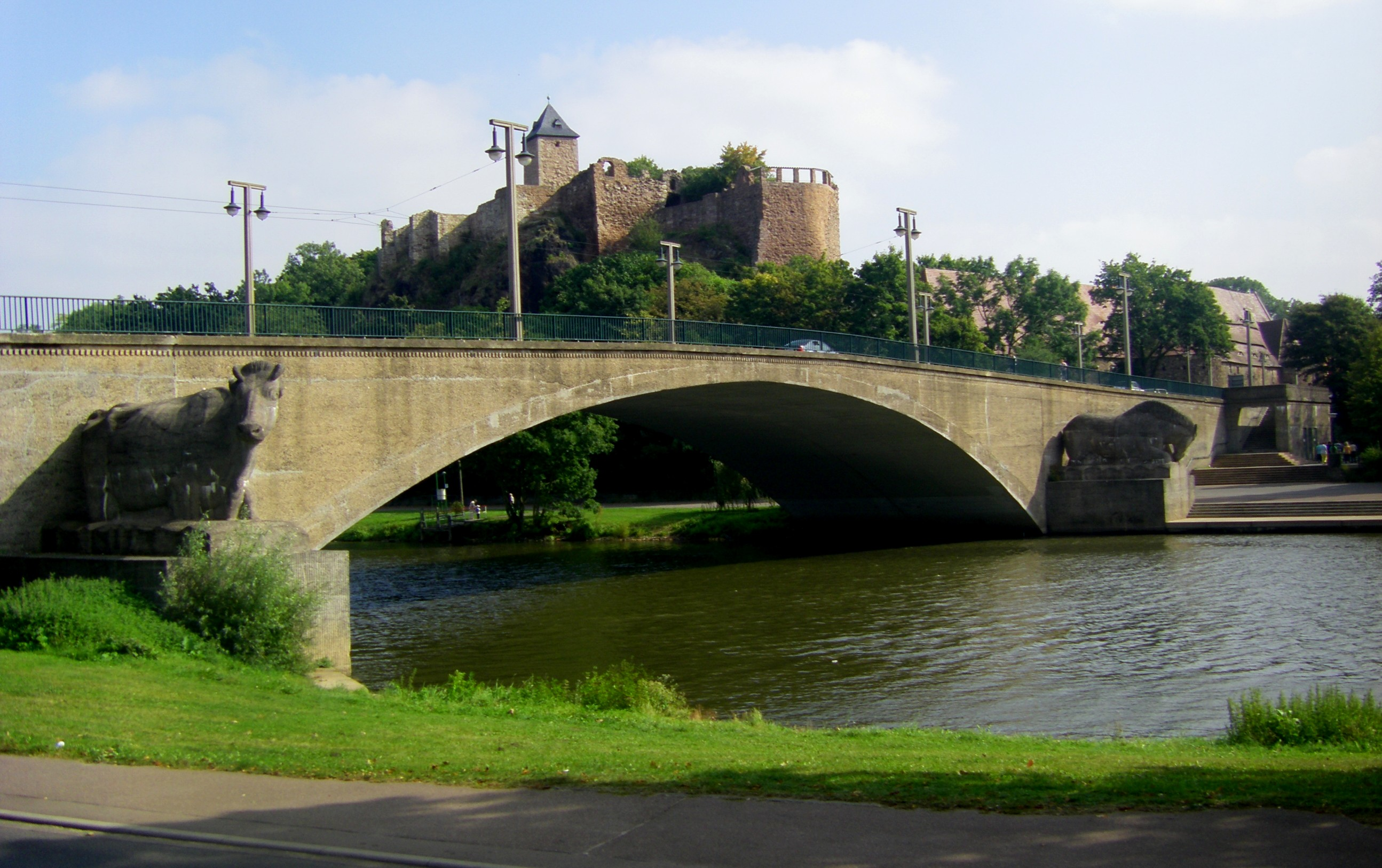
The Kröllwitzer Bridge

== Sources ==
- Burg Giebichenstein, Die Hallesche Kunstschule von den Anfängen bis zur Gegenwart. Staatliche Galerie Moritzburg Halle, Badisches Landesmuseum Karlsruhe, Halle 1992; ISBN 3-86105-076-5
- Rudolf Fahrner (Ed.): Paul Thiersch – Leben und Werk. Mann, Berlin 1970, ISBN 3-7861-4024-3
- Wilhelm Nauhaus: Die Burg Giebichenstein, Geschichte einer deutschen Kunstschule, 1915 - 1933, E. A. Seemann, Leipzig 1981, ISBN 3-363-00539-3
- Katja Schneider: Paul Thiersch und die Bühne (exhibition catalog), Staatliche Galerie Moritzburg, Halle/Saale 1995, ISBN 3-86105-121-4
- Siegfried Wölffling: "Paul Thiersch und seine Beziehungen zum Stefan-George-Kreis". In: 1915 - 1990. 75 Jahre Burg Giebichenstein. Beiträge zur Geschichte. Verlag der Burg Giebichenstein, Halle/Saale 1990
