= Church of the Holy Trinity, Athens =

Church in Athens, Greece

Coordinates: 37°58.392′N 23°44.04′E

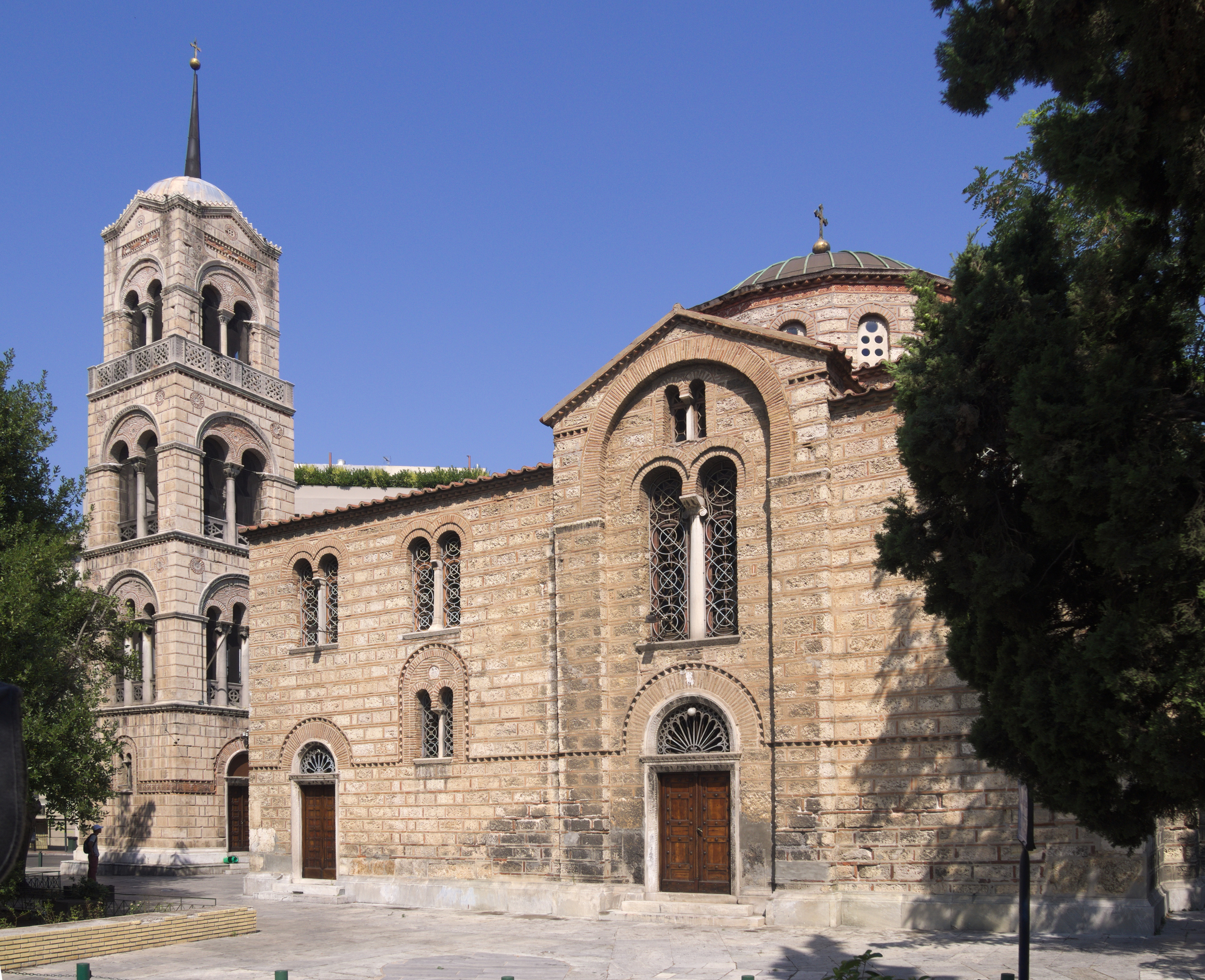
Exterior view of the Holy Trinity church

The Church of the Holy Trinity (Greek: Ναός Αγίας Τριάδος, romanized: Naos Agias Triados, Russian: Церковь Святой Троицы) is a Byzantine-era church at Filellinon Street that serves the Russian Orthodox community of Athens, Greece.

== History ==
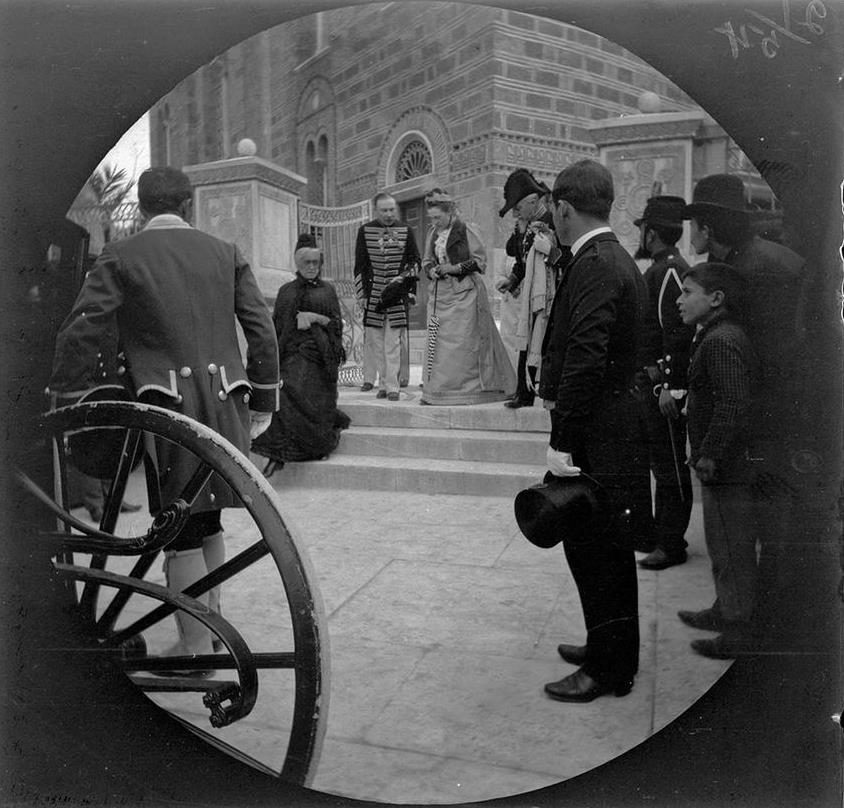
Queen Olga at the church of the Holy Trinity, 1891

The church is known by a variety of names: the Russian Church (Ρωσική Εκκλησία), or St. Nikodemos (Greek: Άγιος Νικόδημος), a name of modern origin that is a corruption of its original name Soteira Lykodimou (Σωτείρα Λυκοδήμου, "the [Virgin] Saviouress of Lykodemos"), with "Lykodemos" probably the family name of one of its founders. It was originally the katholikon of a large convent, but the rest of the convent was torn down in 1778 by the Ottoman governor, Hadji Ali Haseki, to construct new city wall.

The 19th-century Greek archaeologist Kyriakos Pittakis suggested a connection between the name "Lykodemos" and the classical Lyceum of Aristotle. While the suggestion can not be proved, excavations prior to the church's reconstruction in the 1850s revealed the foundations of an earlier church on the site, dating to the 6th century, when the city's Classical traditions were still remembered. However, the discovery of the Lyceum's actual site in 1996 disproved that theory.

A number of graffiti in the church indicate that the present structure was built before 1044 (or even earlier, 1031), and mention the name of the protoktetor ("first founder"), Stephen. Its morphology, which closely emulates that of Hosios Loukas, completed in 1011, indicates a terminus post quem for its construction. No further information about the church is known during the subsequent centuries, until the earthquake of 3 September 1705, when it suffered considerable damage, after which it is believed to have been repaired and its interior decoration renewed. However, the 19th-century Russian archimandrite Antonin further reported that the church was abandoned already in the 16th century, along with the wider area.

In 1821, during the Greek siege of the Acropolis, it was severely damaged by a cannonball fired by the Ottoman defenders: two-thirds of the dome and the entire west wall, as well as the vaults above the narthex, collapsed. As a result, after the end of the Greek War of Independence it was abandoned and gradually fell to ruin. In 1847, the Russian tsar Nicholas I proposed to acquire the church to provide religious services to the Russian community in Athens. The Greek government agreed, provided that the existing church be restored to its original state.

The technical committee assembled to examine the church initially concluded that it would be best if it were demolished and replaced by a new structure, but in the end, it was decided to restore and rebuild it as close as possible to the original. The work was carried out from 1850 to 1855, under the supervision of Greek Army major T. Vlasopoulos; the dome, western side and almost all vaults were removed and replaced, but the eastern side, much of the northern and southern side, as well as the lower parts of the western wall, are those of the original Byzantine building. A number of more or less radical interventions, however, were made that altered the building considerably. At the instigation of the French scholar A. Couchaud, all interior non-bearing walls were removed, in an attempt to restore the church to its "original" state. While some of these walls were indeed later 18th-century additions, many were integral to the original church, serving to delimit its functional spaces. Vlasopoulos also added "elaborate doorways, window mullions and above all the high chamfered marble crépis", which "detracted from the monument's authenticity", while the marble templon of the church was carried off and never restored. It is now known only through a drawing by the French A. Lenoir, probably sketched in 1840.

== Description ==
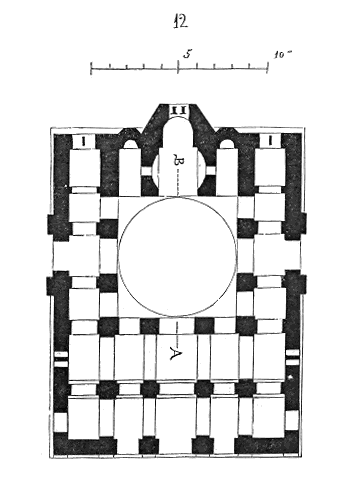
Plan of the church

The largest surviving Byzantine church in Athens, it is "clearly the earliest and most faithful copy" of the great katholikon of the Hosios Loukas monastery, both in morphology, dimensions—the Athenian church features measurements almost exactly three quarters those of Hosios Loukas—and in decoration. Its design is a typically middle Byzantine cross-in-square, with a dome resting on an octagonal base. The masonry is of high quality, with dressed stones separated by double courses of bricks. The exterior features pseudo-Kufic decorative designs of brick, similar to Hosios Loukas and another Athenian church, the Church of the Holy Apostles, which is roughly contemporary. Some are placed individually amidst the masonry, but others have been used to form a frieze running on three sides of the building, with champlevé ornaments on white plaster, emulating contemporary Byzantine art.

The present interior decoration consists of frescoes that were carried out as part of the mid-19th century restoration by the German artist Ludwig Thiersch, with the assistance of Nikiforos Lytras and Spyridon Hatzigiannopoulos. Save for a bust of Christ and two angels on an arch on the southern wall of the church, the previous interior decoration of the church has been lost. Most of what is known about it comes from the sketches made by the French scholar Paul Durand. From the available evidence, the building had undergone at least three further phases of decoration during its history until then, the last in the early 18th century, as part of the repairs to the damage caused by the 1705 earthquake. According to Durand's sketches, most of the decoration represented late examples of the Cretan School. however the dome paintings, which showed eight angels surrounding and supporting the large Christ Pantokrator in the dome, probably dated to the original decorative ensemble from the 11th century.

== Sources ==
- Bouras, Charalambos (2004). "The Soteira Lykodemou at Athens. Architecture". Δελτίον της Χριστιανικής Αρχαιολογικής Εταιρείας. 4. 25: 11–24.
- Freely, John (2004). Strolling through Athens: Fourteen Unforgettable Walks through Europe's Oldest City. Tauris Parke Paperbacks. ISBN 978-1-85043-595-2.
- Lynch, John Patrick (1972). Aristotle's School; a Study of a Greek Educational Institution. University of California Press. ISBN 978-0-52002-194-5.
