= Cleonice =

Cleonice may refer to:

- Cleonice (genus), a genus of flies
  - Cleonice callida, a species of fly
- Cleonice Berardinelli (1916–2023), Brazilian academic
- Cleonice, Princess of Bithynia, a 1775 tragedy by John Hoole

== See also ==
- Kleoniki
