= Kleoniki =

Kleoniki (Κλεονίκη) is a Greek feminine given name, derived from kléos (κλέος 'glory, fame') + níki (νίκη 'victory'). Notable people with the name include:

- Kleoniki Alexopoulou (born 1984), Greek historian
- Kleoniki Gennadiou (died 1909), Greek painter and sculptor

== See also ==
- Cleonice
