= Friedrich von Thiersch =

German architect and painter

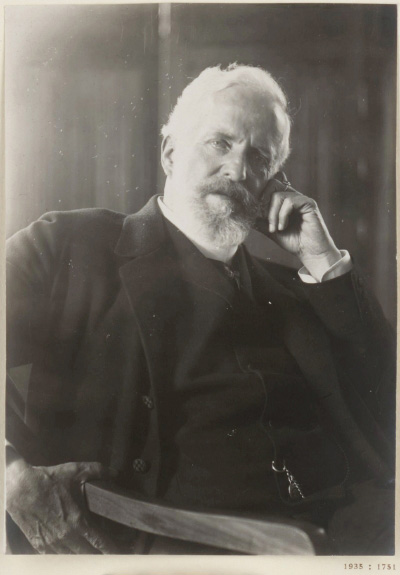
Friedrich von Thiersch (date unknown)

Friedrich Maximilian Thiersch, after 1897 Ritter von Thiersch (18 April 1852, Marburg – 23 December 1921, Munich), was a German architect and painter in the late Historicist style.

== Life and work ==
His father, H. W. J. Thiersch, was a prominent theologian and his uncle, Ludwig, was a painter. His older brother, August, and his nephew, Paul, were also architects. From 1868 to 1873, he studied architecture at the Technische Hochschule Stuttgart. He then worked for the firm of Karl Jonas Mylius and Alfred Friedrich Bluntschli, in Frankfurt-am-Main. Following a series of professional disputes, he became a free-lance architect in 1878.

He took several trips around Europe, notably Greece, to acquire a knowledge of building history. In 1882, he passed the exam for his habilitation and was appointed a Professor at the Technische Hochschule München. Although he stayed there until his retirement (serving as Rector from 1906 to 1908), he designed and built projects throughout Germany.

Justizpalast, Munich (2024)

In 1882, he participated in the second competition to design a new Reichstag Building in Berlin. The jury had trouble coming to a decision, so both he and Paul Wallot were formally given first prize but, as only one design could be used, the contract went to Wallot. Three years later, he entered another competition, to design the Reichsgericht in Leipzig. Ludwig Hoffmann won the contract, but Thiersch's work made such a positive impression that he was awarded a contract for the Justizpalast in Munich two years later.

During this time, he married Auguste Eibler, daughter of the Kommerzialrat (Commerce Councilor) Eduard Eibler (1844-1915), from Lindau. They had eight children, including the writer, Berta Thiersch and the graphic designer, Frieda Thiersch, who was also the head of a major bookbindery.

He was occupied with the Justizpalast project from 1891 to 1897, and was unable to accept an offered position at the Technische Hochschule in Charlottenburg (now Technische Universität Berlin). However, when it was completed, he was awarded the Knight's Medal by Luitpold, Prince Regent of Bavaria, and elevated to the nobility. After only five years of use, the Justizpalast proved to be too small, so he designed an addition, known as the Neues Justizgebäude, which was built from 1902 to 1905.

At the same time, Emperor Wilhelm II engaged him to design a building to replace the aging spa in Wiesbaden. The new, monumental structure, known as the Kurhaus, was inaugurated in 1907. Its luxurious concert and event hall was named after Thiersch. He also won a competition to design the Festhalle in Frankfurt-am-Main; which was completed in 1909.

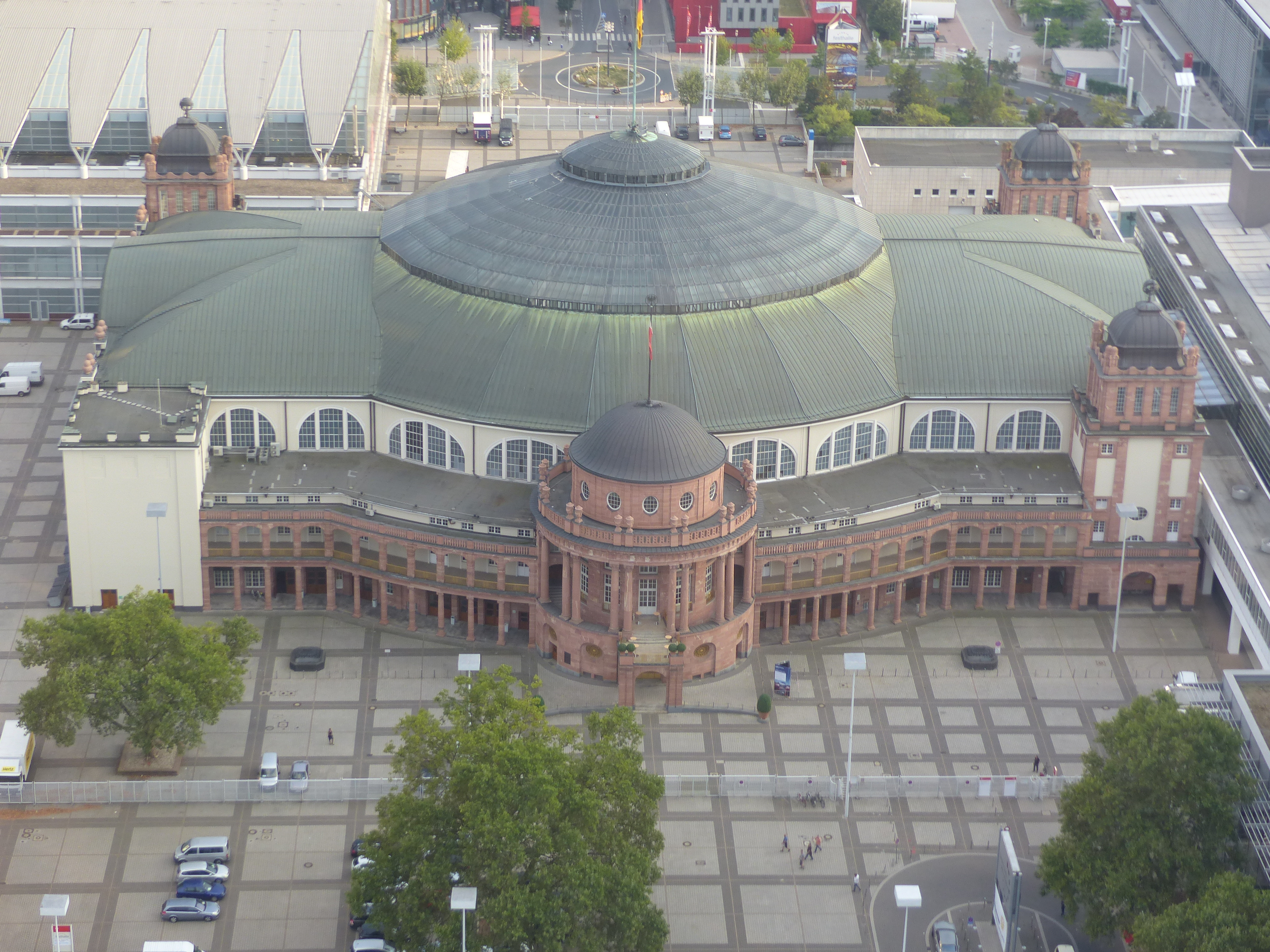
The Festhalle Frankfurt in 2016

The last decade of his life was marked by personal losses. In January of 1914, he lost his daughter, Marie. Later that same year, his son Ernst was killed in World War I. His brother, August, died in 1917, and his son-in-law, Albrecht Zeller, died in 1918, followed by his second son, Friedrich, in 1920. He died the following year, during the Christmas holidays, and was interred at the Waldfriedhof.

== Sources ==
- Hermann Thiersch: Friedrich von Thiersch, der Architekt (1852–1921). Ein Lebensbild. Weidmannsche Buchhandlung, Berlin 1925.
- Johann-Georg Fuchs: Friedrich von Thiersch. Ein Münchner Maler und Zeichner. Cardamina Verlag, Plaidt 2013 ISBN 978-3-86424-079-9
