= HWJ =

HWJ may refer to:

- History Workshop Journal, a British academic history journal published by Oxford University Press
- H. W. J. Thiersch (1817–1885), German Evangelical theologian and philologist
