= Steiniella =

Steiniella may refer to:

- Steiniella, a genus of algae in the family Gonyaulacaceae; synonym of Gonyaulax
- Steiniella C.Bernard, 1908, nom. illeg., a genus of algae in the family Scenedesmaceae; replaced by Steinedesmus
- Steiniella, synonym for the fly genus Cleonice
