= Wall of Haseki =

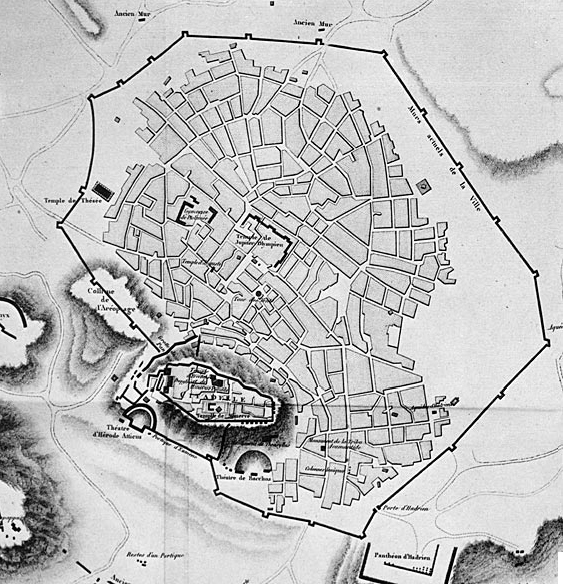
Map of late Ottoman Athens, with the Wall of Haseki

The so-called Wall of Haseki (Greek: Τείχος του Χασεκή, romanized: Teichos tou Haseki) was a city wall built around Athens by its Ottoman governor, Hadji Ali Haseki, in 1778. Initially intended to protect the city from attacks by Ottoman Muslim Albanian warbands, it became an instrument of Haseki's tyrannical rule over the city.

The wall was demolished in 1834, having been reduced to ruins during the Ottoman siege of Athens in 1826.

== History ==
The 1770s were a period of lawlessness and disorder in southern Greece, particularly due to the presence of roving Ottoman-Albanian warbands, that had been brought in by the Porte to suppress the Orlov Revolt in the Morea in 1770. In 1778, such a warband arrived in Attica, and sent emissaries to Athens, threatening to burn the city unless they received provisions and an official document hiring them as guards of the city. The Ottoman governor, Hadji Ali Haseki, and the Athenian populace, both Christians and Muslims, resolved to meet the Albanians in the field, as the city was unfortified except for the Acropolis. In a battle that took place near Halandri, the Athenians defeated the Albanians. To secure the city against another attack, Haseki immediately began construction of a new city wall. Work had not progressed far when a second and far larger force of 6,000 Albanians approached, under a certain Maksut, on their way to the Morea. The Turks then abandoned the city and found refuge in the Acropolis, while Haseki allowed the Greeks to move to Salamis Island for safety. There they remained for 13 days, until the Albanians departed, after receiving a substantial sum as a bribe. Construction on the wall resumed with increased vigour: Haseki not only enlisted the entire population of the city without distinction, but himself participated in the work, so that the 10 km long wall was completed in 108 days, or, according to other reports, in only 70 days. Many ancient and medieval monuments were demolished and reused as building material (spolia) in the process. Haseki then promptly presented the Athenians with a bill for 42,500 piastres, ostensibly for the supervisors he had brought from outside. Not only that, but he placed guards at the gates, so that the wall served to virtually imprison the population in their own city.

During and after the Ottoman siege of Athens in 1826, the wall was reduced to ruins, like most of the city; its remains were demolished in 1834.

== Description ==
The hastiness of the construction resulted in a wall only about 3 metres (9.8 ft) high and less than 1 metre (3.3 ft) thick, rather than a proper fortification. The course of the wall was as follows: from the Odeon of Herodes Atticus at the foot of the Acropolis, it went to the Theatre of Dionysus, and thence to the Arch of Hadrian, whose lower portion was walled up. From there it followed the course of the modern Vasilissis Amalias Avenue to Syntagma Square, thence down Stadiou Street to the original headquarters of the National Bank of Greece. From there it turned west to Koumoundourou Square, passed in front of the Theseion, over the Areopagus, and arrived again at the Odeon of Herodes Atticus.

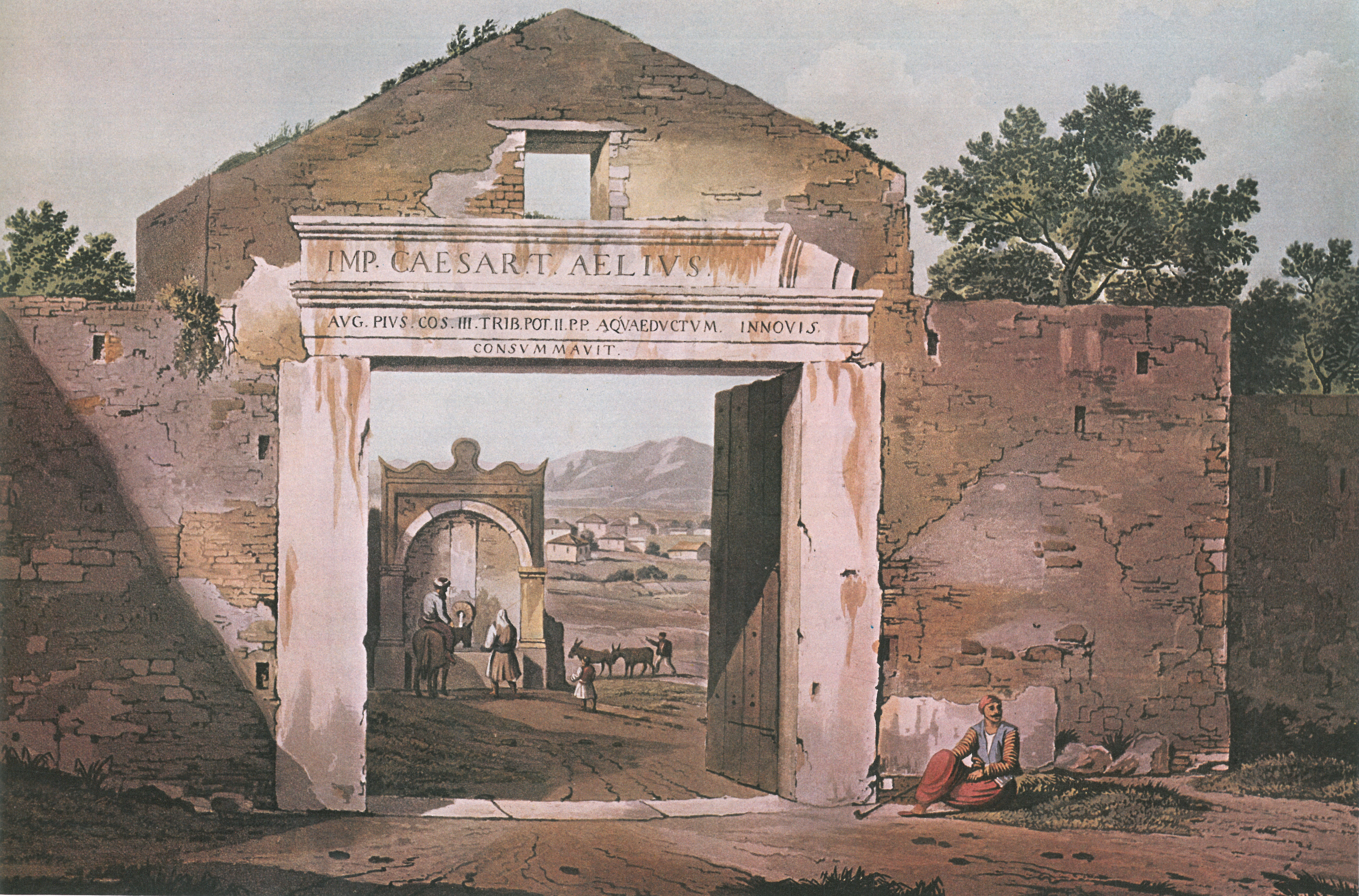
The Boubounistra Gate with the namesake fountain in the background, painted by Edward Dodwell. The spolia from Hadrian's aqueduct are evident.

The wall had seven gates:

- the "Castle Gate" (Πόρτα του Κάστρου) or "Karababa" (Πόρτα του Καράμπαμπα) in front of the Acropolis, which led to the Muslim cemetery outside the wall (hence also Πόρτα των Μνημάτων, "Gate of the Tombs"), and was rarely used
- the "Mandravili Gate" (Πόρτα του Μαντραβίλη), after a local family, also known as "Drakos Gate" (Πόρτα του Δράκου, Δρακόπορτα) and in Turkish "Lion Gate" (Aslan Kapısı), between the Theseion and the hill of the Pnyx, leading to the Piraeus
- the "Morea Gate" (Mora Kapısı) or "Gypsy Gate" (Γύφτικη Πόρτα) in the area of the Kerameikos, named after the Gypsy ironsmiths in the area
- the "Gate of Menidi" (Μενιδιάτικη Πόρτα) in modern Aiolou Street, also known as the "Gate of the Holy Apostles" (Πύλη Αγίων Αποστόλων) from the nearby Byzantine-era Church of the Holy Apostles; as it led to Euboea, in Turkish it was known as "Gate of Euboea" (Eğriboz Kapısı)
- the "Mesogeia Gate" (Μεσογείτικη Πόρτα, Mesoya Kapısı), or "Boubounistra" (Μπουμπουνίστρα), from the rushing sound of a local fountain, in Othonos Street
- the walled-up "Gate of the Princess" (Πόρτα της Βασιλοπούλας) or "Arch Gate" (Καμαρόπορτα), as the Arch of Hadrian was known
- the "Arvanite Gate" (Αρβανίτικη Πόρτα), in the mostly Arvanite-inhabited quarter of Plaka; it was also known as the "Three Towers Gate" (Πόρτα των Τριών Πύργων), and led to Phaleron and Cape Sounion

== Sources ==
- Freely, John (2004). Strolling through Athens: Fourteen Unforgettable Walks through Europe's Oldest City. Tauris Parke Paperbacks. ISBN 978-1-85043-595-2.
- Kominis, Markos (2008). Η Αθήνα κατά τα τελευταία χρόνια της Οθωμανικής Διοίκησης (18ος-19ος αιώνας) – Η πόλη και το διοικητικό καθεστώς [Athens during the last years of Ottoman Administration (18th–19th century) – The city and the administrative regime] (PDF) (Post-graduate Degree Thesis). Aristotle University of Thessaloniki.
- Miller, William (1921). The Turkish restoration in Greece, 1718-1797. London and New York: Society for Promoting Christian Knowledge, The Macmillan Company.
- Sicilianos, Demetrios (1960). Old and new Athens (Abridged ed.). Putnam.
- Vryonis, Speros (2002). "The Ghost of Athens in Byzantine and Ottoman Times". Balkan Studies: Biannual Publication of the Institute for Balkan Studies. 43 (1): 5–115. ISSN 2241-1674.
