= Esma Sultan (daughter of Ahmed III) =

Ottoman princess (1726–1788)

- Born: 14 March 1726; Topkapı Palace, Constantinople, Ottoman Empire
- Died: 13 August 1788 (aged 62); Kadırga Palace, Constantinople, Ottoman Empire
- Burial: Muhsinzade Mehmed Pasha Mausoleum, Eyüp, Istanbul
- Spouse: Yakub Pasha (m. 1743; died 1743); Yusuf Pasha (died 1751) Muhsinzade Mehmed Pasha (m. 1758; died 1774)
- Issue: Third marriage Zeynep Hanımsultan
- Dynasty: Ottoman
- Father: Ahmed III
- Mother: Hanife Kadın or Zeyneb Kadın
- Religion: Sunni Islam

Esma Sultan (Ottoman Turkish: اسما سلطان; 14 March 1726 – 13 August 1788), also called Büyük Esma (Esma "the elder"), was an Ottoman princess, daughter of Sultan Ahmed III and one of his consort, Hanife Kadın or Zeyneb Kadın. She was the half-sister of Sultans Mustafa III and Abdul Hamid I.

== Life ==
=== Birth ===
Esma Sultan was born on 14 March 1726 in the Topkapı Palace. Her father was Sultan Ahmed. Her mother is uncertain: Hanife Kadın or Zeyneb Kadın, two of her father's consorts. She was nicknamed Büyük Esma (Esma "the eldest") to distinguish her by her niece Küçük Esma (Esma "the younger"), daughter of Abdul Hamid I.

When she was four, her father was dethroned and she was confined, with her half-sisters, her mother and her father's other consorts, in the Old Palace, until her marriage.

=== Marriages ===
In 1743, her cousin Sultan Mahmud I, arranged her marriage to Yakub Pasha. The marriage took place in February 1743 in the Kadırga Palace. Yakub Pasha died the same year. After his death, she married the governor of Adana, Yusuf Piri Mustafâ Pasha. After his death in 1751, she married Muhsinzade Mehmed Pasha, a vizier on 24 June 1758 in the Kadırga Palace. He served as the Grand Vizier between 1765 and 1768, and later again between 1771 until his death in 1774. With him she had a daughter.

She is said to be curious about the west. She received the wife and mother-in-law of the Baron de Tott, the Hungarian nobleman who served as military adviser to the Turkish government for many years. She discussed with them the liberty of European women, and expressed the dissatisfaction that married her at a young age to an old man who treated her like a child. The pasha having died, she then married a younger man more to her liking, but the practice of sending the princesses husband to distant governorships kept them apart.

Furthermore, Esma Sultan was very influential during the reigns of her half-brothers Mustafa III and specially Abdul Hamid I, whom she was the favourite sister. It was she who reported to Abdul Hamid that his grand vizier, Halil Hamid Pasha, was plotting to depose him in favour of Selim III.

Esma Sultan presumably had some sort of chronic eye problem, because she was treated by three successive eye specialists. First, Esma Sultan was treated by the Polish eye specialist Regina Salomea Pilsztynowa between 1759 and 1760. Then, Esma Sultan was operated on by the ophthalmologist Felice Tadini in 1766. Finally, a third eye specialist was sought for Esma Sultan from within the Ottoman Empire in January 1771.

=== Properties ===
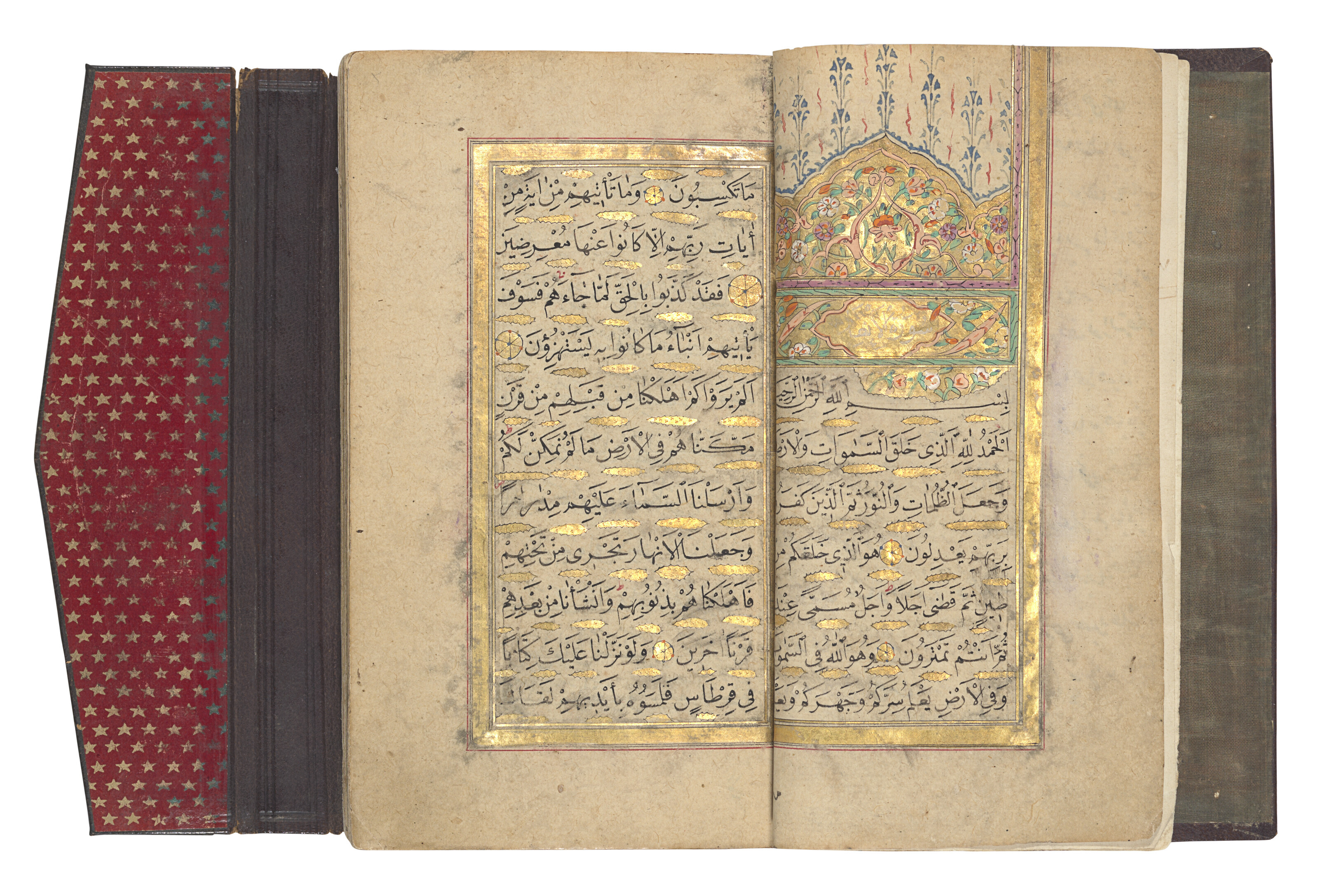
A prayer book made for the court of Esma Sultan. Created in Ottoman Turkey, dated 30 May 1778

Esma Sultan was among the wealthiest women in the Ottoman Empire, despite the rumor that she had a frugal personality.

Esma Sultan had her crown states turned into mâlikane contracts, which were divided among her protégés, and managed by agents and subcontractors. The name of one of her male associates appeared as contractor in his own right.

Esma also complained that her late husband, Mehmed Pasha, had promised her the income from Vâsıf's prebend from Anatolia. She accused him of stealing the grant, confiscated it, and transferred it to her own client. Because she was so close to the Sultan, and because Vâsıf lacked influential patrons, he couldn't find anyone to intercede on his behalf, and was left without a job and income.

Esma Sultan was allocated the mansion of Princess Hançerli Sultan in Eyüp Bahariye, which became famous with her own name. She also owned a waterfront palace in Ortaköy, and a farm in Terkos.

=== Charities ===
In 1779, Esma Sultan commissioned a fountain for the soul of her late husband, Mehmed Pasha, in her name near the namazgah in Kadırga Square. She also commissioned another fountain in her name in the same place in 1781.

== Death ==
Esma Sultan died on 13 August 1788 in the Kadırga Palace, and was buried in the mausoleum of Muhsinzade Mehmed Pasha in Eyüp.

== Issue ==
By her third marriage, Esma Sultan had at least one daughter:

- Zeynep Hanımsultan (1759 – ?)

In addition, Esma educated the future Nakşidil Sultan, who would later become a consort of Abdul Hamid I, and the mother and Valide Sultan of Mahmud II.

== In popular culture ==
- In 2012 Turkish miniseries Esir Sultan, Esma is portrayed by Turkish actress Hande Kazanova.

== See also ==
- Hadji Ali Haseki, protégé and alleged lover of Esma Sultan
- List of Ottoman princesses

== Sources ==
- Sakaoğlu, Necdet (2008). Bu mülkün kadın sultanları: Vâlide sultanlar, hâtunlar, hasekiler, kadınefendiler, sultanefendiler. Oğlak Yayıncılık. ISBN 978-9-753-29623-6.
- Uluçay, Mustafa Çağatay (2011). Padişahların kadınları ve kızları. Ankara: Ötüken. ISBN 978-9-754-37840-5.
