= Capitulation of Alexandria (1801) =

1801 capitulation during the French Campaign in Egypt and Syria

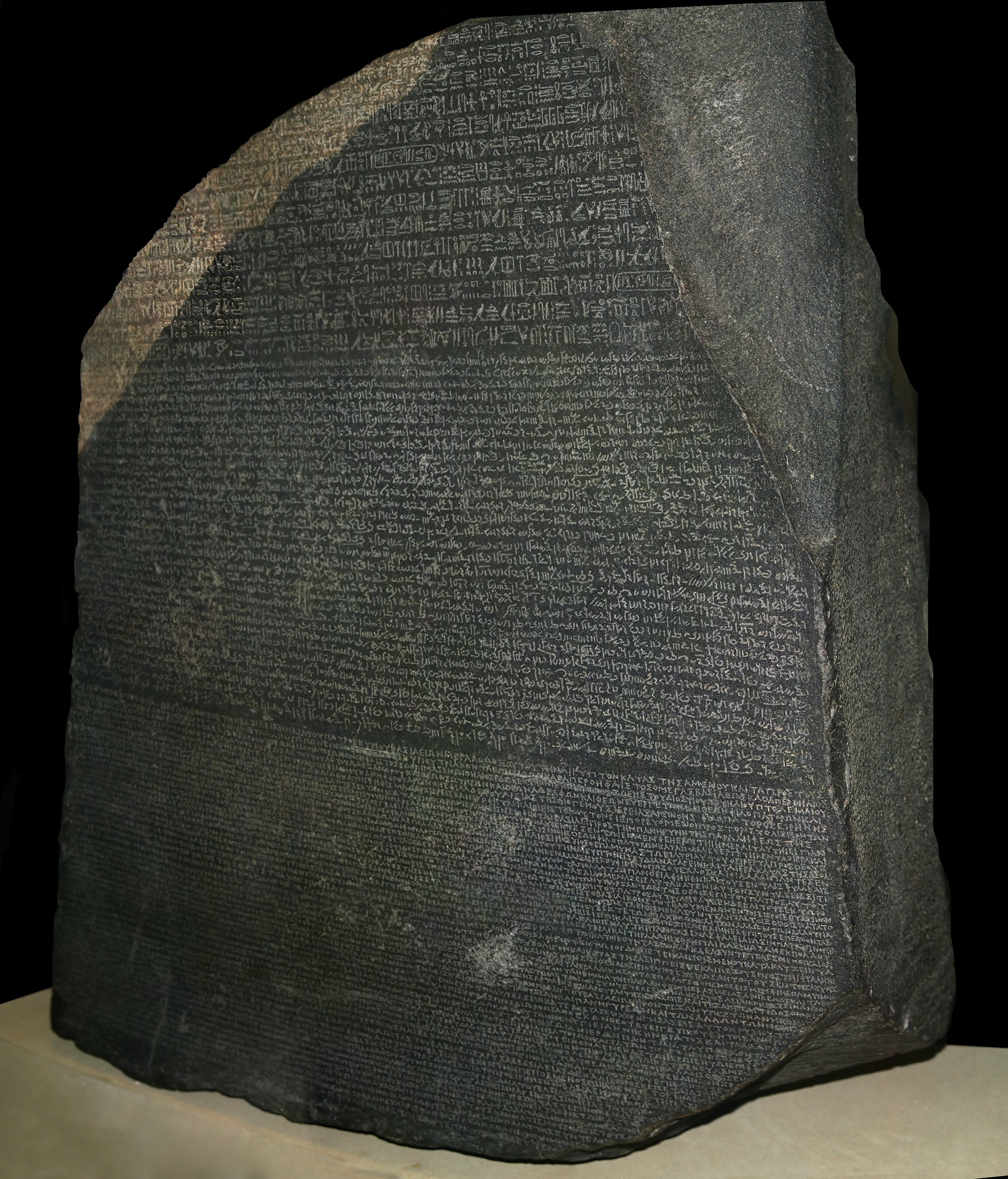
- The Rosetta Stone now in the British Museum, London
- Context: End of the French expedition to Egypt
- Signed: 1801
- Location: Alexandria, Egypt

The Capitulation of Alexandria in September 1801 brought the French invasion of Egypt and Syria to an end.

== Background ==
French troops, who had been abandoned by Napoleon Bonaparte who left for France never to return, had been defeated by British and Ottoman forces, and had retreated to Alexandria where they were besieged. On 30 August 1801 the French general Abdullah Jacques-François Menou offered to surrender and proposed terms, which were considered, partly accepted and in many details amended, by the British general John Hely-Hutchinson and admiral Lord Keith.

== Text ==
The text of the Capitulation is printed in full in Robert Wilson's History of the British expedition to Egypt. Each article as proposed by General Menou is followed by a comment: the proposed articles as amended by these comments form the capitulation as it was finally put into effect, bringing the conflict to a formal end on 2 September 1801. The document is signed by General-in-Chief Menou, Admiral Keith, Lt.-General Hely-Hutchinson, Lt.-Col. James Kempt, and the Kapudan Pasha Küçük Hüseyin Pasha, representing the Ottoman forces.

== Transfer of Egyptian antiquities ==
Under Article 16 of the capitulation "the Arabian manuscripts, the statues, and the other collections which have been made for the French Republic, shall be considered as public property, and subject to the disposal of the generals of the combined army." This led to the transfer to British possession of the Rosetta Stone and other Egyptian antiquities collected by the French Commission des Sciences et des Arts and the scholars of the Institut d'Egypte.

== Spoils ==
At the Capitulation, the British discovered the French warships Cause, Egyptienne, Justice and Régénérée, and two former Venetian frigates in the harbour of Alexandria. The British and their Turkish allies agreed a division of the spoils. The British received Égyptienne, Régénérée, and "Venetian No. 2" – named by the French Léoben (ex-Venetian Medusa) – of 26 guns. the Ottomans received the 64-gun Causse (ex-Venetian Vulcano), Justice, of 46 guns, and "Venetian No. 1" – Mantoue (ex-Venetian Cerere) – also of 26 guns. The Turks also received some Turkish corvettes that were in the harbour. (Note: One of these was the 12-gun corvette Héliopolis, which the French had captured at Alexandria in July 1798 and taken into service, see Winfield, Rif; Roberts, Stephen S. (2015). "Corvettes". French Warships in the Age of Sail 1786–1861: Design, Construction, Careers and Fates. Seaforth Publishing. ISBN 978-1-84832-204-2.) Admiral Lord Keith commander of the naval forces, gave the value of Régénérée for prize money purposes at £16,771 13s 6d.
