= Cleonice callida =

Scientific classification
- Kingdom: Animalia
- Phylum: Arthropoda
- Clade: Pancrustacea
- Class: Insecta
- Order: Diptera
- Family: Tachinidae
- Subfamily: Tachininae
- Tribe: Ernestiini
- Genus: Cleonice
- Species: C. callida

Binomial name
- Cleonice callida (Meigen, 1824)

Synonyms
- Tachina callida Meigen, 1824

Species of fly

Cleonice callida is a European species of fly in the family Tachinidae.
