= Kleoniki Gennadiou =

Greek painter and sculptor

- Κλεονίκη Γενναδίου
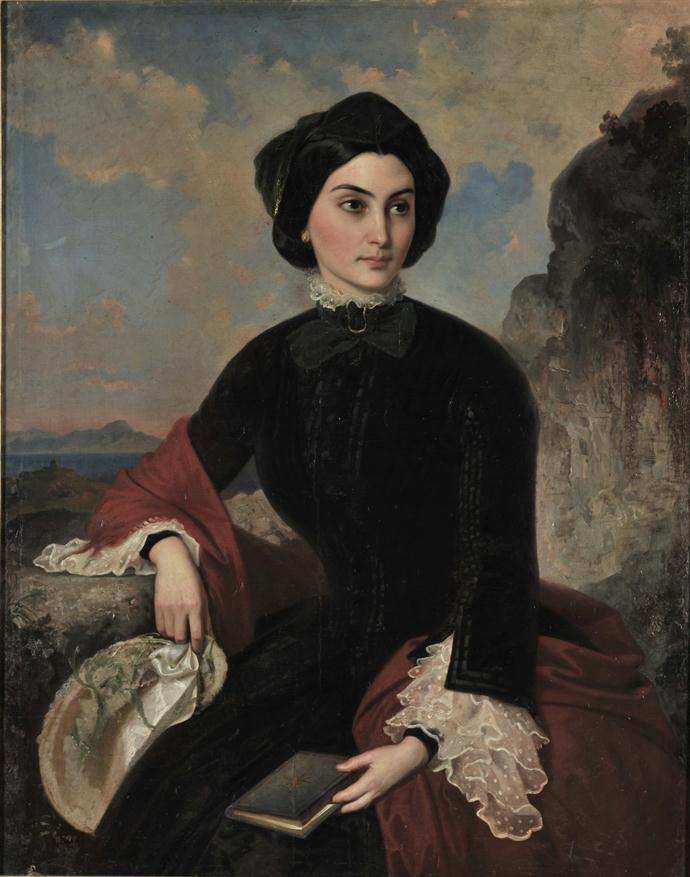
- Gennadiou c. 1856–59, by Ludwig Thiersch
- Born: Athens, Kingdom of Greece
- Died: March 14, 1909
- Occupations: Painter; sculptor

Kleoniki Gennadiou (Greek: Κλεονίκη Γενναδίου; died March 14, 1909) was a Greek painter and sculptor.

== Life ==
Kleoniki Gennadiou was born in Athens, and throughout her life traveled to Italy and Munich. She received the Silver Prize at the 1888 Olympic Exhibition at the Zappeion. With her sister Elpida she published the work Biographical Notes. Contribution to the History of Modern Greek Art (Trieste 1909).

== Artworks ==
In London, she exhibited the Maid of Athens, an artwork inspired by the poem by Lord Byron. Her other prominent works are The Church of St. George in Venice in Full Moon and Head of a Spaniard.
