= Hadji Ali Haseki =

Ottoman voivode of Athens (r. 1775–1795)

Hadji Ali Haseki (Turkish: Hacı Ali Haseki, Greek: Χατζή Αλής Χασεκής) was an 18th-century Ottoman Turk and for twenty years (1775–1795) on-and-off ruler of Athens, where he is remembered for his cruel and tyrannical rule.

== Biography ==
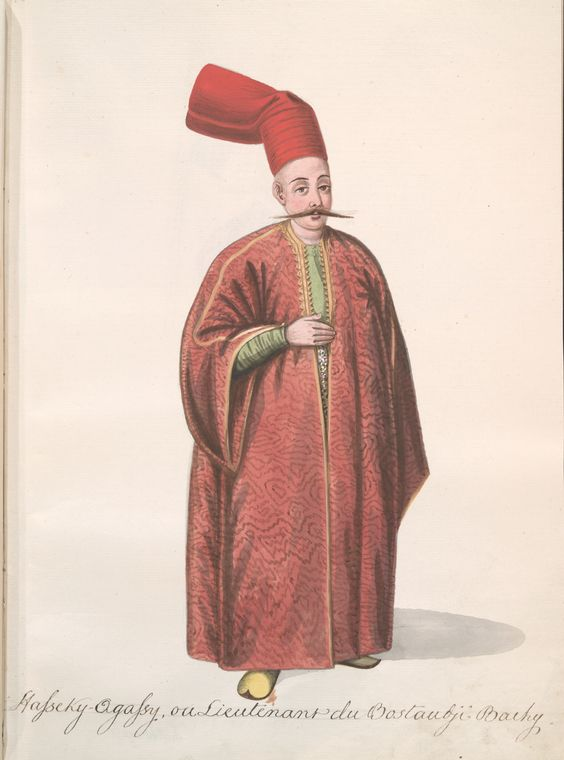
Depiction of a haseki of the Sultan's guard

The career of Hadji Ali Haseki is known chiefly from two sources, written by contemporaries: the journals of the Athenian scholar Ioannis Benizelos, and the memoirs of Panagiotis Skouzes. They are complemented by the reports of Western European travellers, and subsequent Greek historians.

According to Skouzes, Hadji Ali was born in central Anatolia, and had entered the palace service (Enderûn) as a youth. He eventually became a personal bodyguard (haseki) to Sultan Abdul Hamid I (r. 1773–1789), as well as of his sister Esma Sultan. Skouzes reports rumours that Haseki and Esma were lovers, and that she greatly favoured him and promoted his interests as a result. According to Benizelos, prior to coming to Athens, he had served as voivode (civil governor) of Durrës.

=== Background: Late Ottoman Athens ===
Athens had been under Ottoman rule continuously since 1456, apart from a brief Venetian occupation in 1687–1688, during the Morean War. Under Ottoman rule, the city was denuded of any importance and is commonly dismissed as a "small country town" by modern scholars such as Franz Babinger, but this image is incorrect: the city's population grew rapidly during the 16th century, and with c. 16,000 was for a time the fourth-largest Ottoman town in the Balkans, after the capital Constantinople, Adrianople, and Thessalonica. The Venetian occupation led to the near-abandonment of the city in fear of Ottoman reprisals, and it began to recover only slowly. By the middle of the century, the city numbered c. 10,000 inhabitants, of whom about 4/5 were Greek Orthodox, i.e. Greeks and a few Arvanites—most of the Arvanites in the area of Attica lived in the countryside rather than in Athens itself—and the rest "Turks", i.e. Muslims regardless of ethnic origin, including Gypsies and "Aethiopians"; as well as a few Catholics (mostly Westerners resident in the city). There does not appear to have been a Jewish community in Athens during that time.

The Turkish community numbered several families established in the city since the Ottoman conquest. Their relations with their Christian neighbours were friendlier than elsewhere, as they had assimilated themselves to their Christian neighbours, even to the point of drinking wine, speaking Greek, and allowing more freedom to women. The Greeks held the city's commerce in their hands, and enjoyed a measure of self-rule, headed by a council of elders (dimogerontes) or primates (proestotes), who assumed office every February and were selected from among the city's 15–20 aristocratic families (archontes). The archontes held much power, sometimes using it for the benefit of the Greek populace, but at others allying with the Ottoman authorities to preserve their privileges. Under the archontes were the noikokyraioi ("burghers"), numbering 24 families according to Skouzes, the pazarites, merchants and artisans, and the xotarides, the poorer farmers. The villagers of Attica, the choriates, were ranked at the bottom of the social hierarchy. The climate was healthy, but the city relied chiefly on pasture—practiced by the Arvanites of Attica—rather than agriculture. It exported leather, soap, grain, oil, honey, wax, resin, a little silk, cheese, and valonia, chiefly to Constantinople and France. In the late 18th century, the city hosted a French and an English consul.

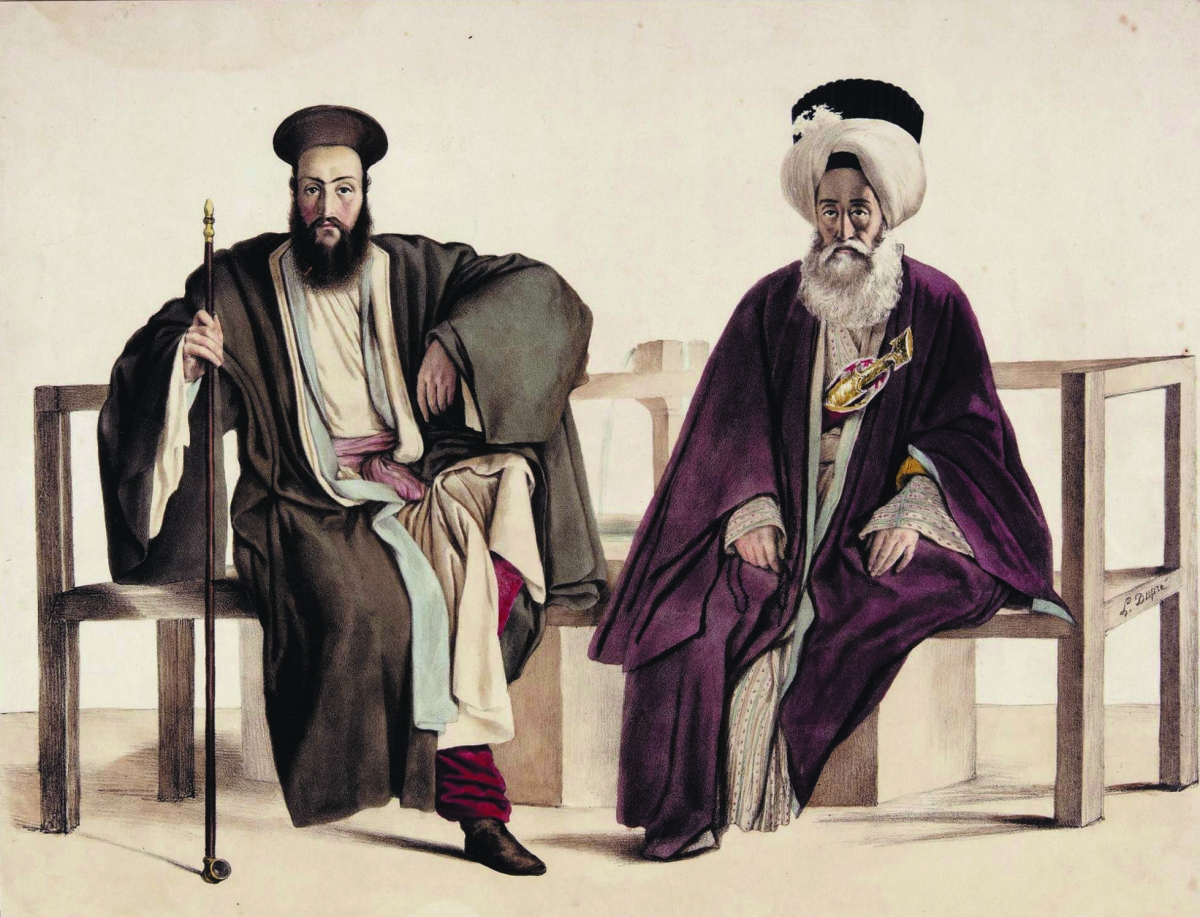
A Greek priest (left) and an Ottoman agha (right), portrayed in Athens in 1819 by Louis Dupré

Although its administrative status in the early Ottoman centuries is unclear, by the 17th century Athens, though formally part of the Sanjak of Eğriboz (Negroponte, modern Chalkida) and hence ultimately under the jurisdiction of the Kapudan Pasha (the commander-in-chief of the Ottoman fleet), formed part of the vakıf of the Haramayn, the Muslim holy cities of Mecca and Medina, and was administered by the Kizlar Agha (the chief black eunuch of the Imperial Harem). Usually, however, its proceeds were rented out in a tax-farming arrangement to individuals, who then governed the city as its voivode. The voivode or zabit (head of police) was appointed for an annual tenure, beginning in March of each year. The post was lucrative, and voivodes generally tried to secure the renewal of their appointment. Bribes to the central government, but also the support of the local primates, were instrumental for the purpose. The zabit was complemented by the mufti, the local Muslim religious leader, the kadi (judge, head of the sharia court), the serdar (military governor), and the dizdar (fortress commander of the Acropolis of Athens). In 1760, Athens became a malikhane, a special landed estate that belonged to the Sultan but was given to high officials as a usufruct estate that entitled its owner (malikhane sahib) to the collection of the tithe and other tax proceeds, in theory for life, in exchange for a lump sum and an annual rent. The owner often sub-let the proceeds to one or more third persons, who then held the post of voivode. The new system was to the detriment of the city, because the voivodes had an interest to maximize their gains in their short period of office, and because abuses were harder to redress: under the Kizlar Agha, the Athenians could address their concerns to a single person, close to the Sultan, but with the new system, there were several people who held authority, and the link to the Porte was more tenuous. Furthermore, during the decades before Haseki's arrival in Athens, the zabit was in constant conflict with the pashas of Negroponte, who constantly sought to interfere in Athenian affairs.

=== First tenure as voivode of Athens ===
The exact manner and date of Haseki's arrival in Athens is unclear. Skouzes writes that in 1772, Esma Sultan acquired the malikhane of Athens at a price of 750,000 piastres—later in his account Skouzes raised the figure to 1.5 million piastres—and gave it over to Haseki. Benizelos, however, indicates that Haseki bought the malikhane of Athens when the previous owner died in 1776, after he had arrived at Athens as its voivode in 1775. Indeed, Benizelos remarks on his appointment to Athens that in 1774, a delegation of Athenians visited Constantinople to request the dismissal of the incumbent voivode, and that thereupon Haseki, using bribery, secured the office for himself. It is not until 1782 that Haseki is securely attested as the malikhane sahib of Athens.

Whatever the true background of his appointment, when Haseki came to Athens in 1775, he initially presented himself as a protector of the local Greeks, both against the transgressions of the local Turks, as well as against the excavations of the pasha of Negroponte: he forbade the entry of the latter's officials in the city, and managed to remove the Albanian garrison that Huseyn Pasha of Negroponte had installed in the city a few years earlier. He also made friends among the most important Athenian primates, so that when he began oppressing the lower classes, the primates refused to act against him. Thereupon the 24 burgher households and the lower classes, supported by the Metropolitan of Athens and the clergy, sent a petition (arz-i hal) denouncing Haseki to the Porte. He was recalled for a while, with a voivode from Chios appointed to govern the city in his stead.

=== Second tenure as voivode – Albanian incursions and fortification of Athens ===
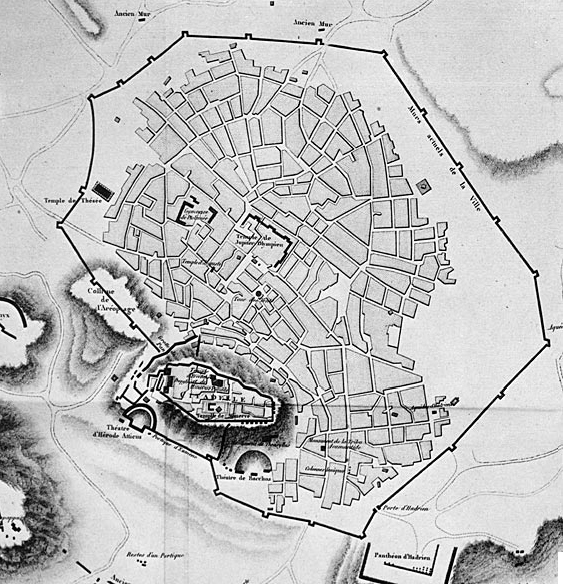
Map of late Ottoman Athens, with the Wall of Haseki

In 1777, however, Haseki managed to use his connections at court to secure his reappointment as voivode, with the support this time of the powerful Athenian Turk Makfi, the Vlastos family, and of the Metropolitan Bartholomew, who hoped to use Haseki's influence with the Sultan to be elected Patriarch of Constantinople. On his return, he forced the Athenians to recompense him for the financial losses incurred due to his temporary removal, which he put at 60,000 piastres.

1778 saw devastating raids by Muslim Albanian warbands into Attica, which served to strengthen Haseki's position. Albanians had been brought in by the Porte to suppress the Orlov Revolt in the Morea in 1770, and remained a menace to the area for many years thereafter: taking advantage of the weakness of the Ottoman administration, many Albanians moved south in search of plunder or employment as a kind of condottieri. Before Haseki's arrival, the Albanian Yiaholiouri had held the post of meydanbashi, one of the heads of security in Athens, at the head of some 50 to 80 men, of whom about two thirds were themselves Albanians. Haseki dismissed him, whereupon Yiaholiouri returned to his homeland; according to Skouzes he recruited there some 750 men to support his return to Attica. Yiaholiouri was joined by more Albanians and the poor and dispossessed as he marched south; his men sacked Thebes on their way. Once they arrived at Kapandriti near Athens, the Albanians sent emissaries to the Athenians, threatening to burn the city unless they received provisions and an official document hiring them as guards of the city. Haseki gathered the Athenians, both Turks and Greeks, in council, and resolved to meet the Albanians in the field, as the city lacked fortifications. In a battle that took place near Halandri, the Athenians defeated the Albanians and drove them back to Kifissia, killing about a fourth of them in the process.

To secure the city against another attack, Haseki immediately began construction of a new city wall, which became known after him as the "Wall of Haseki". Work had not progressed far when a second and far larger force of 6,000 Albanians approached, under a certain Maksut, on their way to the Morea. The Turks then abandoned the city and found refuge in the Acropolis of Athens, while Haseki allowed the local Greeks to move to Salamis Island for safety. There they remained for 13 days, until the Albanians departed, after receiving a substantial sum as a bribe. Construction on the wall resumed with increased vigour: Haseki not only enlisted the entire population of the city without distinction, but himself participated in the work, so that the 10 km long wall was completed in 108 days, or, according to other reports, in only 70 days. Many ancient and medieval monuments were demolished and reused as building material in the process. The hastiness of the construction, however, resulted in a wall only about 3 metres (9.8 ft) high and less than 1 metre (3.3 ft) thick, rather than a proper fortification. Haseki then promptly presented the Athenians with a bill for 42,500 piastres, ostensibly for the supervisors he had brought from outside. Not only that, but he placed guards at the gates, so that the wall served to virtually imprison the population in their own city. Benizelos also records that in April 1778, the plague broke out in Athens. Although only a few adults died, about 600 children fell victims to it.

=== Third tenure as voivode ===
Haseki returned as voivode in 1779, and exiled many of his Turkish opponents. The situation became so bad that large numbers of Athenians went to Constantinople, including a number of peasants who reportedly took their ploughshares with them and dramatically threw them down in a row before the Grand Vizier, asking the Sultan to give them another place in which to live, for Athens was unbearable. Haseki was exiled to Cyprus, but instead he returned to Athens, and carried on his machinations in Constantinople. As a result, while Haseki was allowed to remain as malikhane sahib, he was removed from the position of voivode and the day-to-day government of the city. In 1781 or 1782, another voivode was appointed over Athens.

=== Fourth tenure as voivode and exile in Constantinople ===
Once again, Haseki's removal did not last long. Metropolitan Bartholomew died in November 1781, and his successor, Benedict, joined with Makfi and Haseki's other allies, and petitioned for his restoration. Haseki returned in late 1782, and his rule became even more tyrannical: he continued the acquisition of properties, and forced the populace to cultivate them. Eventually, Haseki turned against Makfi, his leading Turkish Athenian supporter. The latter fled to Nauplia and thence to Constantinople, but Haseki's agents secured his arrest. Brought in chains to Athens on 22 February 1785, Makfi was killed by drowning in the hold of a ship, on Haseki's orders.

Haseki's exactions managed to unite Greeks and Turks against him; including the powerful Turks Osman Bey, Balitizikos, and Bekir, as well as the Metropolitan Benedict. His crimes were again denounced to the Porte. Some sixty notables, including the Metropolitan, were called to Constantinople to testify. Powerful officials, including the Grand Vizier Koca Yusuf Pasha, the Kapudan Pasha Cezayirli Gazi Hasan Pasha, the Dragoman of the Fleet Nicholas Mavrogenes, and the defterdar (finance minister), turned against Haseki, and his return as voivode was forbidden. Encouraged by this, the Athenians rose up against Haseki and his henchmen: the liberal-minded Turks killed Baptista Vretos, while the Christians burned down four homes belonging to Haseki's partisans, three Christians and one Turk. The populace gathered at the Church of St. Demetrios Tziritis, near the gate of the Holy Apostles and publicly anathematized the Christian primates who were his supporters—Spyros Logothetis, Nikolas Patousas, Dimitrios Kalogeras, Hadji Pantazis, Konstantakis Yannoulis, Dimitrios Astrakaris, Theodoros Kantzilieris, Stavros Vrondogounis Tomaras and Hadji Salonitis—and then convened an assembly that deposed them from the city council, electing others in their stead, including Bellos, who had been a prominent popular leader against Haseki, and Petros Pittakis. The oligarchic system was condemned, and a resolution passed that the primates were to be chosen through elections, rather than through heredity. One of the leading Turks was even chosen as one of the two epitropoi, the agents of the Christian community of the city.

Faced with an array of powerful officials, and the growing power of his enemies in Athens, for the next two years (1786–1788) Haseki remained safely ensconced in the palace of Esma Sultan. During this time, both sides fought a war of bribery and intrigue in the Porte. In Athens, two local leaders, Bellos and Bekir, had emerged, and had through force of arms managed to prevent Haseki's emissary from even entering the city and installing his own candidate as voivode. Haseki for a time managed to obtain the removal of Metropolitan Benedict, but the Athenians sought the help of the British consul, Prokopios Menas. Benedict also bribed the dragoman of the British ambassador to Constantinople, who then secured Benedict's restoration. The Athenians even managed to secure the annulment of Haseki's grant of the malikhane, and its bestowal on the darphane emini (the imperial mint-master); the silahdar (aide-de-camp) of the Kapudan Pasha Cezayirli Hasan, who was considered as well-disposed to the Athenians, was appointed as voivode.

=== Fifth tenure as voivode ===
Haseki's fortunes took a new blow in 1788, when Esma Sultan died, but he soon managed to turn the situation around through judicious bribery of Cezayirli Hasan Pasha, so that the malikhane was restored to him. As soon as the news reached Athens, the oligarchic party seized control. Bellos and Bekir were thrown into prison, and the Metropolitan himself placed under house arrest.

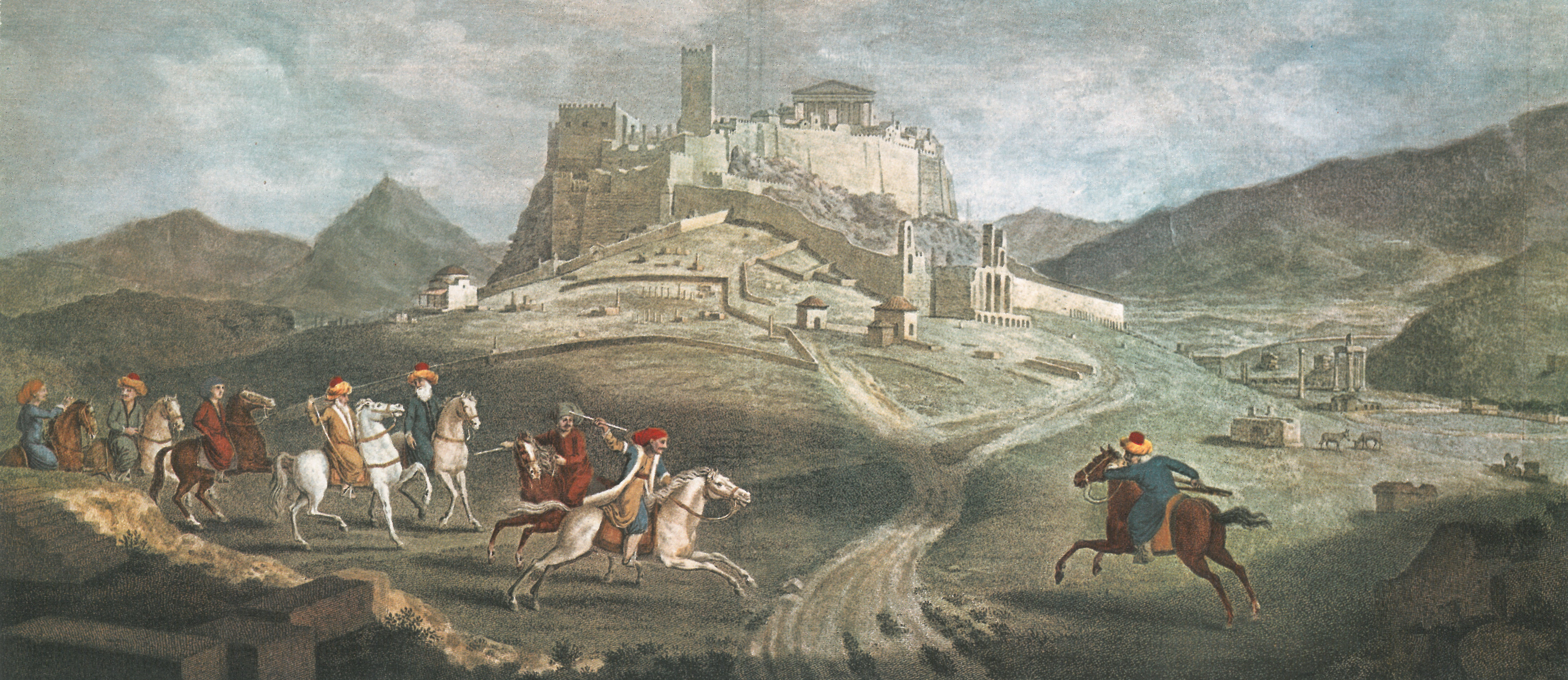
View of the Acropolis in 1787. In the foreground, Turks playing the djirid

Haseki returned on 14 February 1789, not only with his malikhane and the voivodeship restored, but also as acting military governor of the city. His authority was thus absolute, and a veritable reign of terror began. Bellos, Nikolas Barbanos and his brother Sotirios, Petros Pittakis, Osman Bey, Balitzikos, and Bekir, were all hanged, while Avram and Mitros Kechagias were strangled later. One of his leading Turkish opponents was left to hang from the Frankish Tower of the Acropolis. The 24 mid-ranking notables of the city were brought before a row of stakes and threatened with immediate impalement unless they could ransom themselves, and the entire Christian populace was forced to sign a collective promissory note for 400,000 piastres in money and olive oil. Although the day of payment was fixed for six months after, Haseki began to collect the dues immediately, demanding five to 25 pounds (c. 500 piastres) from every citizen, payable in eight days. This proved particularly onerous, forcing many of the poorer citizens to sell their houses and olive yards to provide the money. Some found refuge in flight, but then his share burdened their fellow parishioners who remained behind. According to the contemporary accounts of Benizelos and Skouzes, the voivode "kept for himself all the huge income from the last oil harvest", and demanded from the public twice or thrice his expenses, and his collectors did not hesitate to beat and even kill those who could not pay. Even women were not exempt, and suffered the same as the men, so that the prisons were full. According to Skouzes, who as a boy spent eight days in the prison as a surety for his father's taxes, there were always 150–250 men in the prison, as well as 25–50 women. The men were so tightly packed that there was no room to sit or relieve themselves, and Skouzes describes a smoke "like a black cloud" that went out of the window, from the stink of the place.

Only the three Greek primates, and their followers, who supported Haseki, were exempted from his oppression, and even benefited from it, by buying up the properties of their less fortunate fellow citizens, as did speculators from other parts of the empire. Haseki himself sought to seize property wherever he could. He would either send his own assessors to give a very low estimate of the property's value, or, if the owner were a Christian, simply confiscate it in return for a receipt that he had paid his share of the public promissory note. The Kaisariani Monastery saved itself from expropriation only by arranging to be sold to the Metropolitan of Athens. He amassed a considerable estate, comprising much of the present-day Botanical Gardens, as well as over 12,000 olive trees, according to Skouzes. He built a large country mansion at the beginning of the Sacred Way, called "Tower of Haseki", and kept a large harem of women. The contemporary accounts report of his attempt to include in it the beautiful Ergena, who was forced to flee to Livadeia disguised as a Turk, while her husband, Stamatis Sarris, was beaten so brutally that he remained crippled thereafter.

In 1789 Athens was visited again by the plague, with repeated outbreaks in January and in March–June. At its height, it claimed 30–40 people every day, and one day, as many as 500; by the time it subsided, it had carried off 1,200 Christians and 500 Muslims. Due to the poor harvest of the previous year, and despite the efforts of the primates to procure grain from Boeotia, the plague was followed by a famine. Haseki simply withdrew from the plague to the monastery of St. John on Mount Hymettus, and from there continued to send his agents to summon the citizens to him or collect debts. Haseki was able to profit both from the Porte's preoccupation with the ongoing war with Russia, as well as the support of the primates, who dismissed the complaints lodged against him in Constantinople as "the malicious gossip of mischief-makers". According to Skouzes, "All hope of being saved was gone, for a petition was sent three times to Constantinople, and nothing came of it. The tyrant spent money, and the Athenians paid. When they made a petition, they had to spend money as well as he, but he got his expenses back from them three times over."

=== Downfall, banishment and execution ===
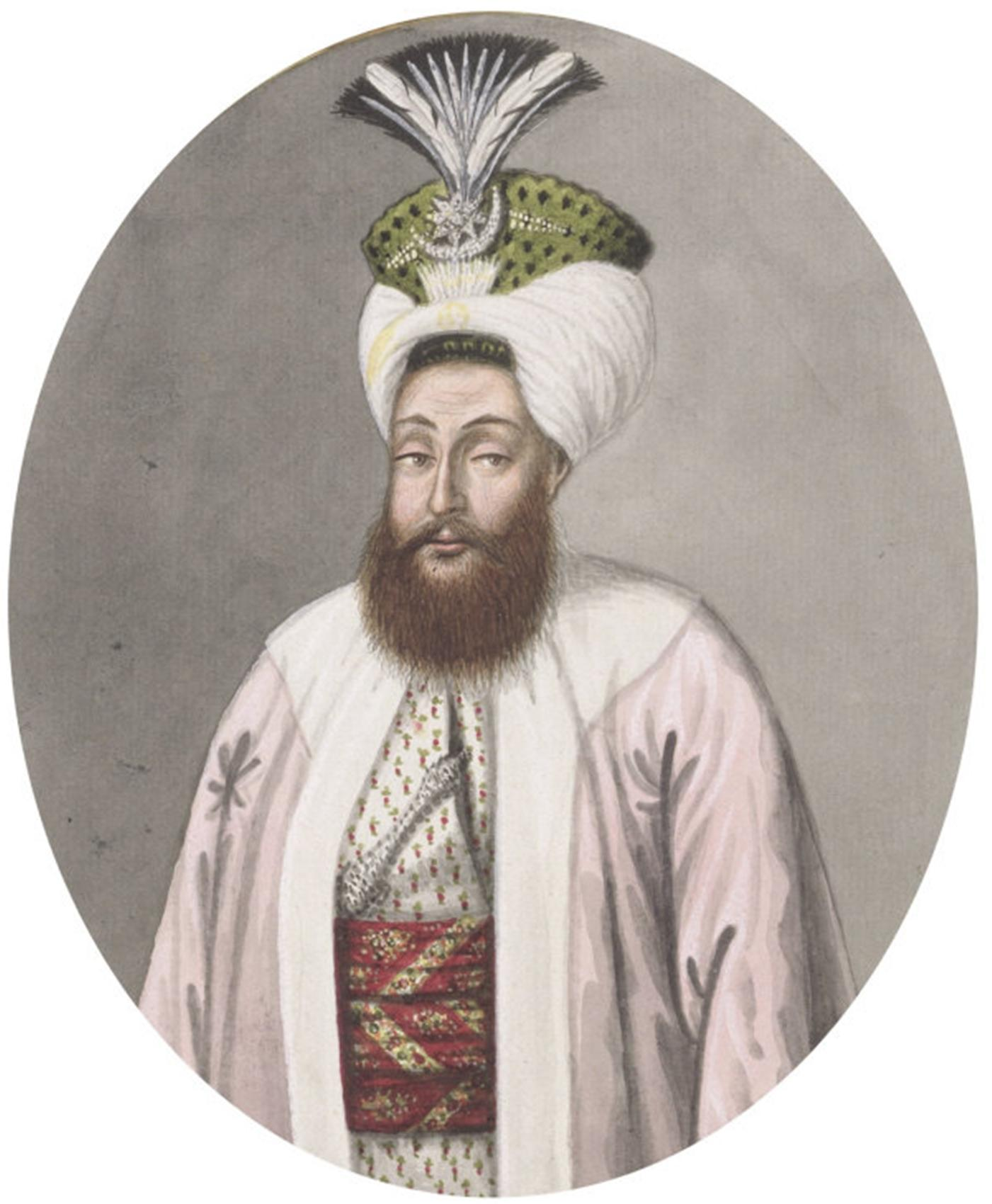
Sultan Selim III

It so happened, however, that Cezayirli Hasan Pasha's former silahdar, whom Haseki had displaced, was appointed as the new pasha of Negroponte. The holders of that office had always endeavoured to interfere in the affairs of Athens, and the new incumbent already had reasons to resent Haseki. When Haseki refused to send men to the war, despite being ordered to do so by the Porte, the pasha sent a body of 300 soldiers, horse and foot, against him. Haseki closed the gates of Athens and repelled the attack, but this armed clash between two Ottoman governors irked Sultan Selim III, who in 1792 expelled both from their provinces. Haseki was banished to Salonica, but quickly returned to Constantinople. With the aid of his supporters there, he secured his right, as malikhane sahib, to send a voivode of his own to Athens in 1793. His agent continued to extract revenue from Athens and send it to him in Constantinople.

Haseki's final downfall came about because of his intrigues in the Sultan's court, where he tried unsuccessfully to undermine the position of the head of the imperial bodyguard in order to replace him. When the latter became aware of Haseki's machinations, he was banished to Chios. Once again, however, Haseki managed to escape his exile, and soon returned to Constantinople. He summoned the Athenian primates there in 1794, and demanded the payment of 200,000 piastres from them. Nevertheless, his position was weakened, and in 1795 the Athenians living in the Ottoman capital encouraged their compatriots to send another deputation to the Porte.

The first to head to Constantinople was Dionysios Petrakis, the abbot of the Monastery of the Taxiarchs, who headed a secret delegation, with Nikos Zitounakis and three others, to see the Valide Sultan Mihrişah, whom Petrakis had once cured of mastitis. Petrakis arranged the subordination of his monastery to the Valide Sultan's charitable vakıf, so that he would be free from Haseki's impositions, and begged the Valide Sultan to intervene in favour of Athens, whose terrible condition under Haseki's rule he described to her. She referred him to Çelebi Efendi, head of the military treasury. When Haseki learned of Petrakis' presence in Constantinople, he invited him to his residence, and put poison in his coffee. The abbot, suspicious, did not drink much of the coffee, and vomited the little he had drunk as soon as he left; the poison nevertheless caused his beard to fall off and his teeth to be harmed.

As soon as he had recovered, the abbot joined with an Athenian delegation, composed of the primates Nikolas Patousas, Stavros Vrondogounis, and Spyridon Palaiologos, who carried recommendatory letters in Turkish and Greek, to ask for Haseki's expulsion. The Athenians lodged complaints with the Patriarch and with other high officials, along with judicious bribes to ensure favourable reception. Haseki was finally banished to Kos, where soon after he was executed. His head was sent to be publicly displayed in front of the Topkapi Palace in Constantinople. According to the Prussian diplomat Jakob Salomon Bartholdy, however, he was assassinated by a çavuş in the employ of the Grand Vizier, who saw in him a potential rival.

After his execution, Haseki's fortune was confiscated by the Selim III, who assigned it to the newly founded irad-ı cedid treasury, intended to support his reformist efforts. The treasury put Haseki's properties up for auction, and the Greek community of Athens acquired his mansion for use as the governor's residence. As the Athenians had been left impoverished, most of the estates auctioned off went to a handful of individuals, including a few Athenians who had fled abroad and had some money to spare. According to Skouzes, most were bought by the head of the Ottoman chancery, the nişancı, and by the Valide Sultan, who turned them once again into vakıfs of the holy cities; from 1796 on the latter were rented by Dionysios Petrakis.

== Sources ==
- Artan, Tülay (1996). "Periods and problems of Ottoman (women's) patronage on the Via Egnatia". In Zachariadou, Elizabeth (ed.). The Via Egnatia Under Ottoman Rule (1380–1699). Halcyon Days in Crete, II: A Symposium Held in Rethymnon 1994. Rethymnon: Crete University Press. pp. 19–43.
- Babinger, Franz (1960). "Atīna". In Gibb, H. A. R.; Kramers, J. H.; Lévi-Provençal, E.; Schacht, J.; Lewis, B. & Pellat, Ch. (eds.). The Encyclopaedia of Islam, Second Edition. Volume I: A–B. Leiden: E. J. Brill. pp. 738–739. OCLC 495469456.
- Freely, John (2004). Strolling through Athens: Fourteen Unforgettable Walks through Europe's Oldest City. Tauris Parke Paperbacks. ISBN 978-1-85043-595-2.
- Kominis, Markos (2008). Η Αθήνα κατά τα τελευταία χρόνια της Οθωμανικής Διοίκησης (18ος-19ος αιώνας) – Η πόλη και το διοικητικό καθεστώς [Athens during the last years of Ottoman Administration (18th–19th century) – The city and the administrative regime] (PDF) (Post-graduate Degree Thesis). Aristotle University of Thessaloniki.
- Miller, William (1921). The Turkish restoration in Greece, 1718-1797. London and New York: Society for Promoting Christian Knowledge, The Macmillan Company.
- Sicilianos, Demetrios (1960). Old and new Athens (Abridged ed.). Putnam.
- Skouzes, Panagiotis (1948). Georgios Valetas (ed.). Χρονικό της σκλαβωμένης Αθήνας στα χρόνια της τυρανίας του Χατζαλή, γραμμένο στα 1841 από τον αγωνιστή Παναγή Σκουζέ [Chronicle of enslaved Athens in the years of Hadj-Ali's tyranny, written in 1841 by the fighter Panagis Skouzes] (in Greek). Athens: Α. Κολολού.
- Vryonis, Speros (2002). "The Ghost of Athens in Byzantine and Ottoman Times". Balkan Studies: Biannual Publication of the Institute for Balkan Studies. 43 (1): 5–115. ISSN 2241-1674.
