= Katharina Thiersch =

German monument conservator (1938–2021)

Katharina Thiersch (born 7 October 1938 – 10 October 2021) was a German monument conservator.

== Education ==
Thiersch was born in Marburg, the daughter of the city conservator of Wiesbaden. She first completed an internship in a carpenter workshop, then studied architecture at RWTH Aachen from 1959, which she completed with an engineering diploma in 1967. She then spent a two-year scholarship at the Bibliotheca Hertziana in Rome.

== Profession ==
She then worked at the Institute for Building History and Building Recording at the University of Stuttgart and from 1973 as a conservator at the Hesse State Office for the Preservation of Monuments and its branch office in Marburg, where she remained until her retirement in 2003. Most recently, she worked as chief conservator.

Thiersch was committed to monument conservation in northern Hesse. Outstanding projects that she supervised were the Haydau Monastery in Morschen, the Church of the Dead in Schwalmstadt-Treysa or the St Peter's Cathedral in Fritzlar. It set new standards in the preservation of historical monuments, in the preliminary investigation, realisation and documentation. 2] The urban planning She accompanied the urban planning redevelopments in Fritzlar, Melsungen, Spangenberg and Schwalmstadt.

In addition, Katharina Thiersch was one of the driving forces behind the establishment of the "German Centre for Craftsmanship and Monument Conservation - Propstei Johannesberg" (today: Propstei Johannesberg gGmbH) in the Propstei Johannesberg in Fulda as a training centre for teaching historical craftsmanship techniques, regional use of materials and building technology. She also worked there as a lecturer. She was also involved in the Hessian Academy of Research and Planning in Rural Areas. She held teaching positions at the Gießen and Kassel universities.

With her commitment, she even made it onto the float of a carnival parade.

When she retired, she was awarded the Badge of Honour of the City of Fritzlar for her services to the renovation of the old town. For her special achievements, she was honoured in 2004 by Federal President Horst Köhler awarded her the Federal Cross of Merit First Class. In retirement, Katharina Thiersch was active at association level until shortly before her death and was a sought-after guest lecturer and speaker.

== Literature ==
=== On Katharina Thiersch ===
- Gerd Weiß: Denkmalpflege war "ihre Sache" - Zum Tod von Katharina Thiersch. In: Denkmal Hessen 2021/2, p. 70f.

=== Publications (selection) ===
- Rainer Humbach: Der Fritzlarer Dom. With a documentation appendix by Burghard Preusler, Katharina Thiersch and Ulrich Knapp. M. Imhoff, Petersberg 2005, ISBN 3-932526-53-8
- together with Reinhard Gross (ed.): Kloster, Schloss und Domäne Heydau: Baugeschichte - Sanierungskonzept - Wiederherstellung = Arbeitshefte des Landesamtes für Denkmalpflege Hessen 1. Theiss Verlag, Stuttgart 2002. ISBN 3-8062-1629-0
- together with Karin Kraus: Modellhafte Untersuchung zur Auswirkung von Schadstoffen auf Mörtel sowie beispielhafter Einsatz von Hinterspritz- und Putzergänzungsmörteln am Kloster Heydau. Institute for Stone Conservation, Mainz, 2001.
- Franz Graf Wolff Metternich: Die Erbauung der Peterskirche zu Rom im 16. Jahrhundert. With the collaboration of Hildegard Giess, Hanna Homa and Katharina Thiersch. Schroll, Munich and Vienna 1972. ISBN 3-7031-0296-9
