= Karl Thiersch =

German surgeon

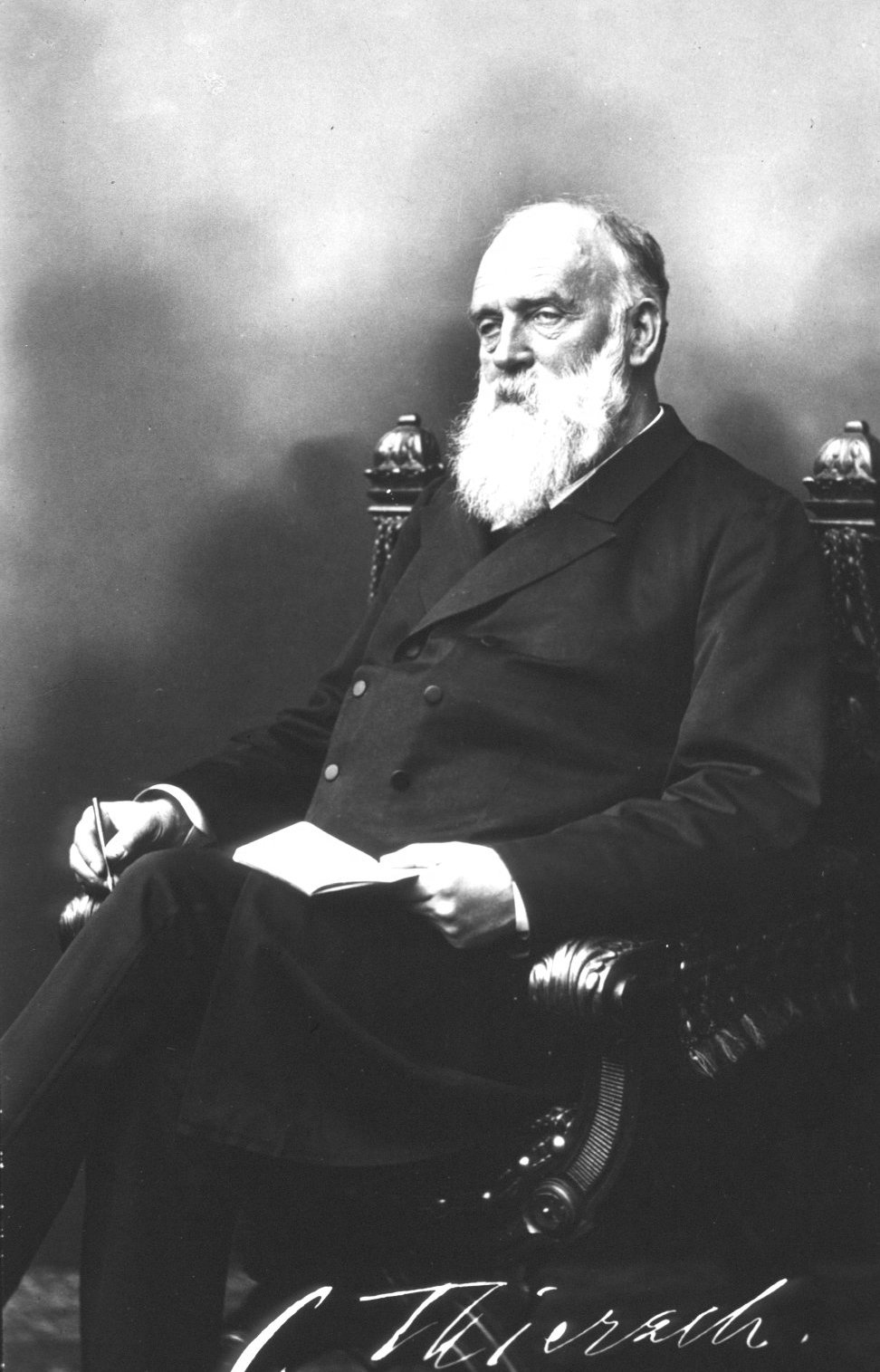
Karl Thiersch (1822–1895)

Karl Thiersch, also spelled Carl Thiersch (20 April 1822 – 28 April 1895), was a German surgeon born in Munich. His father was educationist Friedrich Thiersch, his father-in-law was renowned chemist Justus von Liebig. One brother, Ludwig, was an influential painter, while another, Heinrich Wilhelm Josias, was a theologian.

He received his doctorate from the Ludwig-Maximilians-Universität München in 1843, where from 1848 to 1854 he served as prosector of pathological anatomy. Afterwards he became a professor of surgery at the University of Erlangen (from 1854) and Leipzig University (from 1867). He was a medical surgeon in the First War of Schleswig under Louis Stromeyer (1804–1876), and a medical consultant during the Franco-Prussian War.

In 1865, Thiersch demonstrated the epithelial origin of carcinoma, which put him in opposition to the doctrine of Rudolf Virchow in that a carcinoma could originate from connective tissue. Thiersch's findings were thus agreed upon by research done by Wilhelm von Waldeyer-Hartz (1836–1921) at the University of Breslau. He is also credited with modifying Joseph Lister's technique of antiseptic sterilization by substituting salicylic acid for carbolic acid. In addition, he made contributions involving wound healing treatment and in research of phosphorus necrosis of the jaw.

His name is associated with "Thiersch's graft", a method of split-skin grafting that he developed. This graft is sometimes referred to as an Ollier–Thiersch graft (named with French surgeon Louis Léopold Ollier).

== Selected publications ==
- Infectionsversuche an Thieren mit dem Inhalte des Choleradarmes Munich, 1856. (won a prize from the French Academy in 1867)
- De maxillarum necrosi phosphorica; Leipzig, 1867.
- Der Epithelialkrebs, namentlich der Haut. Eine anatomisch-klinische Untersuchung (with atlas), Leipzig, 1865
- Klinische Ergebnisse der Lister'schem Wundbehandlung und über den Ersatz der Carbolsäure durch Salicylsäure In: Richard von Volkmann's Sammlung klinischer Vorträge, Leipzig, nos. 84, 85.
