= Cleonice (genus) =

Scientific classification
- Kingdom: Animalia
- Phylum: Arthropoda
- Clade: Pancrustacea
- Class: Insecta
- Order: Diptera
- Family: Tachinidae
- Subfamily: Tachininae
- Tribe: Ernestiini
- Genus: Cleonice; Robineau-Desvoidy, 1863

Synonyms
- Grisdalemyia Curran, 1926; Psiloneura Aldrich, 1926; Steinia Brauer & von Berganstamm, 1893; Steiniella Berg, 1898

Genus of flies

Cleonice is a genus of flies in the family Tachinidae.

== Species ==
- Cleonice aldrichi (Curran, 1926)
- Cleonice bigelowi (Curran, 1926)
- Cleonice callida (Meigen, 1824)
- Cleonice keteli Ziegler & Menzel, 2000
- Cleonice nitiduscula (Zetterstedt, 1859)
- Cleonice setosa (Reinhard, 1937)
