= Friedrich Thiersch =

German classical scholar (1784–1860)

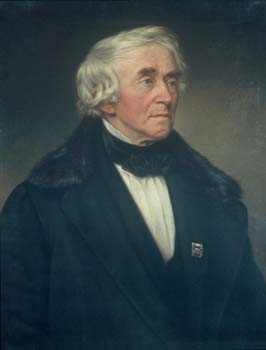
Friedrich Thiersch

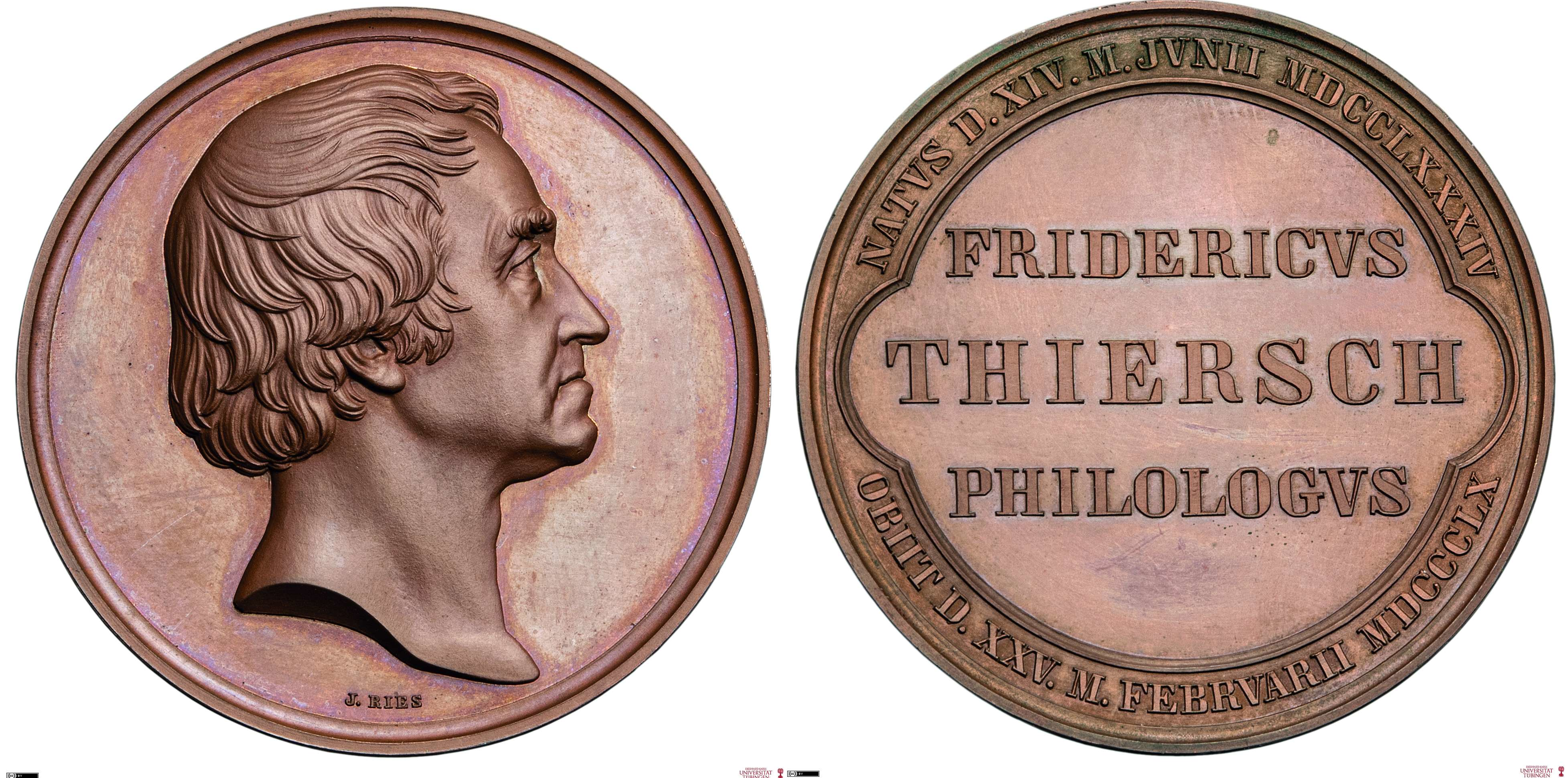
Medal Friedrich Wilhelm Thiersch 1860

Friedrich Wilhelm Thiersch (17 June 1784 – 25 February 1860) was a German classical scholar and educator.

== Biography ==
He was born at Kirchscheidungen (now a part of Laucha an der Unstrut, Saxony-Anhalt). In 1809, he became professor at the gymnasium in Munich, and in 1826 professor of ancient literature at the Ludwig-Maximilians-Universität in Landshut; he was transferred in that year to Munich where he remained until his death. Thiersch, the "tutor of Bavaria" (praeceptor Bavariae), found an extremely unsatisfactory system of education in existence. There was a violent feud between the Protestant "north" and the Catholic "south" Germans; Thiersch's colleagues, chiefly old monks, offered violent opposition to his reforms, and an attempt was made upon his life. His plans were nevertheless carried out, and became the governing principle of the educational institutions of Bavaria.

Thiersch was an ardent supporter of Greek independence. In 1832, he visited Greece, and his influence is said to have helped secure the throne of the newly created kingdom for Otto of Greece. He wrote a Greek grammar, a metrical translation of Pindar, and an account of Greece (L'état actuel de la Grece) in 1833. He was elected a Foreign Honorary Member of the American Academy of Arts and Sciences in 1855.

Thiersch died in Munich. He is buried in the Alter Südfriedhof in Munich. After his death the Bayerische Akademie der Wissenschaften commissioned a bronze medal made by the engraver Joahnn Adam Ries in 1860. His biography was written by his son, H. W. J. Thiersch (1866). Another son, Karl Thiersch, was a renowned surgeon, and yet another, Ludwig Thiersch, was an influential painter.
