= Church of the Holy Apostles, Athens =

Church in Athens, Greece

Church of the Holy Apostles
- Holy Apostles of Solaki
- Άγιοι Απόστολοι Σολάκη
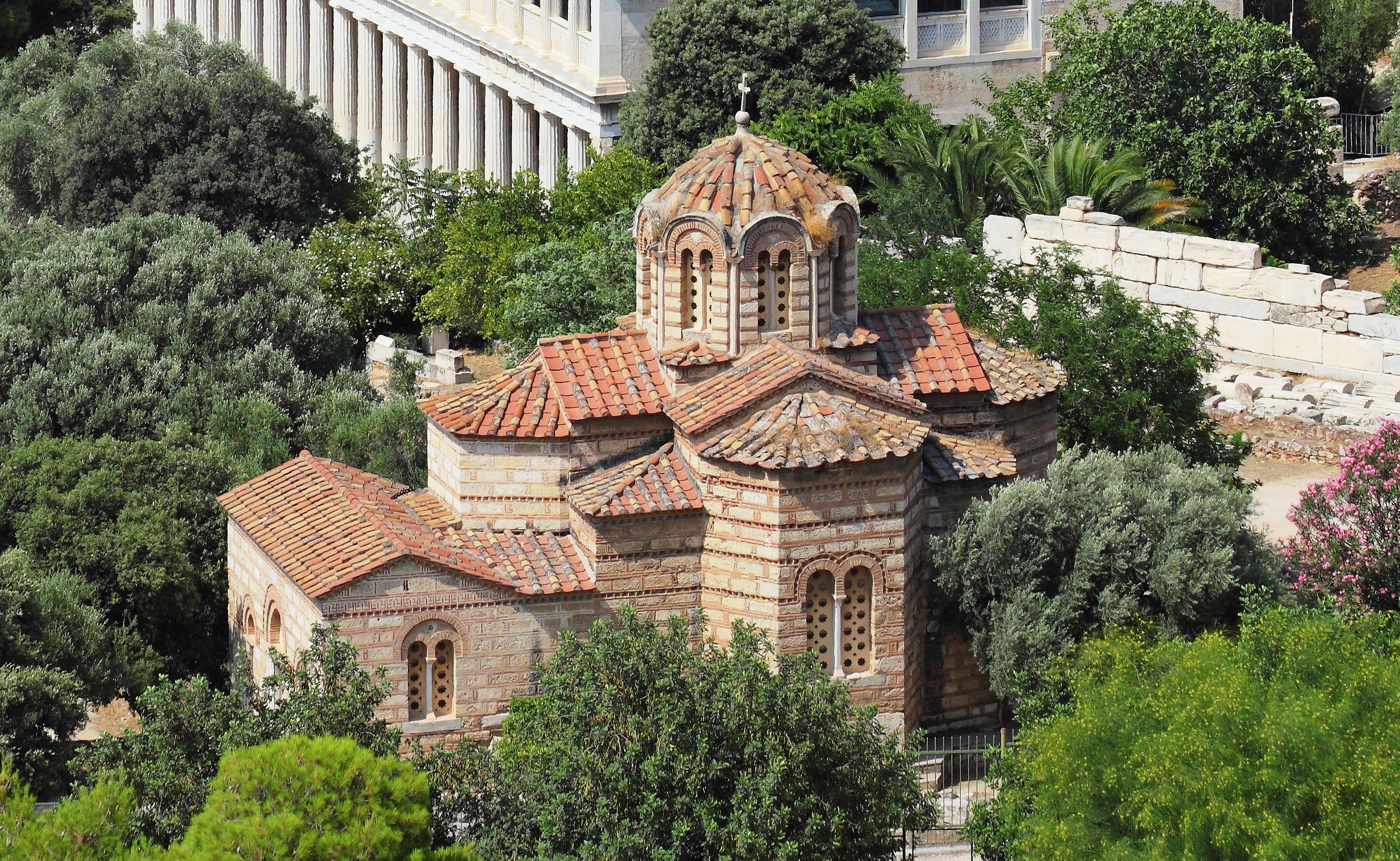
- Church of the Holy Apostles viewed from Acropolis hill
- Church of the Holy Apostles
- 37°58′27″N 23°43′26″E
- Location: Agora of Athens, Greece
- Country: Greece
- Denomination: Eastern Orthodox

Architecture
- Functional status: Intact
- Architectural type: Church
- Style: Byzantine, Athenian type
- Years built: Late 10th century

Specifications
- Materials: Brick

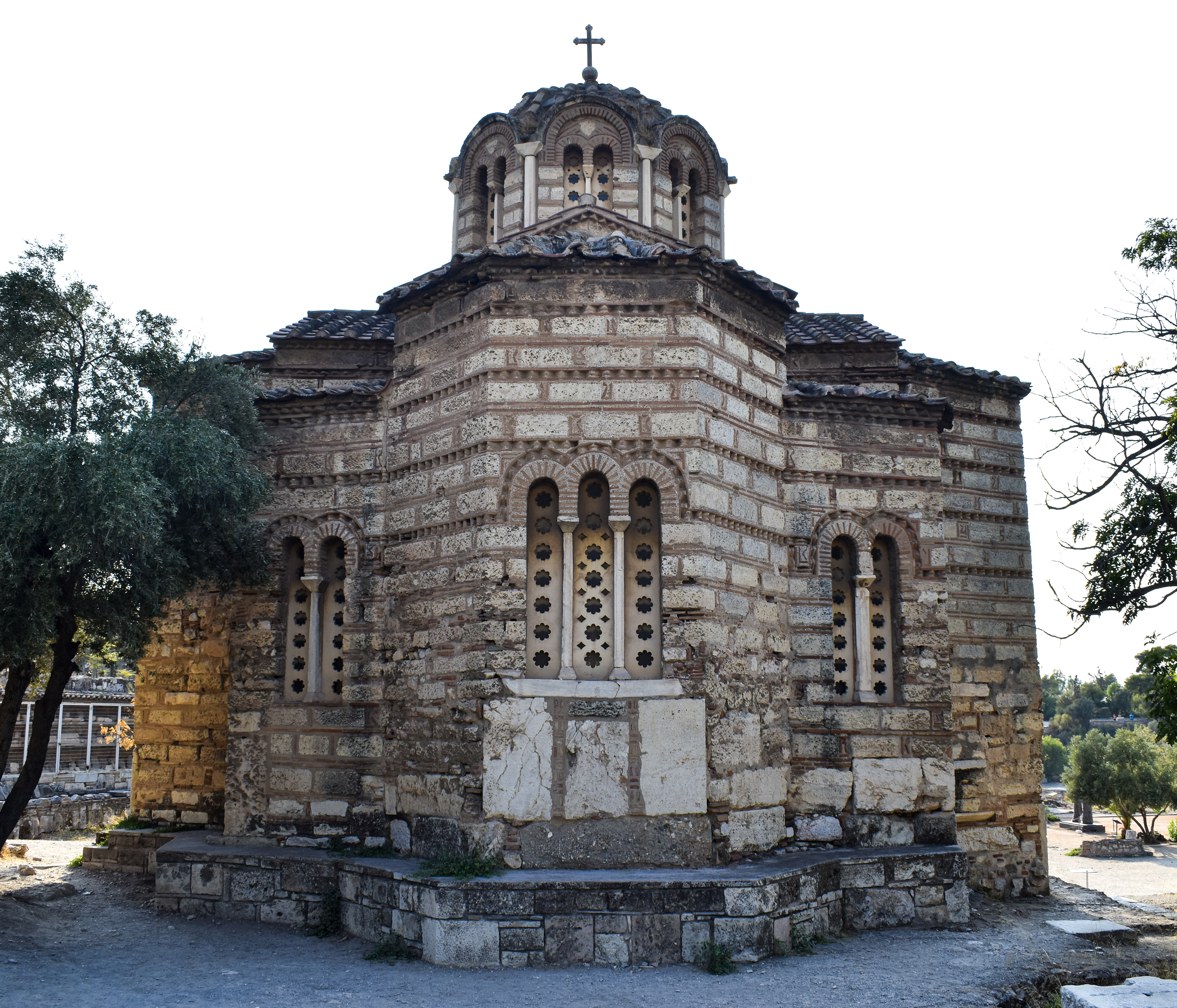
Eastern façade

The Church of the Holy Apostles, also known as Holy Apostles of Solaki, (Greek: Άγιοι Απόστολοι Σολάκη), is located in the Ancient Agora of Athens, Greece, next to the Stoa of Attalos, and can be dated to around the late 10th century.

== History ==
"Solakis" may be the family name of those who sponsored a renovation of the church in the Ottoman Period, or from "Solaki" for the densely populated area around the church in the 19th century.

The church is particularly significant as the only monument in the Agora, other than the Temple of Hephaestus, to survive intact since its foundation, and for its architecture: it was the first significant church of the Middle Byzantine period in Athens, and marks the beginning of the so-called "Athenian type", successfully combining the simple four-pier with the cross-in-square forms. The church was built partly over a 2nd-century nymphaion, and was restored to its original form between 1954 and 1957. From evidence of various repairs and reconstructions, four distinct building phases can be distinguished. The original floorplan is a cross with apses on four sides and a narthex on the west side, with four columns supporting a dome. The altar and floor were originally of marble. Tiles on the outer walls have Kufic-like decorative patterns, a style of decoration common in Middle Byzantine churches.

A few surviving wall paintings in the central aisle date to the 17th century, and paintings from nearby churches were also placed elsewhere within the church.

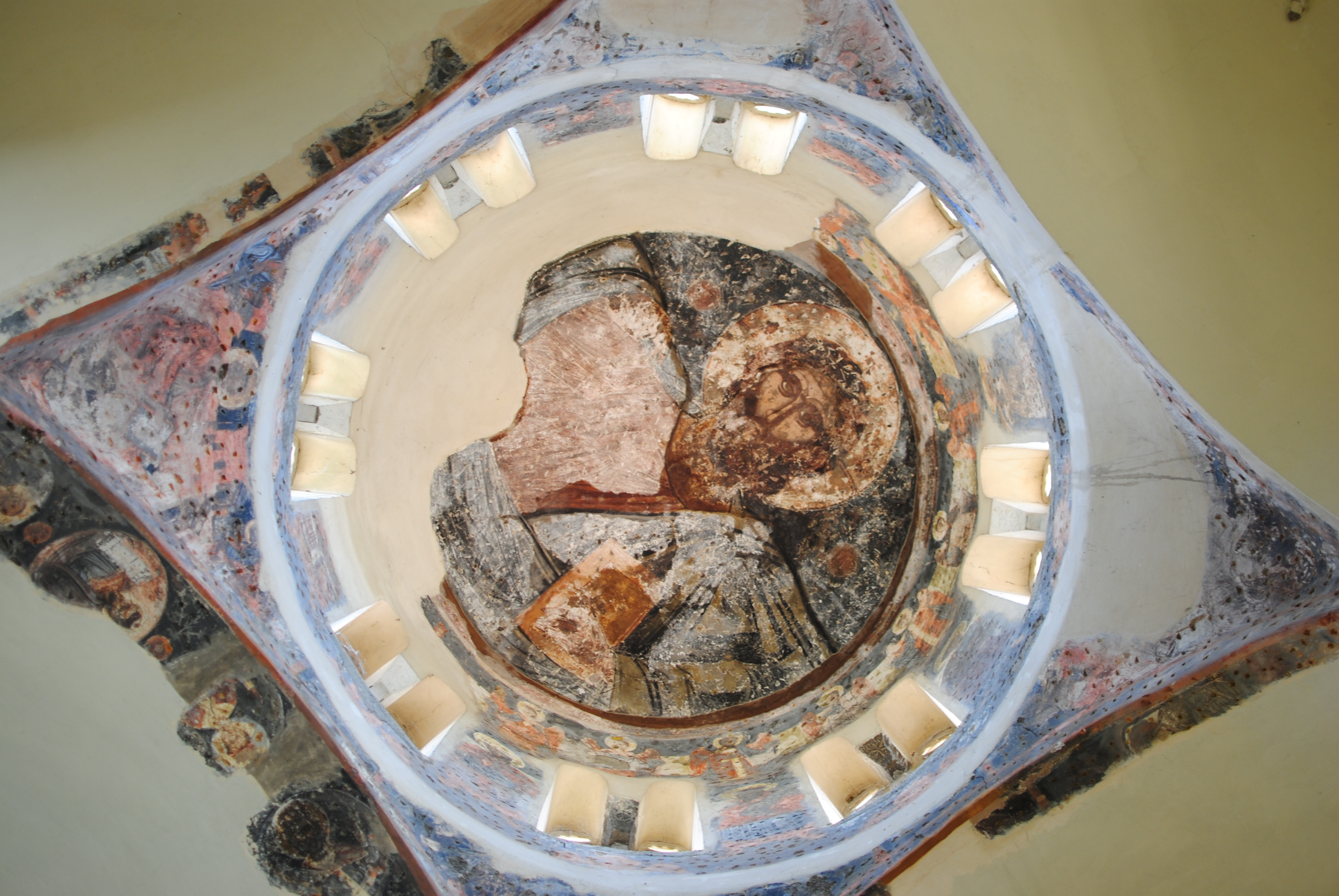
The roof of the church from the inside.

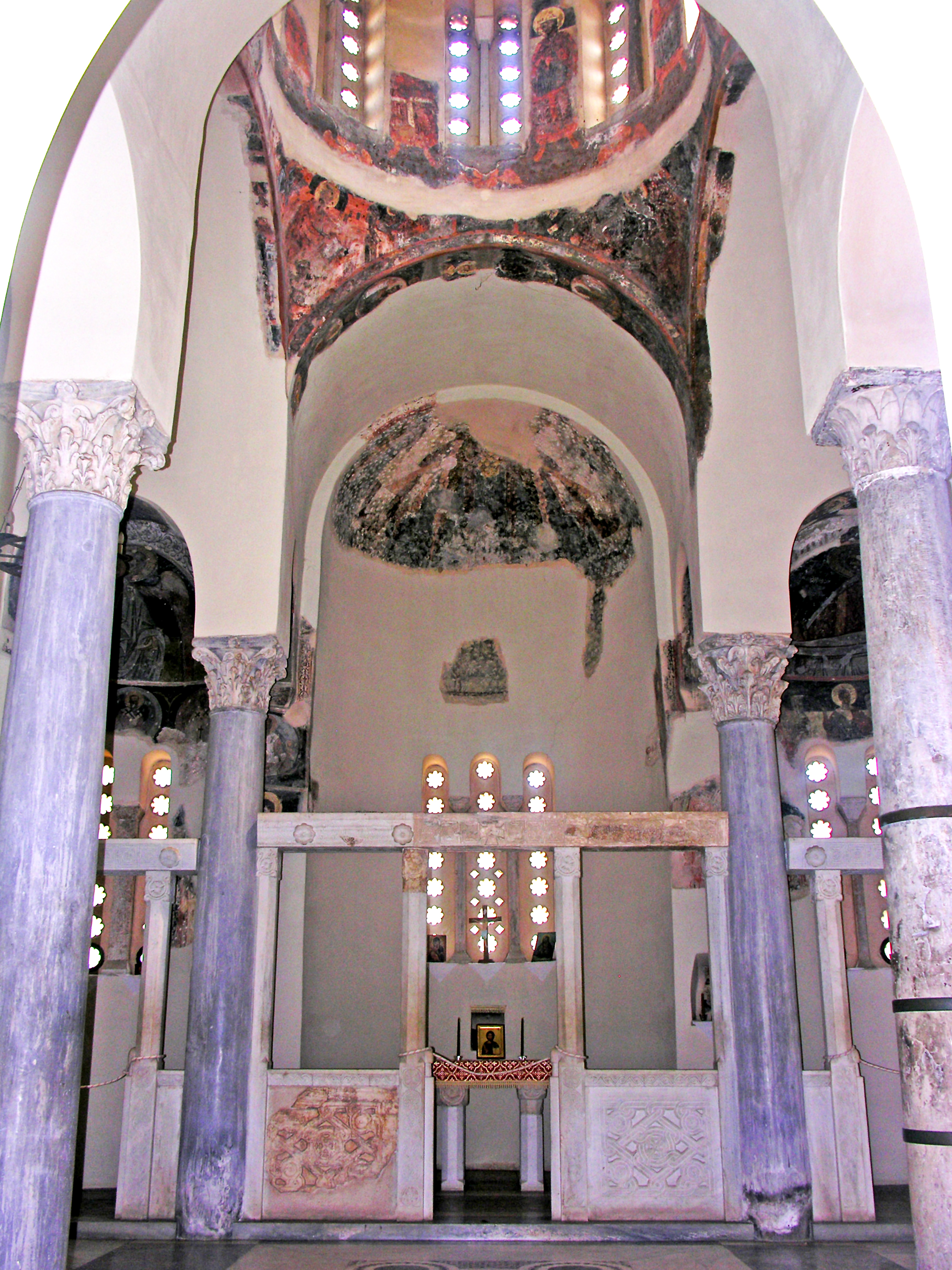
Interior of the Church of the Holy Apostles.

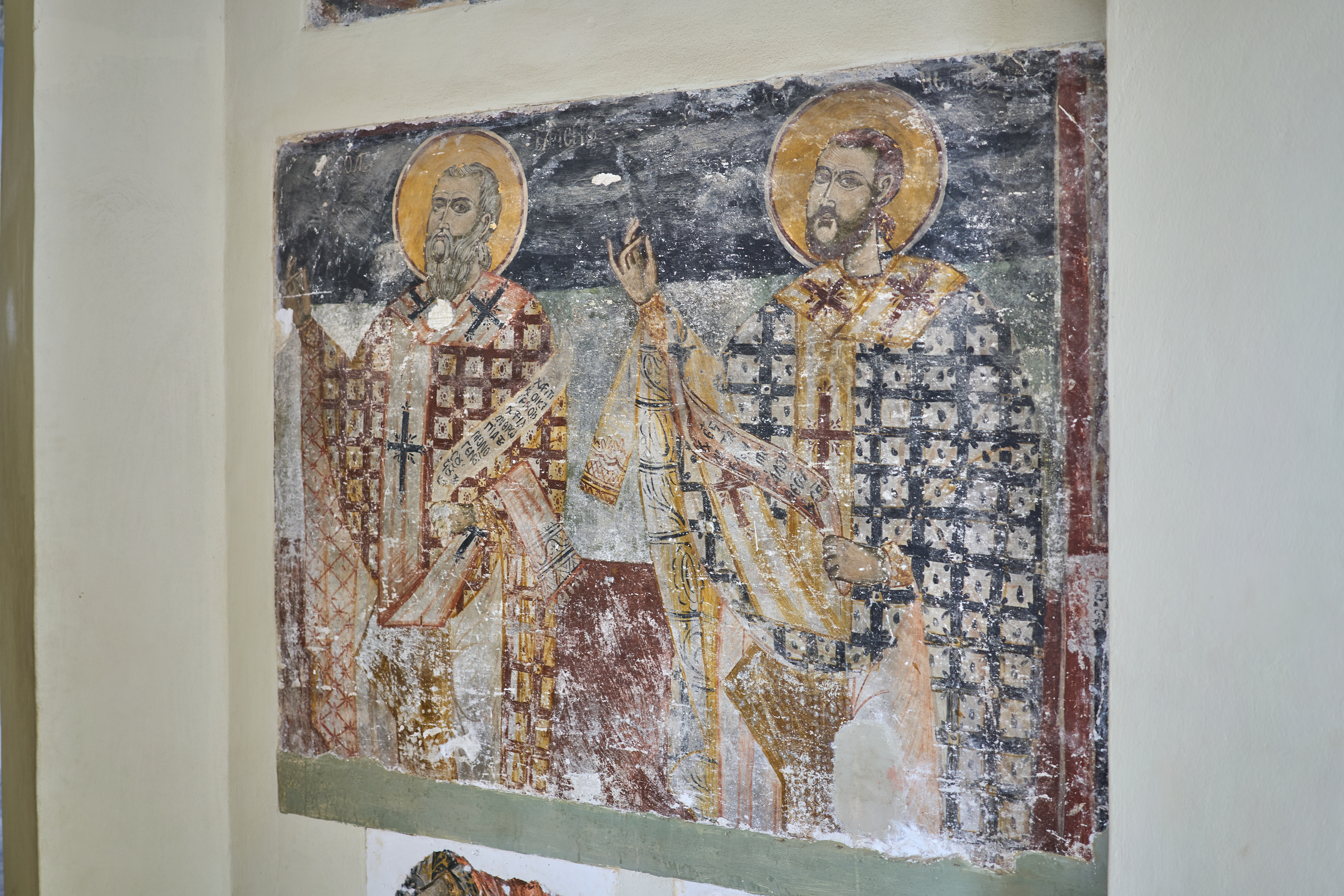
A mural in the Church of the Holy Apostles.
