= Ludwig Thiersch =

German painter (1825–1909)

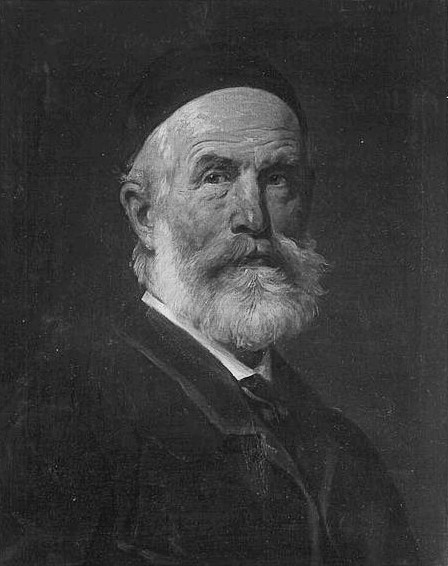
Self-portrait (1888)

Ludwig Thiersch (April 12, 1825 – May 10, 1909) was a German painter, primarily of mythological and religious subjects and especially of ecclesiastical art, also influential in Greece.

== Early life ==
Thiersch was born in Munich, the son of classicist and philhellene Friedrich Thiersch, and brother of surgeon Karl Thiersch and theologian H. W. J. Thiersch. He attended the Academy of Fine Arts, Munich to study sculpture, but after a few years turned to painting, in which he became a student of Heinrich Maria von Hess, Julius Schnorr von Carolsfeld, and Karl Schorn. After the Academy, he painted a depiction of Sakuntala (1848) and a scene of Camisards, and then traveled to Rome, where he sketched scenes from daily Italian life and painted Hiob unter seinen Freunden.

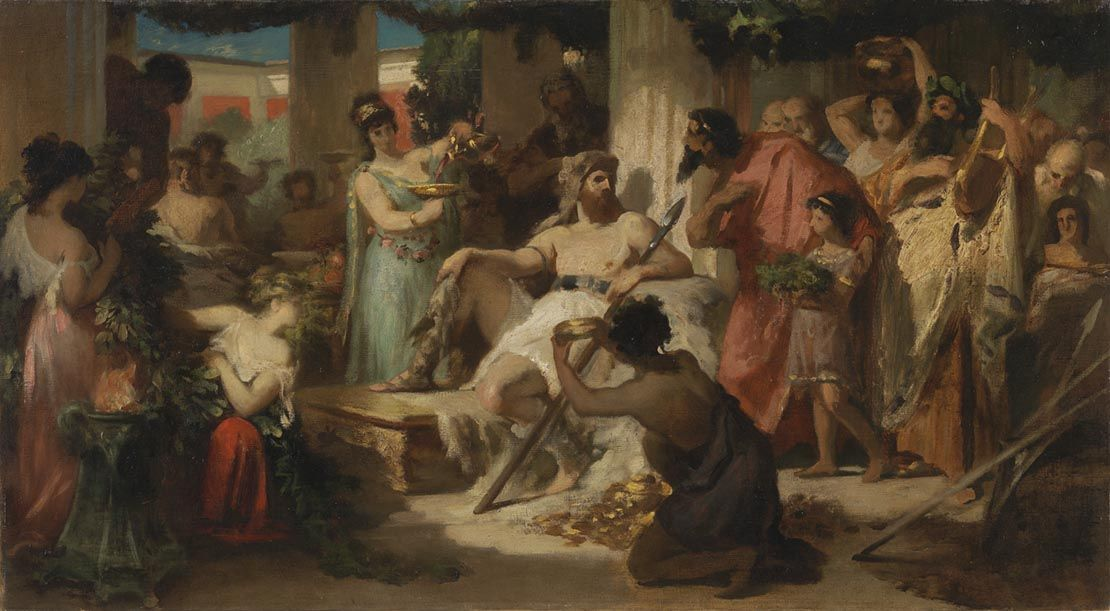
Alaric I in Athens (c.1879)

== In Athens, 1852–1855 ==
In 1852, he traveled with his father to Athens, where he replaced Rafaello Ceccoli (fl.1830s–1850s) at the Athens School of Fine Arts and became interested in Byzantine art. He painted several frescoes in Greek churches, and was at the forefront of a movement to "modernize" Byzantine art by introducing elements from post-Renaissance such as naturalistic perspective and anatomy. In this, he is sometimes credited with discovering Byzantine art for the world of modern art, but such reform was met with fierce opposition from some, who opposed to what they saw as attempts to replace longstanding Greek traditions with foreign ones.

Several newspaper editorials opposed Thiersch's appointment as Professor, and continued to oppose his receipt of commissions to paint church frescoes. However, natural-perspective reforms were favored by the Bavarian monarchy of King Otto, as well as by Lysandros Kaftanzoglou, a prominent architect and head of the Athens Polytechnic, and so his opponents were largely unsuccessful.

Among Thiersch's pupils during his years in Athens was Kleoniki Gennadiou and most notably Nikolaos Gyzis, who would become one of the best-known Greek painters of the 19th century, and who would manage to engage international traditions while still producing art seen as authentically Greek. Thiersch's most notable fresco in Athens is in the Church of Saint Nikodimos.

== Vienna, Rome, Saint Petersburg, Bavaria, and London ==
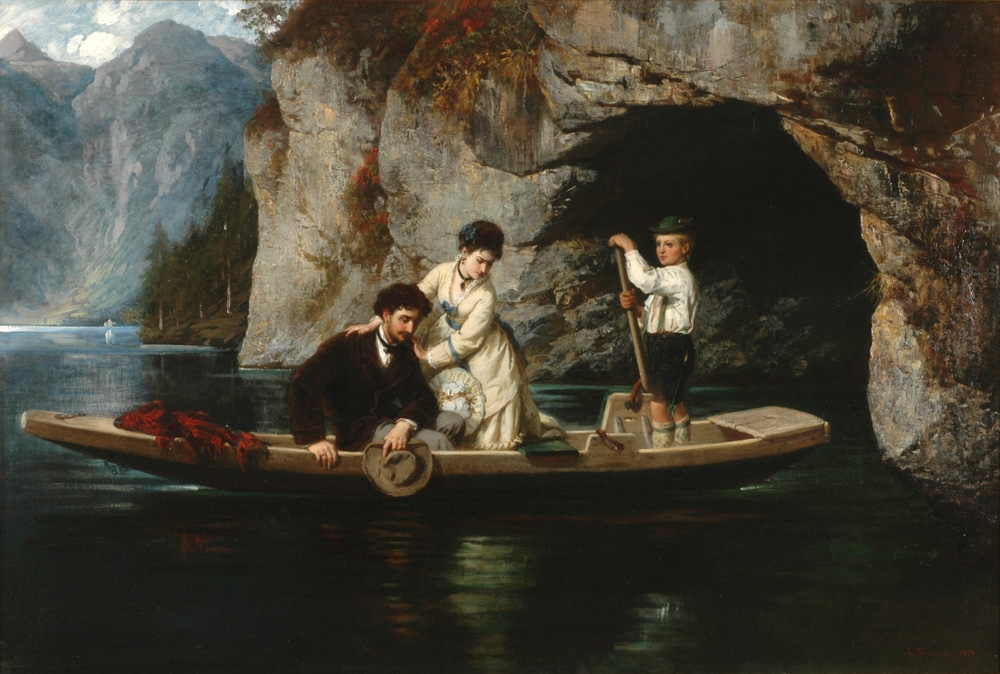
Unergründlich (The Unfathomable), 1874

Through the rest of his life, Thiersch traveled from city to city, being employed alternately to paint church frescoes and to produce oil paintings for private patrons. His church art is particularly notable, and together with Ludwig Seitz and Jean-Hippolyte Flandrin, he is considered to have led a revival in western European ecclesiastical art.

In 1856, Thiersch was appointed to a position in Vienna, where he continued to paint church frescoes. During this period Theophil Freiherr von Hansen, a Danish-Austrian architect who had also spent time in Greece and taken up an interest in Byzantine art, was rebuilding Vienna's Fleischmarkt Greek Church in a neo-Byzantine style, and Thiersch was commissioned along with Karl Rahl to supply frescoes for the interior.

Following the position in Vienna, Thiersch was employed in Rome by Simon Sinas, a Greek philanthropist, for whom he produced a number of works on mythological and religious subjects, including Charon als Seelenführer, Bakchos' Einzug in den Hain von Kolonos, and Thetis' Klage um Achilleus.

In 1860, he went to Saint Petersburg, where he painted frescoes and icons in the chapels of Grand Duke Nicholas and Grand Duke Michael, and in the Protestant Church of Saint Catherine.

After his return to Germany, Thiersch painted Auferweckung der Tochter des Jairus und Christus in Gethsemane (1866) for the Stiftskirche in Kempten, as well as Predigt des Paulus auf dem Areopag, and in the following years a number of other works, including Christus am Teich Bethesda, Ceres, die ihre Tochter sucht, Christus in der Wüste, Alarich in Athen als Sieger gefeiert, and Kreuztragung Christi.

Some years later, Thiersch painted the icons in the iconostasis of the Greek Orthodox Cathedral of St. Sophia in London (consecrated 1882), and of St. Stephen's Greek Orthodox Church in Paris (consecrated 1895).

== Sources ==
- Bianco, Don (September 2002). "Treasured Offerings: The Legacy of the Greek Orthodox Cathedral of St Sophia, Moscow Road". Friends of West Norwood Cemetery Newsletter, No 45. Archived from the original on 2007-09-27.
- Danos, Antonis (2002). "The Culmination of Aesthetic and Artistic Discourse in Nineteenth-century Greece: Periklis Yannopoulos and Nikolaos Gyzis". Journal of Modern Greek Studies. 20 (1): 75–112. doi:10.1353/mgs.2002.0005. hdl:20.500.14279/1809. S2CID 144866705.
- Kyriakos, Anastasios Diomedes (1902). Geschichte der orientalischen Kirchen von 1453-1898 (in German). Gerstenberg.
- Lydakis, Stelios (1976). Istoria tis Neoellinikis Zographikis (History of Modern Greek Painting) (in Greek). Athens: Melissa.
- Pollali, Aggeliki (1998). "An Overview of Greek Painting in the 19th c." Anistoriton. E984.
- "Thiersch". Meyers Konversations-Lexikon (in German). Vol. 15 (4th ed.). 1890. pp. 654–655.
- "Wien (Kirchen, Profanbauten)". Meyers Konversations-Lexikon (in German). Vol. 16 (4th ed.). 1890. p. 604.
