= H. W. J. Thiersch =

German theologian (1817-1885)

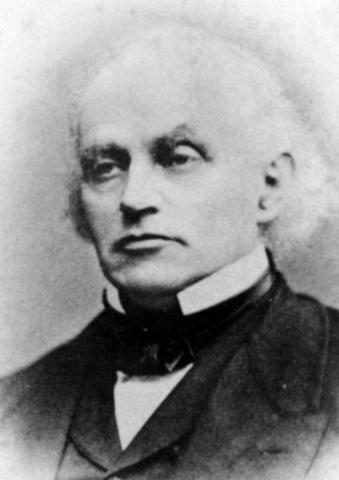
H. W. J. Thiersch (date unknown)

Heinrich Wilhelm Josias Thiersch (November 5, 1817 – December 3, 1885), usually known as H. W. J. Thiersch, was a German Evangelical theologian and philologist, who served as a minister in the short-lived Catholic Apostolic Church.

== Early life ==
Thiersch was born in Munich, the son of well-known classicist Friedrich Thiersch, and brother of surgeon Karl Thiersch and painter Ludwig Thiersch. He studied philology at the Ludwig-Maximilians-Universität München from 1833 to 1835, primarily under his father but also under Friedrich Wilhelm Joseph Schelling and Joseph Görres. He switched to theology and moved to the University of Erlangen, where from 1835 to 1837, he studied under Hermann Olshausen and Gottlieb von Harless, and then at the University of Tübingen from 1837 to 1838, ending with a degree in theology.

He was a lecturer at Erlangen from 1839, and then professor of theology at Marburg University from 1843. Among his early work, his 1841 monograph De Pentateuchi Versione Alexandrine (The Pentateuch Versions of Alexandria) is credited with being among the first to point out the importance of recently discovered papyri for research on the Septuagint.

== Conversion to the Catholic Apostolic Church ==
As early as 1836, Thiersch had become interested in the Catholic Apostolic Church ("Irvingism"). In 1847, he converted, and in 1850 resigned his professorship to dedicate himself as a minister in that church. He lived in various cities ministering to the scattered Irvingite congregation, including Marburg, Munich, Augsburg, and Basel. He was a lecturer at Marburg University from 1853 to 1858, but otherwise held no permanent positions in his later life due to his religious heterodoxy.

The 1911 New Schaff-Herzog Encyclopedia of Religious Knowledge described his life following conversion as follows:

Thiersch was a man of sincere and profound piety, of rare classical, theological, and general culture, an enthusiastic teacher, and might have become the successor of Neander in Berlin; but, in obedience to what he believed to be a divine call, he sacrificed a brilliant academic career to his religious convictions. He lived in poverty and isolation. He was lame; but had a very striking, highly intellectual and spiritual countenance, and an impressive voice and manner. He was the most distinguished German convert to Irvingism. He sincerely believed that the Lord had restored the apostolic office and the prophetic gifts of the Apostolic Church in the Irvingite community; and, notwithstanding the apparent failure of the movement, he adhered to it till his death.
