= Karl Ledderhose =

German civil servant (1821–1899)

Karl Heinrich Ludwig Ledderhose
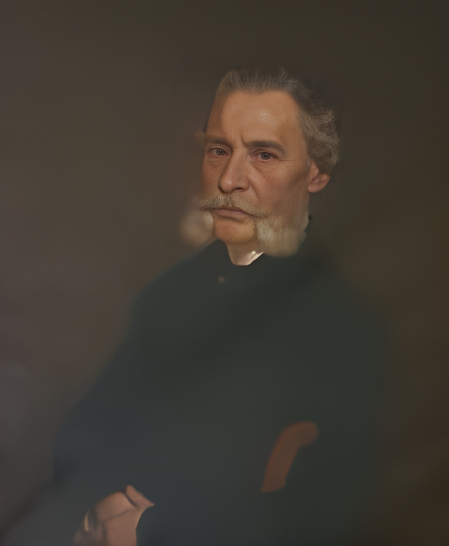
- Karl Ledderhose as Rector of the University of Strasbourg
- Born: Karl Heinrich Ludwig Ledderhose; March 26, 1821; Hanau, Electorate of Hesse, Holy Roman Empire
- Died: January 2, 1899 (aged 77); Strasbourg, Alsace–Lorraine, German Empire
- Occupations: Lawyer, finance minister, university rector, Bezirkspräsident
- Years active: 1844-1899
- Spouses: Wilhelmine Justine Charlotte Pfeiffer (m. 1853; died 1892) Emilie Henriette Charlotte Bachfeld, née Thudichum (m. 1893)
- Relatives: Georg Ledderhose (son); Lothar Ledderose (great-grandson)
- Awards: Knight, Order of the Red Eagle; Knight, Royal Order of the Crown; Commander, Order of the Zähringer Lion

Karl Heinrich Ludwig Ledderhose (26 March 1821 – 1 January 1899) was a German jurist, civil servant, and university administrator whose career spanned the political transitions from the Electorate of Hesse to Prussian and Imperial German rule. Educated at the Universities of Marburg and Göttingen, he entered public service in Kassel as an assessor and rose through the Hessian judiciary before transferring to Prussian administration after the annexation of Hesse in 1866.

In 1868 he became Bezirkspräsident (district president) of Strasbourg in the newly acquired territory of Alsace-Lorraine, where he oversaw the reorganization of local governance and public institutions following the Franco-Prussian War. When the Kaiser-Wilhelm-Universität was founded there in 1872, Ledderhose played a central role in its establishment as the first rector, directing the acquisition of faculty, the drafting of permanent statutes, and the initiation of building projects for teaching and research.

After 1879 he served as vice-president of the Imperial Territory of Alsace-Lorraine (Reichsland Elsaß-Lothringen) and later as a senior official (Vortragender Oberfinanzrat) in the Prussian Ministry of Finance in Berlin. His administrative career reflected the Prussian model of academically trained jurists moving between provincial and central posts, and he was regarded for his efficiency and moderation during the politically sensitive integration of Alsace into the Empire.

Ledderhose retired in 1895 and died in Strasbourg in 1899. He was awarded the Order of the Red Eagle and other decorations for his service. Though largely forgotten today, his work helped shape the civil administration and academic infrastructure of Imperial Germany’s western provinces in the late nineteenth century.

== Early life and career in Hesse ==
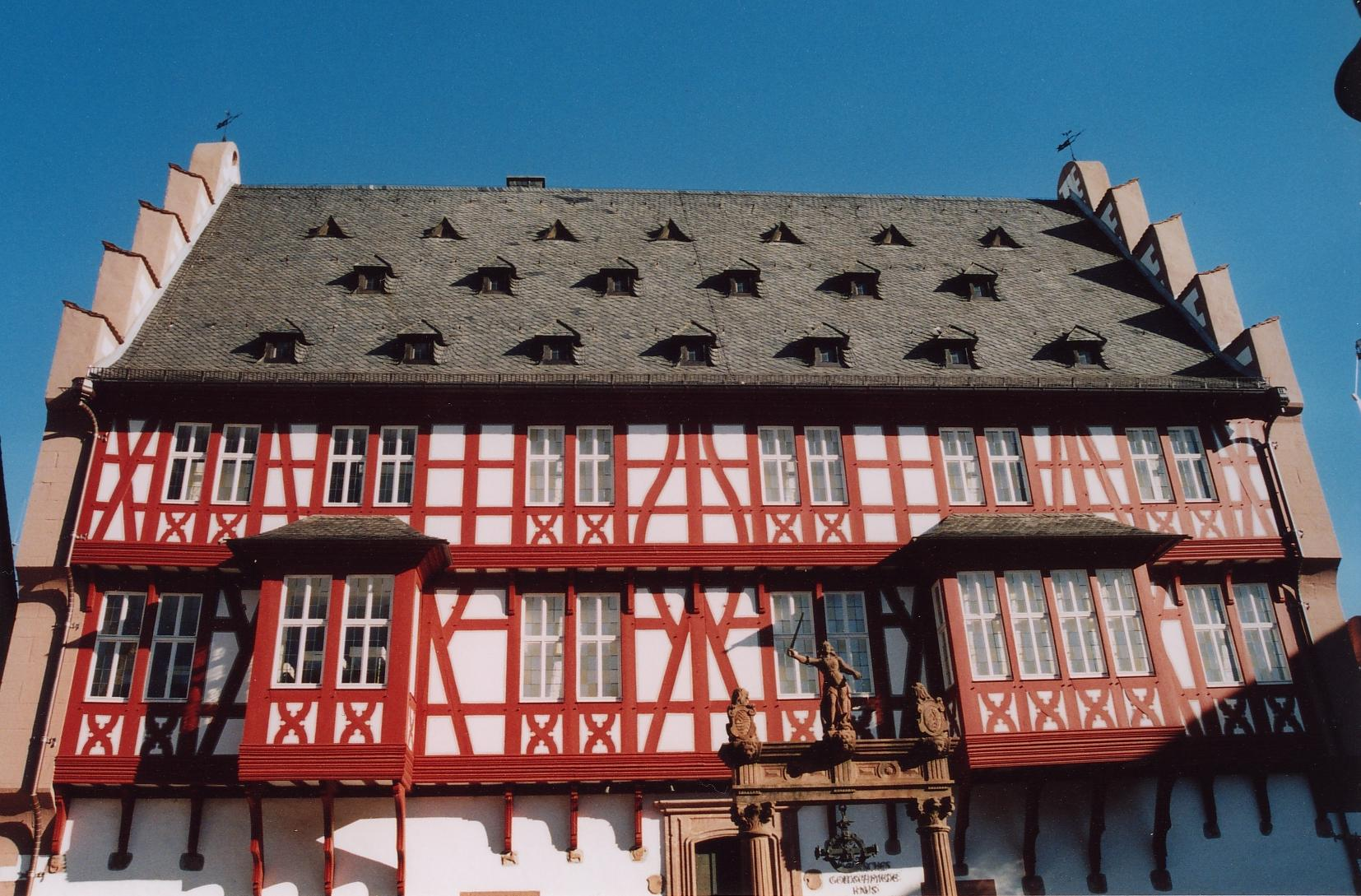
The Old Town Hall of Hanau, where both Karl and his father worked.

Karl Ledderhose was the son of Gustav Ledderhose (1772–1841) and Sophie Susanna (née Dupré; 1777–1862). Gustav Ledderhose was a legislator in the city of Hanau, then part of the Electorate of Hesse. He received his education at the Collegium Carolinum in Kassel, but there is no evidence that he attended any institute of higher education. He worked initially as a secretary for the Lutheran consistorial government in Hanau, but eventually rose to the rank of senior civil servant (German: Regierungsrat). Gustav would go on to maintain his role as government minister for almost two decades, but little is known of the specifics of his acts or positions as a politician. He also served as the director of the Hanau Leihbank. Ledderhose's mother, Susanna, was descended from a Huguenot family that settled in Hesse fleeing persecution in France during the previous century.

After initial schooling in Hanau and Kassel, Ledderhose was sent to the University of Marburg and Heidelberg University to study natural philosophy and law. He graduated from Heidelberg on 9 May 1840, under tutelage of Karl Ullmann. Ledderhose first appears in professional life in 1844, as a legal intern at the Hanau District Court. From 1845 to 1847, he was employed as a referendar at the criminal division of the Hanau High Court. In 1848, Ledderhose was transferred to the high court in Kassel, where he worked as an assessor until 1851. From 1852 to 1855 he performed the role of assistant state prosecutor at the criminal court in Schmalkalden, with a brief return to Kassel for his wedding. The years from 1856 to 1861 found Ledderhose working as a magistrate in the judicial office at Bockenheim (then an independent village, now a part of Frankfurt am Main), and by 1862 his appointment to Chief Finance Councillor and Member of the Upper Mines and Salt Works Directorate saw him and his family back in Kassel. From 1863 to 1866, Ledderhose held the position of Lecturing Council in the Ministry of Finance (German: Vortragende Oberfinanzrath). Following the Austro-Prussian War, in which Hesse sided with the Austrian Empire and lost, the state of Hesse was occupied by the Kingdom of Prussia, and on 22 June 1866, all acting government officials and cabinet members were formally replaced by their highest ranking inferiors. Initially, Ledderhose and his colleague Adolf Etienne refused to take up their new positions, but after they were both threatened with deportation to Spandau prison, they accepted. This meant that, albeit briefly, Ledderhose was raised to the highest rank in the Finance Ministry. From that point until 1867, Ledderhose was the Head of the Ministry of Finance, as well as a member of the State Treasury Directorate. As Prussian control strengthened and the formerly free Hesse was transformed into the Province of Hesse-Nassau by 1868, Ledderhose was made Head of the Department for Direct Taxes, Domains and Forests, which was a particularly important position within Hesse as a newly inducted member of the Zollverein.

== Family ==
On 10 April 1853, Ledderhose married Wilhelmine Justine Charlotte (née Pfeiffer; 1826–1892), known as Minna. She was the daughter of Kassel merchant and banker Johann Georg Heinrich Pfeiffer (1781–1859) and his wife Susanna (née Deines; 1787–1844). Minna's sisters were also married to prominent men in Hesse, most notably the pioneering chemist Friedrich Wöhler and the jurist and parliamentarian Otto Bähr. Another of her sisters was married to their first cousin, Friedrich Wilhelm Ludwig Hermann Deines (1818–1901), and their son, Ledderhose's nephew, was the Prussian Cavalry General Adolf von Deines. Minna Ledderhose's uncles included Burkhard Wilhelm Pfeiffer, Carl Jonas Pfeiffer and Franz Georg Pfeiffer, while her cousins were Louis Pfeiffer and Friedrich Pfeiffer. Her grandfather was the eminent theologian and dean of the University of Marburg's philosophy faculty Johann Jakob Pfeiffer.

- Georg Otto (15 December 1855–1 February 1925), surgeon, professor, and discoverer of glucosamine.
- Hermann (20 March 1857–4 June 1933), followed his father into government in Strasbourg; awarded the Order of the Red Eagle, 4th class, in 1902.
- Gustav (4 April 1862–13 March 1888) died of unknown causes while working as a legal intern in Hagenau.

After the death of his first wife in 1892, Ledderhose married for a second time, and somewhat unconventionally: his second wife was his son Hermann's widowed mother-in-law. On 25 October 1893, Ledderhose was married to Emilie Henriette Charlotte (formerly Bachfeld, née Thudichum; 19 January 1837 - 25 February 1913), the widow of the composer Friedrich Bachfeld (17 February 1814 – 16 December 1890) and mother of Minna Bachfeld, wife of Hermann Ledderhose. The second Mrs. Ledderhose was the daughter of the Hessian politician Ludwig Thudichum.

== Life in Strasbourg ==
=== As a politician ===
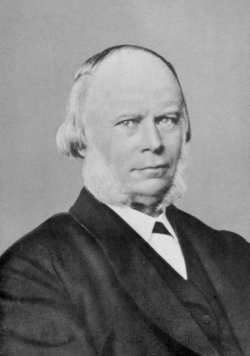
Eduard von Möller

Ledderhose was a protégé and close collaborator of Eduard von Möller, particularly during the transition to Prussian rule, at which time von Möller was named Oberpräsident of the newly formed Prussian Province of Hesse-Nassau. When von Möller was transferred to Strasbourg and named Oberpräsident of Alsace–Lorraine (German: Elsaß–Lothringen) in 1871, he specifically wrote to Chancellor Otto von Bismarck requesting that Ledderhose be made his vice-president. By 1875, due to an increasing personality clash between von Möller and the District President (German: Bezirkspräsident) of the Unterelsaß District, Adolf Ernst von Ernsthausen, von Moeller requested that Bismarck transfer von Ernsthausen to Colmar and make him the District President of Oberelsaß, so that while they might still have to work together, they would not have to live in the same city. Consequently, Ledderhose was elevated to the position of District President, which position he held until 1879, when Edwin Freiherr von Manteuffel was appointed the first Imperial Lieutenant (German: Reichsstatthalter) of Alsace-Lorraine. During his tenure as District President, Ledderhose was able to take part in many great events of state, including several visits by the Kaiser and the imperial court. On the occasion of the Kaiser's visit to inaugurate the opening of the Kaiser-Wilhelm-Universität, Ledderhose received much praise, but his wife Minna was also singled out for her charm and the dignity with which she "played Hausfrau" for the Imperial retinue. Indeed, the Ledderhose's salon, held in the spacious chambers they occupied in the Frauenhaus, now the Musée de l'Œuvre Notre-Dame, were widely praised by Strasbourg's high society for the quality of their attendees, and the conversation therein.

In 1875, Ledderhose was dispatched to Paris to assist a group of Bishops to re-negotiate the borders of the various bishoprics and dioceses in the state of Alsace-Lorraine. The predominantly Catholic French and the predominantly Protestant Germans were ever at odds over dogma, but in this case, property, land, and income were involved, so it became more of a political issue than a religious one. Another interesting event during Ledderhose's tenure as District President occurred in 1877. Two brothers, August and Franz Scherbeck, were Alsatian-born French citizens who had fought in the French army during the Franco-Prussian War, but were now requesting naturalization in Alsace so they could take care of their ailing father and his farm. As enemy combatants, their application process was stymied at various points along the way, including by von Moeller himself, but eventually one of the brothers wrote a letter directly to Bismarck himself, which caused the Chancellor to issue an edict that Ledderhose approve their application. This incident highlights a curious occurrence in the region, whereby the central imperial authorities in Berlin were often more engaged in local administrative matters than the local magistrates themselves.

After his old rival Manteuffel was named Imperial Lieutenant of Alsace-Lorraine in 1879, Ledderhose was replaced by Otto Back, former mayor of Strasbourg as Bezirkspräsident and given the position of Undersecretary of State (German: Unterstaatssekretär) for Agriculture, Industry, and Public Works. According to Alberta von Puttkammer, the daughter of Ledderhose's colleague and former Bezirkspräsident of Lorraine Robert von Puttkamer, the decision to put Ledderhose in this position was based not only on Manteuffel's annoyance with him, but also because "...[he] had neither a lively interest nor a pronounced talent, while he was sympathetic to internal political administrative questions and worked effectively on their solution." In short, Ledderhose was seen as a perfectly serviceable mid-level functionary, who would neither cause trouble nor rock the boat.

Bebauungsplan for the City of Strasbourg (1880)

Shortly after being reassigned to the role of Unterstaatssekretär, in 1880, Ledderhose was involved in the overhaul of Strasbourg's urban center. Most of the planning was done while he was Bezirkspräsident, but even after he lost that position, the project fell under his purview as a matter of public works, so he remained closely involved. Among those who worked with Ledderhose to redesign the city was the famed French architect Jean Geoffroy Conrath. There are records of Ledderhose's impassioned speeches to the government, in which he defended a wide variety of issues that fell under his purview. In one, the government proposed to do away with certain subsidies from forestry income that went to support vocational carpentry schools in the region, which Ledderhose believed to be a grave mistake, and he so impressed his colleagues with statistics and data about the breadth of benefit these schools provided for the poor of their region that the motion was tabled. In another, Ledderhose took up the defense of allowing children to work in the local mines, arguing that "they are given relatively light duties" and are "not compelled to work on Sundays." His speeches before the government also tied into his role as curator of the university, such as one he gave imploring his peers to approve the funding of new greenhouses on campus, to expand the research capabilities of both the departments of botany and medicine. Due to Ledderhose's support, Heinrich Anton de Bary was able to preside over the opening of what was then one of the premier botanical institutes in Europe.

=== As Curator ===
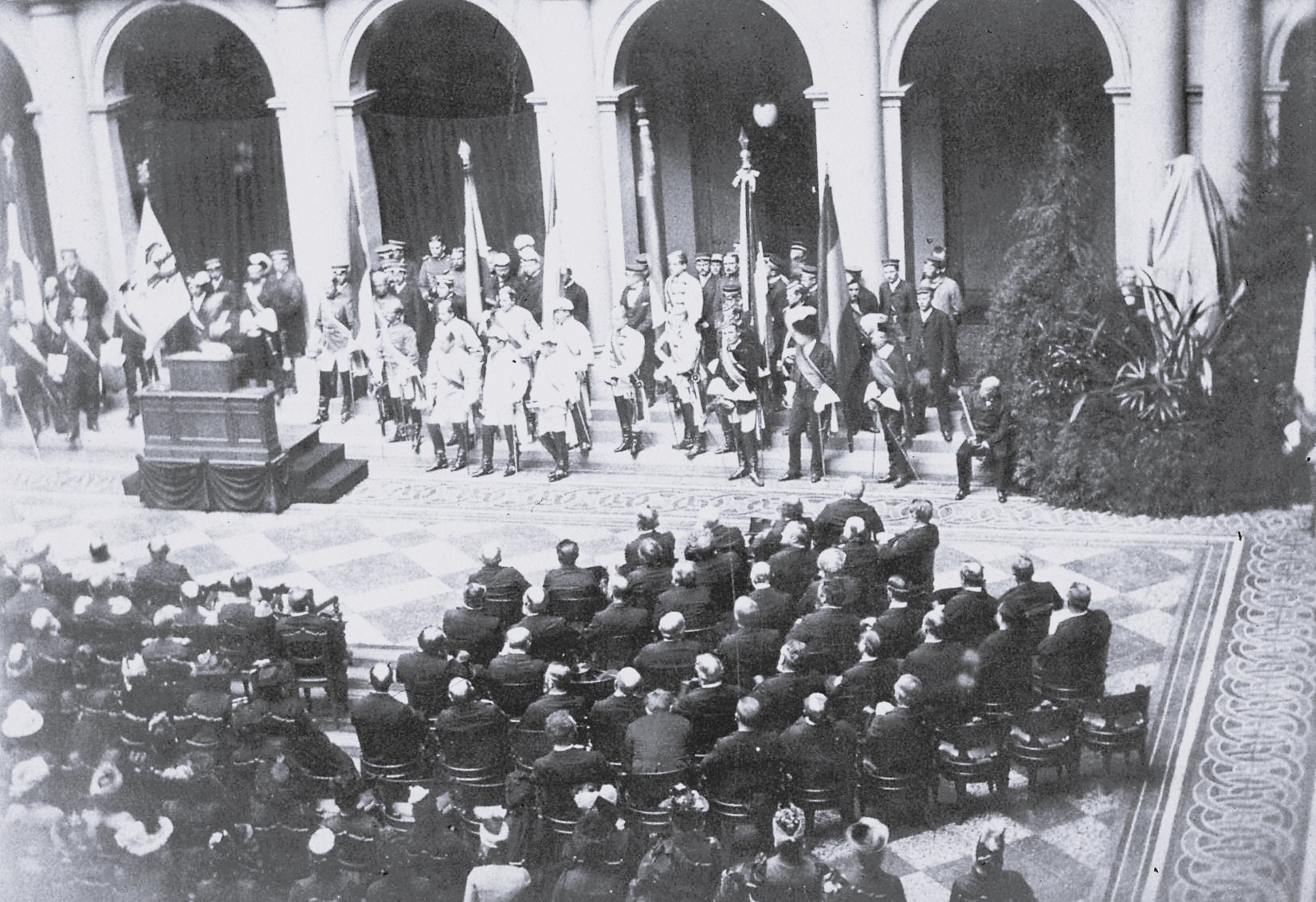
Kaiser Wilhelm addressing the faculty of Strasbourg university in the aula of the Palais Universitaire.

At the same time, Ledderhose was also made curator of the newly established Kaiser-Wilhelm-Universität, whose construction and development he oversaw; at this phase the university occupied the now-vacant Palais Rohan. He was replacing Franz von Roggenbach in this role, and the latter's resentment would make Ledderhose's first several years in the post somewhat difficult. Due to Roggenbach's abrupt resignation, certain crucial aspects of the university's organization were left undone, including the acquisition of faculty, the laying out of permanent statutes, and construction of new buildings for teaching and research. Despite these obstacles, from 1872 to 1875, Ledderhose successfully argued for more than 6 million marks worth of subsidies toward the university from the Alsatian government, accounting for about 3% of the annual regional budget, compared to the .7% of the total Prussian budget was spent on all nine universities in the Kingdom. He also realized that support from the Alsatian government would be insufficient to build and staff the new university to the standard expected by the Kaiser, so he argued and won an additional 5.9 million marks from the Prussian government. Ledderhose's success in securing early funding for the university helped assuage local concern about the rise of German Culture over French, which was and would remain a complex issue in the border region. In addition to developing and fighting for the budget that the school needed to grow and survive, Ledderhose brought prominent architects like Otto Warth and Hermann Eggert to Strasbourg to design the growing universities' teaching and research spaces. As curator, Ledderhose was also able to exact some real on-the-ground change in the way the university's culture was structured. Among his first acts as curator was to abolish both student prisons and faculty policing, both surprisingly common in German-speaking universities at the time, and the removal of which was credited with increasing morale and camaraderie between faculty and students alike. Among Ledderhose's achievement ins the early years of the university was his strong conviction that all faculties should remain united, rather than splitting the liberal arts and natural sciences into two separate schools, an idea which was supported by Generalfeldmarschall Edwin Freiherr von Manteuffel himself.

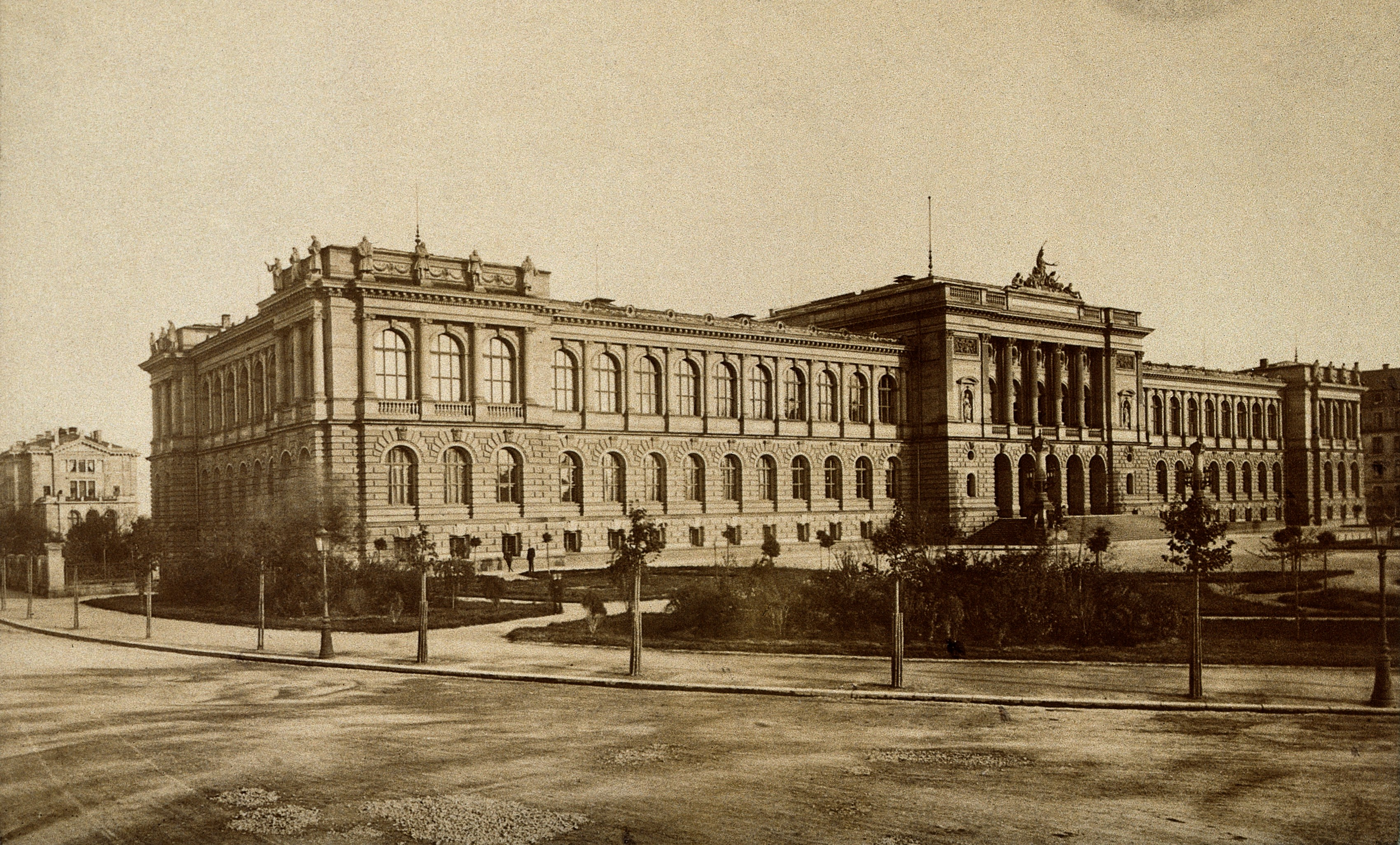
The Palais Universitaire of Kaiser-Wilhelm-Universität, inaugurated in 1884.

Ledderhose's tenure as curator was not without drama, however. In dealing with the pushback from Roggenbach loyalists at the early days, Ledderhose came into direct conflict with Friedrich Althoff, who, while a competent educator, possessed fewer skills than were desired as an administrator, which often left him at odds with both his faculty and his colleagues. Ledderhose, it was noted, had a much softer touch when it came to dealing with the faculty, who quickly grew to appreciate his style, and with whom he would enjoy a very close and productive relationship for the years of his curatorship. In particular, one change that Ledderhose instituted which forever ingratiated him with his faculty, was that he would not appoint anyone to the university faculty without first having the applicant vetted and approved by that body, to avoid any conflict of interest or personality on campus. In one hiring coup, Ledderhose was able to establish two separate chairs for English and Romance studies, two disciplines which had previously only ever been bundled together as "non-German." Effectively, Ledderhose hired both Bernhard ten Brink (in English) and Carl Eduard Böhmer (in Romance, and who had been recommended personally by Wilhelm Dilthey), and made it the government's decision as to which to fire, which they declined to do. Among his attempts to increase the visibility of the university's faculty, Ledderhose courted the renowned astronomer Hugo von Seeliger to come to Strasbourg and direct the newly constructed, state-of-the-art observatory, but von Seeliger declined the offer for unknown reasons. Less successfully, Ledderhose and Bismarck both championed the hiring of Heinrich Julius Holtzmann to the faculty of theology despite having no published work and little teaching experience. This political appointment can be seen through a historical lens as an example of the Kulturkampf waged by the Protestant Prussian establishment against their Catholic subjects.

=== Final days ===
In November 1885, the position of Imperial Lieutenant of Alsace–Lorraine, which had been vacated by Manteuffel in June of that year, was filled by Chlodwig, Prince of Hohenlohe-Schillingsfürst, a high-ranking German nobleman, former Minister-President of Bavaria, and future Chancellor of the German Empire. At first, the relationship between Hohenlohe and the extant cabinet was fine, but over time, personalities began to clash, which led Hohenlohe to correspond directly with the Kaiser and his privy council about replacing his subordinates. Hohenlohe's enemies in Berlin were determined to depict him as weak and ineffectual, so he was forced act decisively in his role as Imperial Lieutenant, and Ledderhose and von Mayr were the victims of that show of strength. In particular, Ledderhose and von Puttkammer's suggestion that a leading Alsatian industrialist, Jean von Schlumberger, be made Bezirkspräsident in Colmar irritated Hohenlohe, and after corresponding with the Kaiser and his aides about the issue, he made the decision to fire both men. The cover of the 1887 parliamentary election was used to disguise the dismissals, and Ledderhose was replaced by the longtime mayor of Strasbourg, Otto Back, while von Mayr was replaced by the Regierungspräsident of Königsberg, Conrad von Studt.

With his removal from his government post, Ledderhose was also replaced as curator of the university. Among his last acts as curator of the university was to oversee the disposition of the estate of August Eduard Cunitz, an esteemed theologian and longtime member of the University faculty. Upon his death in 1886, Cunitz left his entire library and a fortune of ℳ︁180,000, equivalent to millions of dollars in today's currency, the University. As the end of Ledderhose's tenure approached, theology professor Franz Xaver Kraus noted with no small concern that the loss of such a popular leader among both faculty and students was the cause for much unrest, and caused him to fear for the future of the university. Despite these concerns, the university continued to prosper, and Ledderhose faded into obscurity. Nothing is known of his life between his dismissal in 1887 and his death. He died in Strasbourg on 2 January 1899, having outlived his wife and his youngest son.

== Awards ==
- Knight of the Order of the Red Eagle, 2nd Class with Oak Leaves, 18 January 1875 (Prussia)
- Knight of the Royal Order of the Crown, 3rd Class, 1 October 1864; 2nd Class, 1877; with Star, 17 September 1884 (Prussia)
- Commander of the Order of the Zähringer Lion, First Class, 28 March 1879 (Baden)
