= Gustav Adolf von Deines =

Prussian military officer

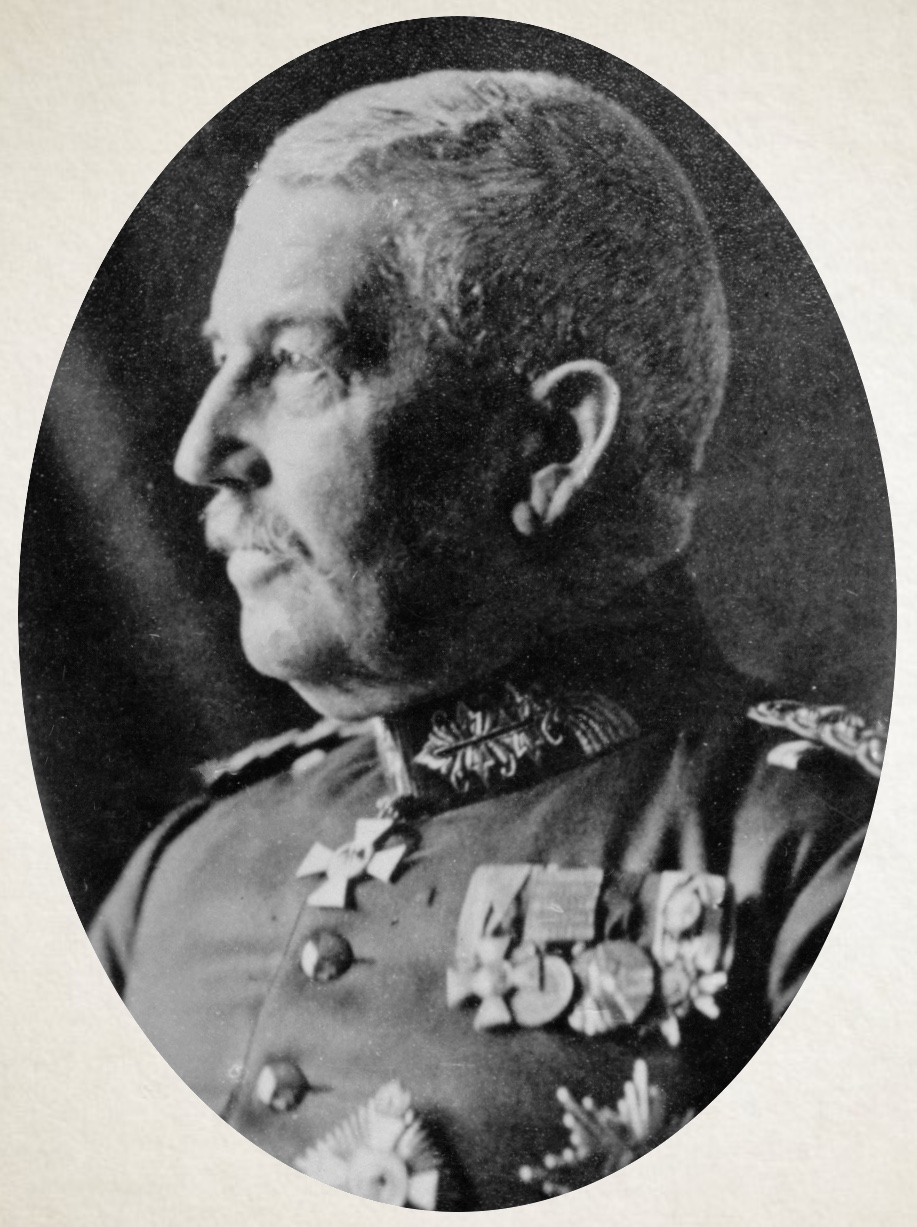
- Born: Gustav Adolf Deines; March 10, 1852; Hanau, Electorate of Hesse, North German Confederation
- Died: May 30, 1914 (aged 62); Halensee, Berlin, Province of Brandenburg, Kingdom of Prussia, German Empire
- Education: Prussian War College
- Spouse: Ida Clara Poppe (m. 1888)
- Children: 4
- Relatives: Adolf von Deines (second cousin), Lutz Heck (son-in-law)
- Military career
- Allegiance: Kingdom of Prussia; German Empire
- Branch: Prussian Army; Imperial German Army
- Service Years: 1870 - 1910
- Rank: General of the Artillery
- Commands: 8th (1st Rhenish) Field Artillery "von Holtzendorff", 2nd Foot Artillery Brigade (1870-1872); Guards Foot Artillery (1894-1896); 9th Schleswig Holstein Foot Artillery Brigade (1897-1899); Department of Foreign Fortresses, West (1901-1903)
- Conflict: Franco-Prussian War; Battle of Gravelotte; Siege of Metz; Battle of Beaumont; Battle of Hallue; Siege of Paris
- Awards: See below

Gustav Adolf von Deines (10 March 1852 – 30 May 1914), born Gustav Adolf Deines, was a Prussian military officer, a General of the Artillery, a member of the German General Staff and Oberquartermeister of the Prussian army.

== Life ==
=== Early life ===
Gustav Adolf Deines was born in Hanau, to a junior branch of a long-established landowning family. His father, Konrad Otto Deines (1824–1886), a landowner, horticulturalist, landscape gardener and business leader who ran a successful plant nursery in Hanau. His mother was Friederike Karoline (née Textor; 1827–1885). Deines' early education took place at the Hohe Landesschule in Hanau, but he did not attend university, and was conscripted directly into military service upon graduating.

=== Military career ===
On 29 March 1870, Deines was assigned to the 8th (1st Rhenish) Field Artillery (von Holtzendorff) Regiment as part of the XXI Army Corps in Saarlouis, with which he would serve for the entirety of the Franco-Prussian War. Deines saw action at the battles of Gravelotte, Beaumont, and Hallue, as well as the sieges of Metz and Paris. on 9 March 1872, Deines was promoted to Second Lieutenant, and after three years of study at the Prussian War College, he was promoted again to Premier-Lieutenant on 14 September 1880. In the spring of the following year, Deines was appointed to the German General Staff, where he served until 1883, when he was made Adjutant of the 2nd Foot Artillery Brigade. In this position, he was able to draw upon the experience he gained during the siege of Paris, and published Die Thätigkeit der Belagerungs-Artillerie vor Paris im Kriege 1870/71 (The Activity of the Siege Artillery Before Paris in the War of 1870/71) to great acclaim, for the first time bringing much deserved recognition to the artillerymen who made the siege successful and helped the German forces win the war. In October 1885, Deines was promoted to Hauptmann and transferred back to the General Staff, of which he would be a member, with few interruptions, for the remainder of his career. On 20 October 1890, Deines was further promoted to Major, and from 1894 was given command of the 1st Battalion of the Guards Foot Artillery. In 1897, Deines was promoted to Oberstleutnant and given the command of the 9th Schleswig-Holstein Foot Artillery (delegated with the leadership since 18 August 1896), and was made Chief of Staff of the Inspectorate-General of Heavy Artillery in May 1897. He retained this position until 22 March 1899, then he was promoted to Oberst, and in 1901 he rejoined the General Staff as Chief of the Heavy Artillery Division. On 17 February 1903, he was promoted to Generalmajor, and at the King's Birthday celebrations in 1906, he was promoted to the General Staff rank of Oberquartermeister, and on 16 October the same year, was again promoted to Generalleutnant. Kaiser Wilhelm II raised Deines to the untitled hereditary nobility on 18 October 1910, after which he became known as Gustav Adolf von Deines. One month later, on 22 November, the newly ennobled Deines retired from the military with the rank of General der Artillerie.

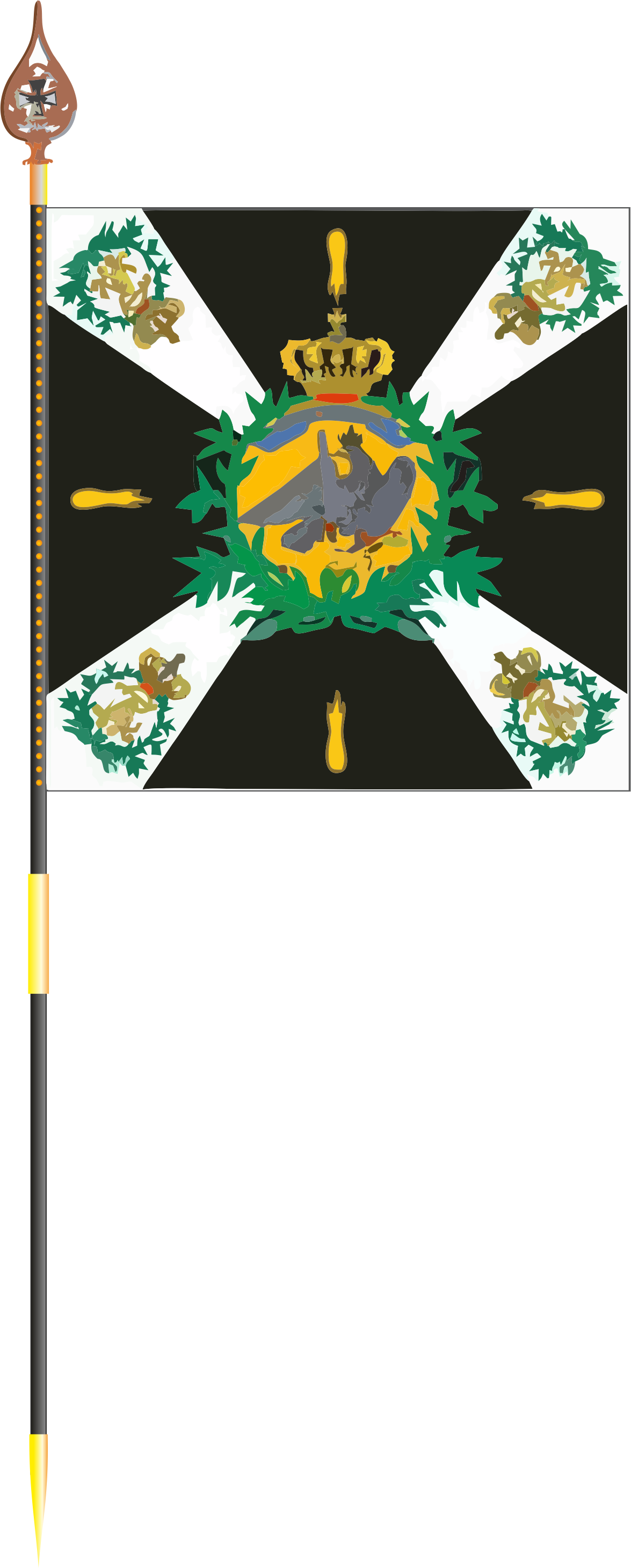
Regimental insignia of the 9th Schleswig-Holstein Foot Artillery

=== Family ===
Gustav Adolf von Deines was the second cousin of the Prussian Cavalry General Adolf von Deines, with whom he shared not only a similarity in name, but also in career. Both men were heavily involved in the German General Staff during the 1880s and 1890s. In addition, they were both intimates of Graf Alfred von Schlieffen. One distinct difference was their right to the surname von Deines. The elder von Deines inherited his nobiliary particle from his grandfather, who was ennobled in 1847, while the younger was ennobled in his own right by the Kaiser in 1910.

On 29 September 1888 in Berlin, Captain Deines married Klara Ida Poppe (1862–1939), and they had four children, two sons and two daughters:

- Ortwin Adolf (24 June 1889 - 14 March 1935), Rittmeister, later chemist
- Eckart Otto Oskar (1892 - 1967), Hauptmann
- Karoline Antonie Helga (1896 - 1938)
- Helga Elisabeth Johanna (16 July 1898 - 17 May 1958) married Lutz Heck, director of the Berlin Zoological Garden.

== Awards and decorations (excerpt) ==
German orders:

- Knight of the Order of the Red Eagle, Second Class with Oak Leaves and Star, January 1909 (Prussia)
- Knight of the Royal Order of the Crown, Second Class, First Class, 1910 (Prussia)
- Knight Commander of the Military Merit Order, Second Class with Star, 1909, First Class, 11 February 1911 (Bavaria)
- Commander of the Albert Order, Second Class, 1900 (Saxony)
- Commander (WK2a) of the Order of the Württemberg Crown, with Star (Württemberg)

Foreign orders:

- Order of the Sacred Treasure, Fourth Class (Japan)
- Grand Officer of the Order of the Crown of Italy (Italy)
- Knight of the Order of the Iron Crown, Second Class (Austria-Hungary)
- Grand Officer (RumSt2) of Order of the Star of Romania (Romania)

== Works published ==
Deines, Gustav Adolf (1884). Die Thätigkeit der Belagerungs-Artillerie vor Paris im Kriege 1870/1871. Kriegsgeschichtliche Einzelschriften. Vol. 4. Berlin: Ernst Sigfried Mittler und Sohn.

Deines, Gustav Adolf (1883). Fleischer, Richard (ed.). "Die Sage von der Überlegenheit der franzözischen Artillerie". Deutsche Revue: Eine Monatschrift. 38 (1). Stuttgart: Deutsch Verlags-Anstalt: 106–113.
