= N-sulfoglucosamine-3-sulfatase =

Identifiers
- EC no.: 3.1.6.15

Databases
- IntEnz: IntEnz view
- BRENDA: BRENDA entry
- ExPASy: NiceZyme view
- KEGG: KEGG entry
- MetaCyc: metabolic pathway
- PRIAM: profile
- PDB structures: RCSB PDB PDBe PDBsum
Search
- PMC: articles
- PubMed: articles
- NCBI: proteins

The enzyme N-sulfoglucosamine-3-sulfatase (EC 3.1.6.15}) catalyzes cleaving off the 3-sulfate groups of the N-sulfo-D-glucosamine 3-O-sulfate units of heparin.

This enzyme belongs to the family of hydrolases, specifically those acting on sulfuric ester bonds. The systematic name is N-sulfo-3-sulfoglucosamine 3-sulfohydrolase. This enzyme is also called chondroitinsulfatase. This enzyme participates in the degradation of glycan structures.
