= Chitobiose =

Disaccharide with β-1,4-linked glucosamine units

(GlcN)_{2}

Chitobioses are a group of related disaccharides of β-1,4-linked glucosamine units. The term chitobiose is sometimes used to refer to different members of the group, depending on the method by which it was first isolated, resulting in some ambiguity as to which chemical compound the name is referring to. It generally refers to:

- Either disaccharide made of unmodified glucosamine units ((GlcN)_{2}), which can be obtained by the breakdown of chitosan;
- Or a disaccharide made of N-acetylglucosamine units ((GlcNAc)_{2}), which can be obtained by the breakdown of chitin. Unambiguously known as N,N'-diacetylchitobiose.

== N,N'-diacetylchitobiose ==
(GlcNAc)_{2}, N,N'-diacetylchitobiose

N,N'-diacetylchitobiose or (GlcNAc)_{2} is a acetylated disacchride produced by the digestion of chitin, either enzymatically or chemically. The systematic name is 4-O-(2-amino-2-deoxy-β-D-glucopyranosyl)-2-amino-2-deoxy-D-glucose.

(GlcNAc)_{2} is utilized by Borrelia burgdorferi to produce N-acetylglucosamine, a component of the bacterial cell wall, and is regularized by the response regulator rrp1. A mutant strain of rrp1 has been found to cause growth deficits with Borrelia burgdorferi.

In Escherichia coli, the chb operon is involved with the utilization of two β-glucosides, cellobiose and (GlcNAc)_{2}. The chbG gene of the chb Operon encodes a chitin disaccharide deacetylase, which converts (GlcNAc)_{2} to (GlcN)_{2}. The chb operon is also responsible for coding the ChbR regulator, which is responsible for activating transcription when (GlcNAc)_{2} is available. N,N'-diacetylchitobiose phosphorylase helps with uptake of this sugar.

== Derivatives ==
Chitobiosyldiphosphodolichol consists of N,N'-diacetylchitobiose attached to dolichyl diphosphate. It is used by the human enzyme ALG1 (chitobiosyldiphosphodolichol beta-mannosyltransferase) in the glycosylation of proteins.

== See also ==
- Glucosamine
- Lysozyme
