= Ledderhose =

Ledderhose may refer to:

- Georg Ledderhose (1855–1925), a German surgeon
- Plantar fibromatosis, also known as Ledderhose's disease

== See also ==
- Lederhosen
