= Glucosaminephosphate isomerase =

Glucosaminephosphate isomerase may refer to:

- Glutamine—fructose-6-phosphate transaminase (isomerizing), an enzyme
- Glucosamine-6-phosphate deaminase, an enzyme
