= CHBP =

CHBP may refer to:

- Capitol Hill Block Party
- N,N'-diacetylchitobiose phosphorylase, an enzyme
