= ALG1-CDG =

- Other names: CDG-IK
- Specialty: Medical genetics
- Usual onset: birth
- Causes: biallelic pathogenic variants in ALG1
- Treatment: none

ALG1-CDG is an autosomal recessive congenital disorder of glycosylation caused by biallelic pathogenic variants in ALG1. The first cases of ALG1-CDG were described in 2004, and the causative gene was identified at the same time. This disorder was originally designated CDG-IK, under earlier nomenclature for congenital disorders of glycosylation. Clinically, individuals with ALG1-CDG have developmental delay, hypotonia, seizures and microcephaly. Fewer than 60 cases of ALG1-CDG have been confirmed in published literature. ALG1-CDG can be suspected based on clinical findings, and abnormal serum transferrin glycosylation test results. Confirmation of the diagnosis can be performed based on sequence analysis of ALG1. The analysis of ALG1 is complicated by the presence of a pseudogene. There are no specific treatments for ALG1-CDG, and most care consists of managing symptoms.
