= Johann Wilhelm Baum =

German Protestant theologian

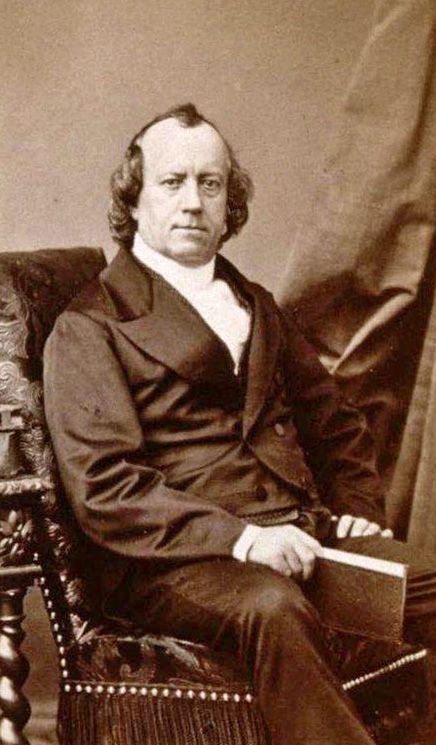
Johann Wilhelm Baum

Johann Wilhelm Baum, sometimes known as Jean Guillaume Baum (7 December 1809, in Flonheim – 28 November 1878, in Strasbourg) was a German Protestant theologian, known for his studies involving the Protestant Reformation.

From 1828 to 1833 he studied philology and theology at the Protestant seminary and at the theological faculty in Strasbourg. From 1847 onward, he served as a pastor at St. Thomas Church in Strasbourg. In 1860 he became a professor of ancient languages and literature at the Protestant seminary, where in 1864 he was named a professor of homiletics. In 1872 he was appointed professor of practical theology at the university.

== Selected works ==
With August Eduard Cunitz and Édouard Guillaume Eugène Reuss, he was co-editor of a multi-volume work on the writings of John Calvin, Ioannis Calvini Opera quae supersunt omnia (59 volumes, 1863–1900). His other published works include:

- Franz Lambert von Avignon : nach seinen Schriften und den gleichzeitigen Quellen (1840) – Biography of Francis Lambert of Avignon.
- Theodor Beza nach handschriftlichen quellen dargestellt (1843) – Biography of Theodor Beza, from handwritten sources.
- Capito und Butzer, Strassburgs Reformatoren (1860) – Wolfgang Capito and Martin Bucer, Strasbourg reformers.
- Le sommaire de Guillaume Farel; réimprimé d'après l'édition de l'an 1534 (1867) – Summary of Guillaume Farel: reprinted from a 1534 edition.
- Histoire ecclésiastique des églises réformées au royaume de France (with August Eduard Cunitz; 3 volumes, 1883–89) – Ecclesiastical history of Reformed churches in the Kingdom of France.
