= Adolf von Deines =

Prussian General of the Cavalry (1845–1911)

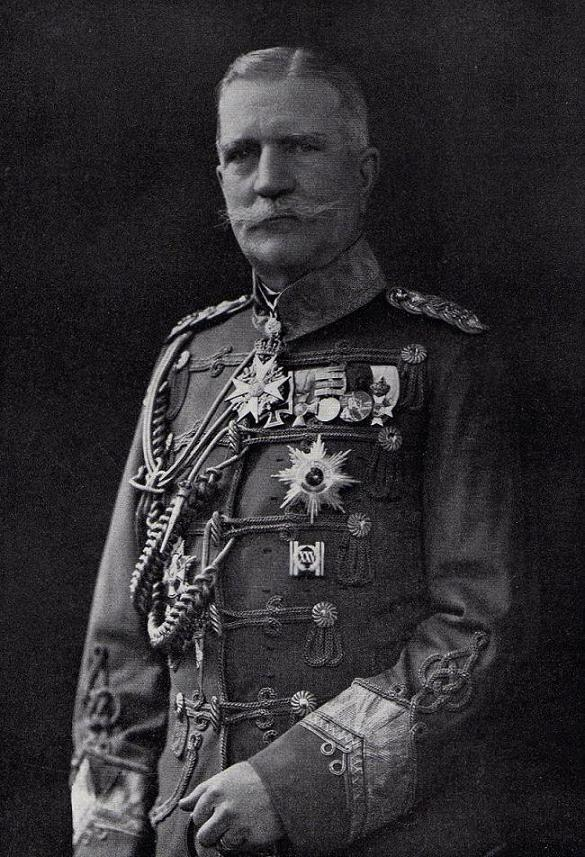
- General von Deines in dress uniform as commander of the VIII Army Corps (1906)
- Born: Johann Georg Adolf Deines; May 30, 1845; Hanau, Electorate of Hesse, German Confederation
- Died: November 17, 1911 (aged 66) Frankfurt am Main, Hesse-Nassau, Kingdom of Prussia
- Allegiance: Kingdom of Prussia; German Empire
- Branch: Prussian Army; Imperial German Army
- Service years: 1867–1906
- Rank: General of the Cavalry
- Commands: 21st Division; VIII Army Corps
- Conflict: Franco-Prussian War; Battle of Gravelotte; Siege of Metz; Battle of Amiens; Battle of the Hallue
- Spouse: Katharina Helene Margarete Elsa Freiin von Falkenhausen (m. 1898)

Johann Georg Adolf Ritter von Deines (May 30, 1845 – November 17, 1911) was a Prussian soldier, diplomat, and educator, as well as a member of the Prussian and Austrian nobility. As a soldier in the Prussian Army, Deines rose to the rank of Cavalry General, and served as aide-de-camp to Kaiser Wilhelm II., under whose rule he also served as military attaché to the Prussian diplomatic missions in both Madrid and Vienna. In addition to his military duties, Deines also served as Obergouverneur, or military-governor, to the Kaiser's sons. In this capacity, Deines oversaw the complete reconstruction of the system in which the princes were educated, shifting from a court-based theoretical system of education to a hands-on, physical style of learning that brought the princes into close contact with boys of varying rank in order to give them a well-rounded understanding of the world, removed from the strictures and pretenses of traditional royal education.

== Life ==
=== Early life and family ===
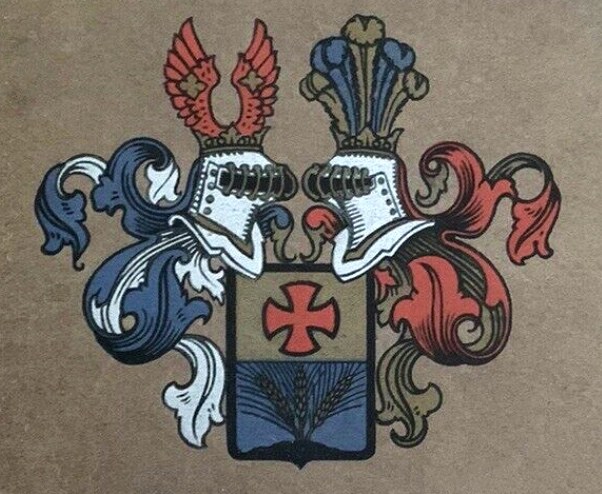
Coat of arms of the noble lineage "Ritter von Deines"

Deines was born on May 30, 1845, in Hanau, then part of Electoral Hesse. He was the second child and only son of Friedrich Wilhelm Ludwig Hermann Deines (1818–1901) and Susette Henriette Emilie (née Pfeiffer; 1816–1866). His father belonged to a Protestant landowning family with roots in Roßdorf bei Hanau dating back to the 16th century, which was ennobled in 1847. In addition to managing his family's estates, Ludwig Deines occasionally stood in for Alexis, Landgrave of Hesse-Philippsthal-Barchfeld in his capacity as deputy in the Kommunallandtag Kassel, or municipal parliament, between 1868 and 1885. Although he turned down a post on the Hanau City Council in 1876, Ludwig served on the Kreistag Hanau, or District Council, until he retired from public duties in 1891. Deines's paternal grandfather was Johann Michael Deines (von Deines after 1847). Through his grandfather, Deines was a descendant of Maria Pachelbel, sister of the organist and composer Johann Pachelbel.

Deines's mother Emilie was also his father's first cousin; her mother was Susanne Deines, sister of Johann Michael. Through his maternal grandfather, Deines was a member of the Pfeiffer family of Kassel and Marburg, which included his great-grandfather Johann Jakob Pfeiffer, his great-uncles Burkhard Wilhelm Pfeiffer, Carl Jonas Pfeiffer, and Franz Georg Pfeiffer, and his cousin Dr. Louis Pfeiffer. Through his mother's sisters, Deines was the nephew by marriage of three prominent men: the chemist Friedrich Wöhler, the legal scholar Otto Bähr, and the Hessian finance minister Karl Ledderhose. The surgeon Georg Ledderhose, who first discovered glucosamine, was his first cousin.

=== Education ===
Deines's early education took place in Hanau, after which he transferred to the gymnasium established by the Bender brothers in Weinheim. He also attended the Institut Garnier in Friedrichsdorf to perfect his French, a necessary part of any 19th-century European education. A stipulation in his father's will required that Deines pursue a career in farming to be eligible to inherit his family estates, so he was sent for a time to the estate of a relative near Gelnhausen for practical education in land management, before a short apprenticeship in Wöltingerode. Eventually, Deines was sent to study agricultural science at the Universities of Göttingen, Halle, and Bonn. Early in Deines' university career, the Austro-Prussian War erupted and fundamentally altered the geographic and political landscape of Hesse and its surroundings. The Prussian victory led to the dissolution of the German Confederation, and the annexation of Hesse into the Kingdom of Prussia as the province of Hesse-Nassau. For Deines, this change was the single instance that made possible his career in the Prussian military, and his ultimate rise to power and influence in the Prussian court. While at Bonn, he became a member of the Corps Palatia. On March 1, 1867, he joined the Husaren-Regiment "König Wilhelm I." (1. Rheinisches) Nr. 7 of the Prussian army as a one-year volunteer, and on July 6, 1869, he was promoted to second lieutenant of the reserves. Deines acquitted himself well as both a soldier and a horseman, but his father refused his request to pursue a military career, so upon graduation from university, he took up a position managing a large noble estate in Schmograu, Lower Silesia.

=== Military career ===
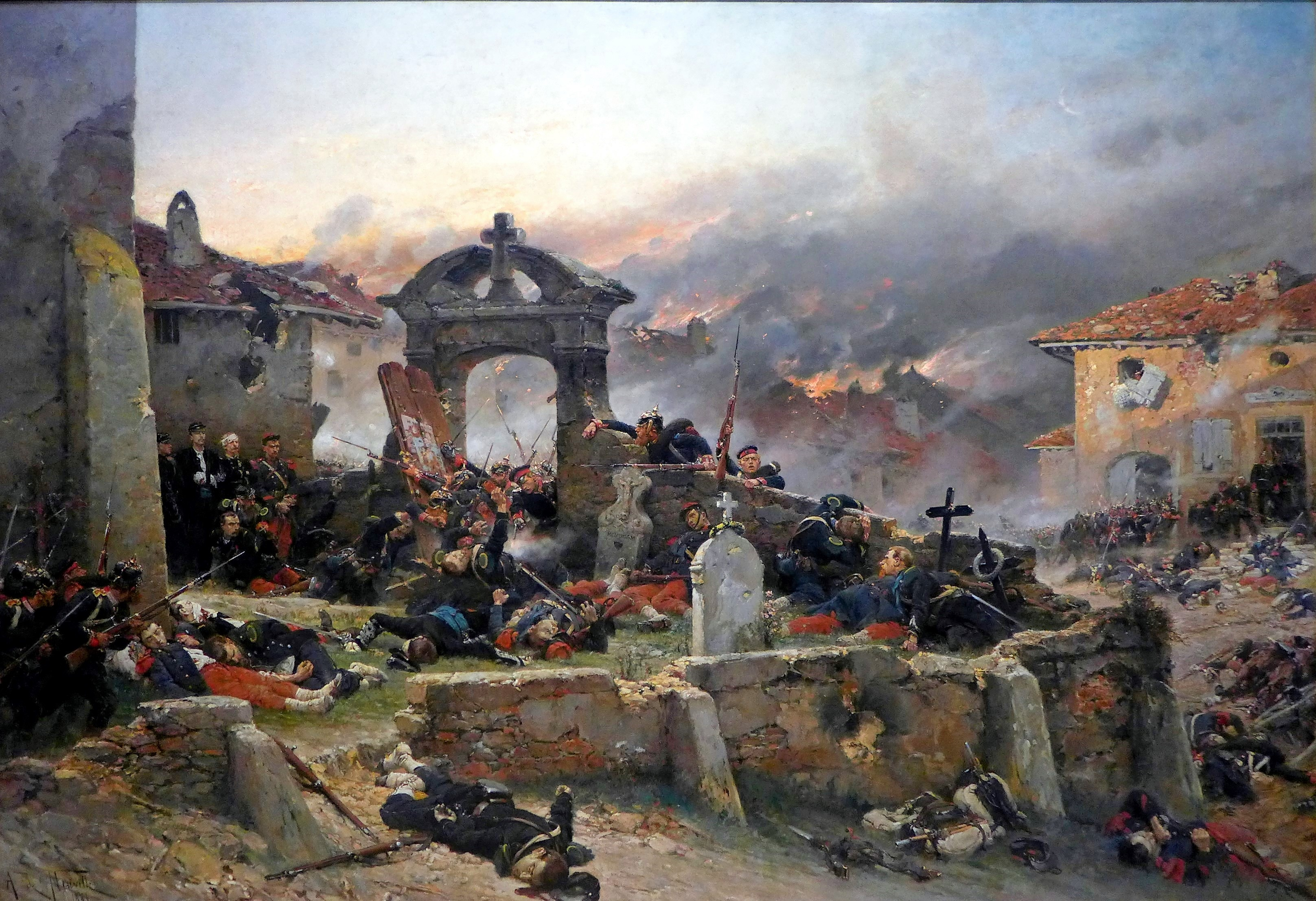
An artist's depiction of the Battle of Gravelotte – The Cemetery of St. Privat by Alphonse-Marie-Adolphe de Neuville (1881)

At the outbreak of the Franco-Prussian War in 1870, Deines was called into active duty with his regiment, with whom he saw combat at the Battle of Gravelotte. Following the siege of Metz, Deines was assigned as an Ordonnanzoffizier to General von Manteuffel of the VIII Army Inspectorate, and later as part of the Prussian South Army. In this capacity, he was present at the Battle of Amiens, and Battle of the Hallue. During his time in the 7th Hussars, Deines made the acquaintance of (then lance-corporal) Bernhard von Bülow, who would remain a lifelong friend. On December 18, 1870, he was awarded the Iron Cross, Second Class. After the end of the conflict, his father wanted him to return and help him manage the family's estates, but Deines sought the intervention of Generalfeldmarschall Freiherr von Loë, whose enthusiastic support helped Deines convince his father to allow him to pursue a career in the military.

Deines remained a commissioned officer of the 7th Hussars (active as of 15 July 1871), rising to the rank of adjutant before being appointed to the Prussian General Staff in March 1872. Here, he worked closely with such military luminaries as Colmar von der Goltz, Friedrich von Bernhardi, Hans von Beseler, Erich von Falkenhayn, Paul von Hindenburg, and, most importantly, Helmuth von Moltke the Elder, whose support Deines would enjoy as he embarked upon this new facet of his career. In 1881, after the signing of the Convention of Constantinople, Deines was sent to the newly established Ottoman/Greek border as a foreign observer. During his sojourn in the Eastern Mediterranean, Deines was able to visit many important historical sites, including the Parthenon and Troy, which was being excavated by Heinrich Schliemann at the time.

=== Political career ===
Politically, Deines was at odds with the group around Privy Councilor Friedrich von Holstein, to whom he attributed an outsized influence on the emperor, as well as chancellor Leo von Caprivi, whose advocacy of free trade and lack of support for large-scale farmers he criticized. From 1885 to 1887, Deines served as the military attaché to the Prussian embassy in Spain, where he was responsible for maintaining cordial military relations between the two kingdoms. His time in Spain was particularly important, as it coincided with the Carolines Question, which pitted Spain and Germany against one another in a colonial struggle over control of the Caroline Islands and Palau in the western Pacific. Deines's background, education, and social acumen served him well in Spain, where he was noted to have won the favor of King Alfonso XII and his Austrian wife Maria Christina, as well as many important Spanish military leaders. In 1887, he was transferred to the Prussian embassy in Vienna, and when Wilhelm II became German Emperor and King of Prussia, Deines was raised to the rank of aide-de-camp. This position gave Deines the curious German right of Immediatstellung, or "immediate access" to the Kaiser, a privilege restricted to the highest ranking nobility and members of the military. As a political agent of Alfred von Waldersee, Deines played an important part in Waldersee's struggle with Otto von Bismarck from 1887 to 1890. Like the military attachés in Saint Petersburg, Paris and Rome, Deines provided the Waldersee with reports that cast a bad light on German foreign policy at the time - and thus on Bismarck as its author. Waldersee later presented these reports to Wilhelm II to rally him against Bismarck and thus bring about his downfall. Reports sent by Deines and his predecessor Karl von Wedel from Vienna regarding the budget and preparedness of the Austrian army were instrumental to Field Marshal Alfred von Schlieffen in his formation of the Schlieffen Plan and plans for German domination of continental Europe. During his tenure in Vienna, Deines also made the acquaintance of the British Brigadier-General Sir Douglas Dawson, who would reminisce fondly of their friendship in his memoirs, despite the estrangement of their nations following two great wars.

==== The Morier Affair ====
Shortly after his tenure in Madrid, Deines became embroiled in a diplomatic scandal involving Prussia, France, and the United Kingdom that became known as the Morier Affair, after its principal actor, British diplomat Robert Morier. On December 16, 1888, the Kölnische Zeitung published a sensational story that accused Morier of diplomatic malfeasance during his time as the chargé d'affaires to the British legation in Darmstadt, which coincided with the Franco-Prussian War. According to the story in the Zeitung, Morier had revealed privileged information regarding Prussian troop movements to Marshal François Bazaine, which at the time greatly endangered Prussian victory. Bazaine died before the story was released, so Deines was the only witness to the claim, which was subsequently determined to be baseless based upon testimony acquired by Morier from Bazaine himself mere months before his death. In the press and among diplomatic circles, the scandal was largely blamed on the antipathy between Morier and Otto von Bismarck. During his tenure in Germany, Morier had become a close friend and confidant to Crown Prince Frederick, with whose liberal leanings he sympathized, against the conservative nationalism of Bismarck. This antipathy between Morier and Bismarck (fueled in large part by the chancellor's son, Herbert) escalated during Morier's subsequent posting as British ambassador in St. Petersburg. His pro-Russian leanings caused great mistrust not only among his former colleagues in Germany, but in Britain as well, given the strong connection between the two nations politically and dynastically. In 1886, German diplomats had circulated rumors that Morier had publicly exclaimed that "[the] Queen was an old fool;" which greatly increased official distrust in him and led to Her Majesty demanding his replacement as ambassador, but due to the lack of suitable replacements, and the lack of evidence to support the accusation, the government did nothing. This previous incident gave credence to the fact that the German press had fabricated the accusations against Morier, leading to the eventual dismissal of any proceedings.

=== The Prinzenschule ===
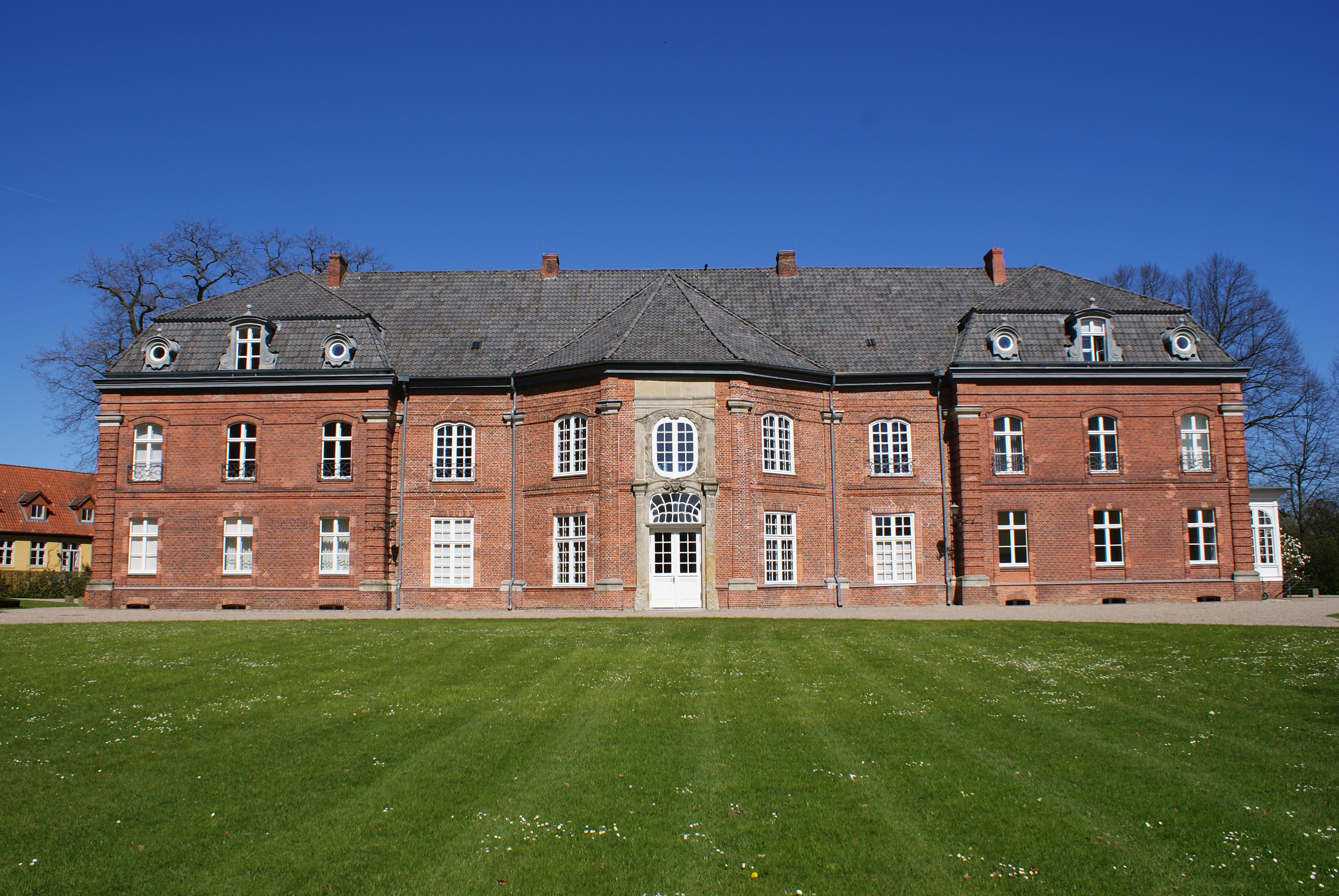
The Prinzenhaus at Plön, where Deines instructed the sons of Kaiser Wilhelm II

In 1890, Deines was promoted to the rank of Oberstleutnant, and in 1892, to Oberst. In October 1894, while retaining his position as aide-de-camp, Deines was recalled from Vienna to Berlin to act as Obergouverneur, or the individual in charge of the education of the emperor's sons. Deines was one of few university-educated commoners in the upper echelons of the military, which distinction made him perfect to instruct the young princes. He was also known to be disdainful of the sycophantic and overweening nature of most courtiers, whom he once described as "larvae." Life at court in Berlin was seen as detrimental to the 'proper formation' of the princes, and it was believed that if they undertook their education away from the influences of court, they would grow to be better princes and better politicians. To achieve this end, a former summer residence at Plön was converted to a boarding school, the Prinzenhaus, or Princes' House. The town of Plön in Schleswig-Holstein was chosen, in part, to soften the blow to the Empress Augusta Victoria, because it was located in her ancestral homeland, and so while the children were apart from her, they were at least in a place she knew and loved. Here, Deines undertook the education of the Emperor's oldest sons, Crown Prince Wilhelm, Prince Eitel Friederich, and Prince Adalbert (with their younger brothers following them in the decade to come). At Plön, the princes were given all of the instruction typical of boys at the time, including history, geography, elocution, religion, mathematics, and the sciences; Deines even had a chemistry laboratory built into the basement of the Prinzenhaus.

In addition to their education, the students, which included not only the princes, but also students from the nearby cadet training academy hand-chosen by Deines himself, were expected to excel at horsemanship, gymnastics, swimming, rowing, and overall physical fitness. The grounds were also furnished with a working farm so that the students could gain some small insight into the lives of their still largely rural subjects. Ernst von Dryander, the instructor in religion at the school, described their training thusly: "A Prussian prince should and must learn more than others. Not only that ours had to pass a regular final exam in a Realschule of the first order; they had to speak English and French fluently, control their horse like a cavalry soldier, and ride through the countryside map in hand." Deines is generally seen as successful in the acquittal of this duty, particularly in exposing the boys to military cadets of their age from different social backgrounds. This was despite a noted tension between him and the boys' mother, the Kaiserin Augusta Victoria, who Deines once referred to as "...a nervously ill woman and an unreasonably anxious mother who, despite many excellent qualities, hurts at least as much as she helps." In one particular memorandum, von Deines wrote "a crown prince is not a higher form of human being, but simply one placed in a higher position. In order to form a capable, whole man, one will have to take the same road as that for other sons of the educated classes," a sentiment which did little to endear him to the Kaiserin. In gratitude for overseeing the education of his sons, Wilhelm II made Deines a Commander of the Royal House Order of Hohenzollern in 1898, as well as raising him to the rank of adjutant general. At the same time, he was made commander of the 21st Division.

=== Marriage, retirement and death ===
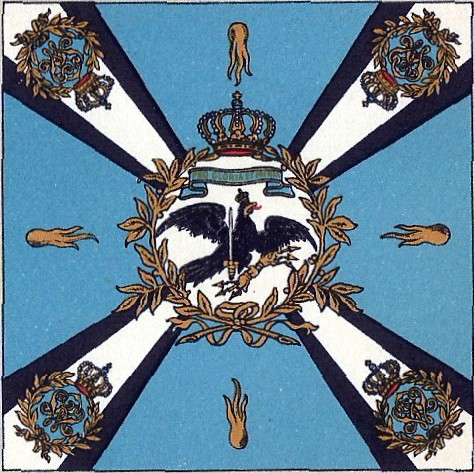
The flag of the VIII Armeekorps of the Prussian Army

On 12 July 1898, Deines was married to Katharina Helene Margarete Elsa Freiin von Falkenhausen (July 27, 1872 – January 8, 1949), the daughter of the esteemed Generaloberst Ludwig Freiherr von Falkenhausen and his wife, Helene Julie Auguste Ferdinande, née von Waldow und Reitzenstein (1847–1886).

Almost thirty years older than his wife, Deines actually served with his father-in-law during the Franco-Prussian War, where they fought together at the Battle of Gravelotte as part of the VIII Army Corps. The couple never had children. On 16 October 1902, he was appointed commanding officer of the VIII Army Corps, and on 29 May 1903, was promoted to the rank of General of the Cavalry, marking the pinnacle of his military career. By 1906, increased hearing loss forced Deines to relinquish his command of the VIII Army Corps, and he was retired from active duty, although he retained the honorary rank of Adjutant general à la suite to his old unit, the 7th Hussar Regiment. On the 27th of January, 1910, Kaiser Wilhelm II appointed Deines a Knight of the Order of the Black Eagle, the Kingdom of Prussia's highest order of chivalry, "in grateful recognition of services rendered". Adolf von Deines died in hospital at Frankfurt am Main on November 17, 1911, from complications following a surgery to relieve an intestinal blockage. On December 10, he was buried at the Hanau Hauptfriedhof with full military honors; Prince Eitel Friedrich was in attendance as a representative of the royal family. Deines' monumental tombstone in the Hanau Hauptfriedhof has been designated a cultural heritage monument by the Hessian Department of Cultural Heritage Management.

== Orders and decorations ==
German Honors:
- Service Award Cross (Prussia)
- Iron Cross, 2nd Class on Black Band, 18 December 1870 (Prussia)
- War Commemorative Medal of 1870-1871, 20 May 1871 (Prussia)
- Kaiser Wilhelm Memorial Medal, 22 March 1897 (Prussia)
- Knight of the Order of the Red Eagle, 4th Class, 18 January 1883; 3rd Class with Bow and Crown, 27 January 1893; 2nd Class with Oak Leaves, 27 January 1897; Grand Cross (Prussia)
- Knight of the Royal Order of the Crown, 3rd Class, 27 January 1891; 2nd Class, 19 September 1893 with Star, 27 January 1899; 1st Class, 19 September 1901 (Prussia)
- Knight's Cross of the Royal House Order of Hohenzollern, 6 September 1891; Commander's Cross, 22 May 1898 (Prussia)
- Knight of the Order of the Black Eagle, 27 January 1910 (Prussia)
- Grand Cross of the Order of the Zähringer Lion, 1900 (Baden)
- Grand Cross of the House Order of the Wendish Crown, with Golden Crown, 1905 (Mecklenburg)
- Commander of the Order of the White Falcon, 1892 (Saxe-Weimar-Eisenach)
- Commander of the Albert Order, 2nd Class, 1891 (Saxony)
- Commander of the Order of the Württemberg Crown, 1893 (Württemberg)

Foreign Honors:

- Knight of the Imperial Order of the Iron Crown, 2nd Class, 1887; 1st Class, 1900 (Austria-Hungary)
- Commander of the Imperial Austrian Order of Franz Joseph, with Star, 1893 (Austria-Hungary)
- Grand Cross of the Austrian Imperial Order of Leopold, 1908 (Austria-Hungary)
- Grand Cordon of the Order of Leopold 11 May 1905 (Kingdom of Belgium)
- Grand Cross of the Order of the Crown of Italy (Kingdom of Italy)
- Knight of the Order of the Redeemer, with Golden Cross (Kingdom of Greece)
- Imperial Order of the Lion and the Sun, 5th Class (Sublime State of Persia)
- Imperial Order of the Double Dragon, Class II Grade I (Empire of the Great Qing)
- Grand Cross of the Royal Order of Isabella the Catholic, 25 June 1900 (Spain)
- Commander of the Royal and Distinguished Order of Charles III, 14 August 1886 (Spain)
- Knight of the Order of Military Merit, 2nd Class, 12 April 1887 (Spain)

== Publications ==
- von Deines, Adolf (1876). Das Königs-Husaren-Regiment (1 Rheinisches) Nr. 7 von der Formation des Stammregiments bis zur Gegenwart. Berlin: E. S. Mittler und Sohn.
- von Deines, Adolf; Freiherr von Türcke, Leopold (1904). Das Husaren-Regiment König Wilhelm I (1 Rheinisches) Nr. 7 von der Formation des Stammregiments bis zur Gegenwart. Berlin: E. S. Mittler und Sohn.

Political offices
Preceded by Curt von Pfuel	German military attaché in Madrid; January 1885–March 1887	Succeeded by Oberst Fincke
Preceded by Karl von Wedel	German military attaché in Vienna; March 1887–1894	Succeeded by Dietrich von Hülsen-Haeseler
