= Édouard Guillaume Eugène Reuss =

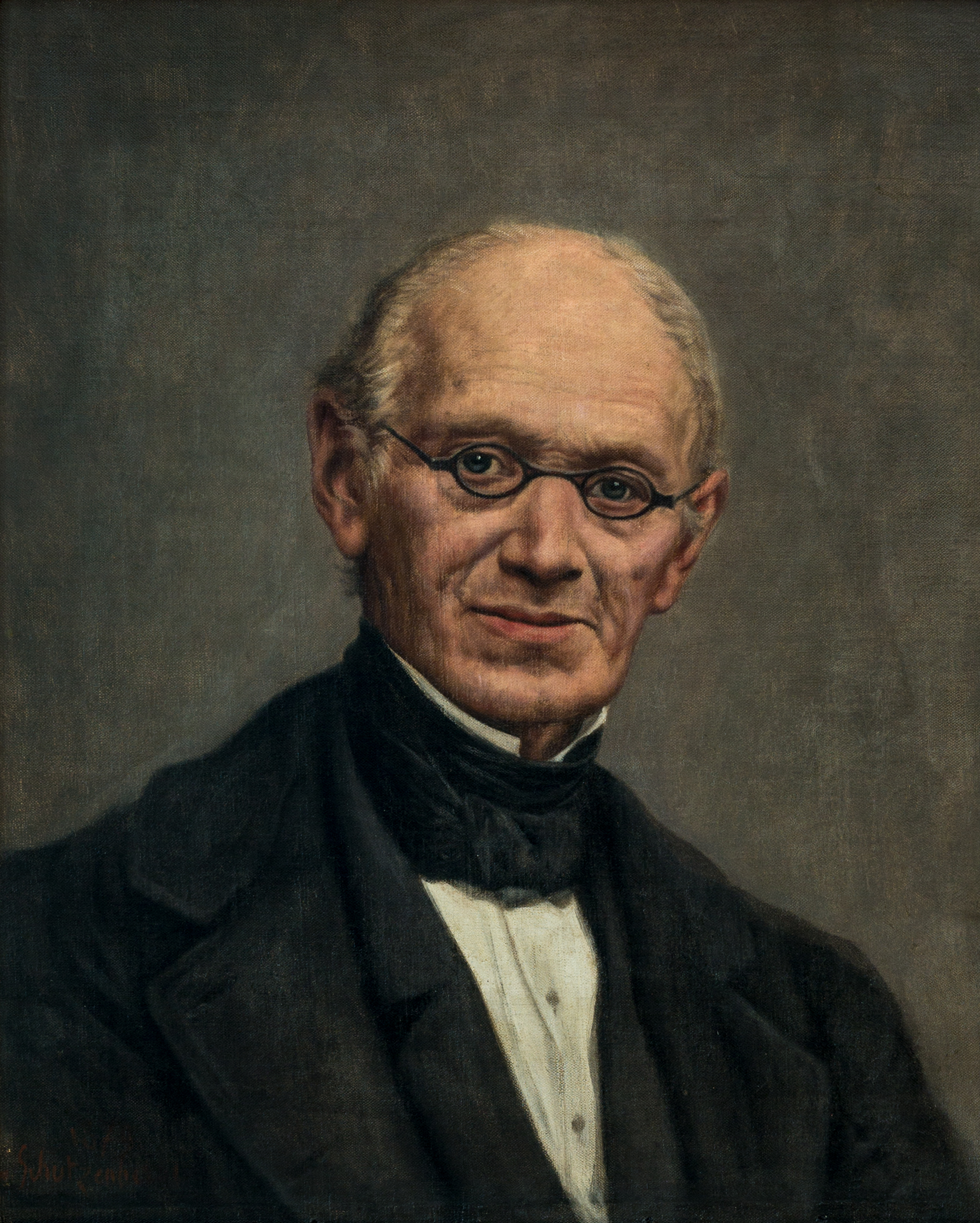
Portrait of Reuss

Edouard Guillaume Eugène Reuss (German: Eduard Wilhelm Eugen Reuss; 18 July 1804 – 15 April 1891) was a Protestant theologian from Alsace.

== Life ==
He was born in Strasbourg, where he studied philology from 1819 to 1822. He went on to study theology at University of Göttingen under Johann Gottfried Eichhorn; and Oriental Languages at Halle under Wilhelm Gesenius, and afterwards at Paris under Silvestre de Sacyfrom 1827 to 1828. In 1828 he became Privatdozent in Strasbourg. From 1829 to 1834 he taught Biblical criticism and Oriental languages at the Strasbourg Theological School; he then became assistant, and afterwards, in 1836, regular professor of theology at that university. He became Professor of Old Testament at the same institution in 1864. Reuss was appointed as a regular member of the Deutsche Morgenländische Gesellschaft in May 1846. The sympathies of Reuss were German rather than French, and after the annexation of Alsace to Germany, he remained at Strasbourg, and retained his professorship till he retired on a pension in 1888. He died in the same city.

Reuss belonged to the liberals in the Lutheran Protestant Church of Augsburg Confession of Alsace and Lorraine. His critical position was to some extent that of K. H. Graf and Julius Wellhausen: he was in a sense their forerunner, and was actually for a time Graf's teacher. The originator of the new movement, he hesitated to publish the results of his studies.

His son, Ernst Rudolf (1841–1924), was in 1873 appointed city librarian at Strasbourg.

== Works ==
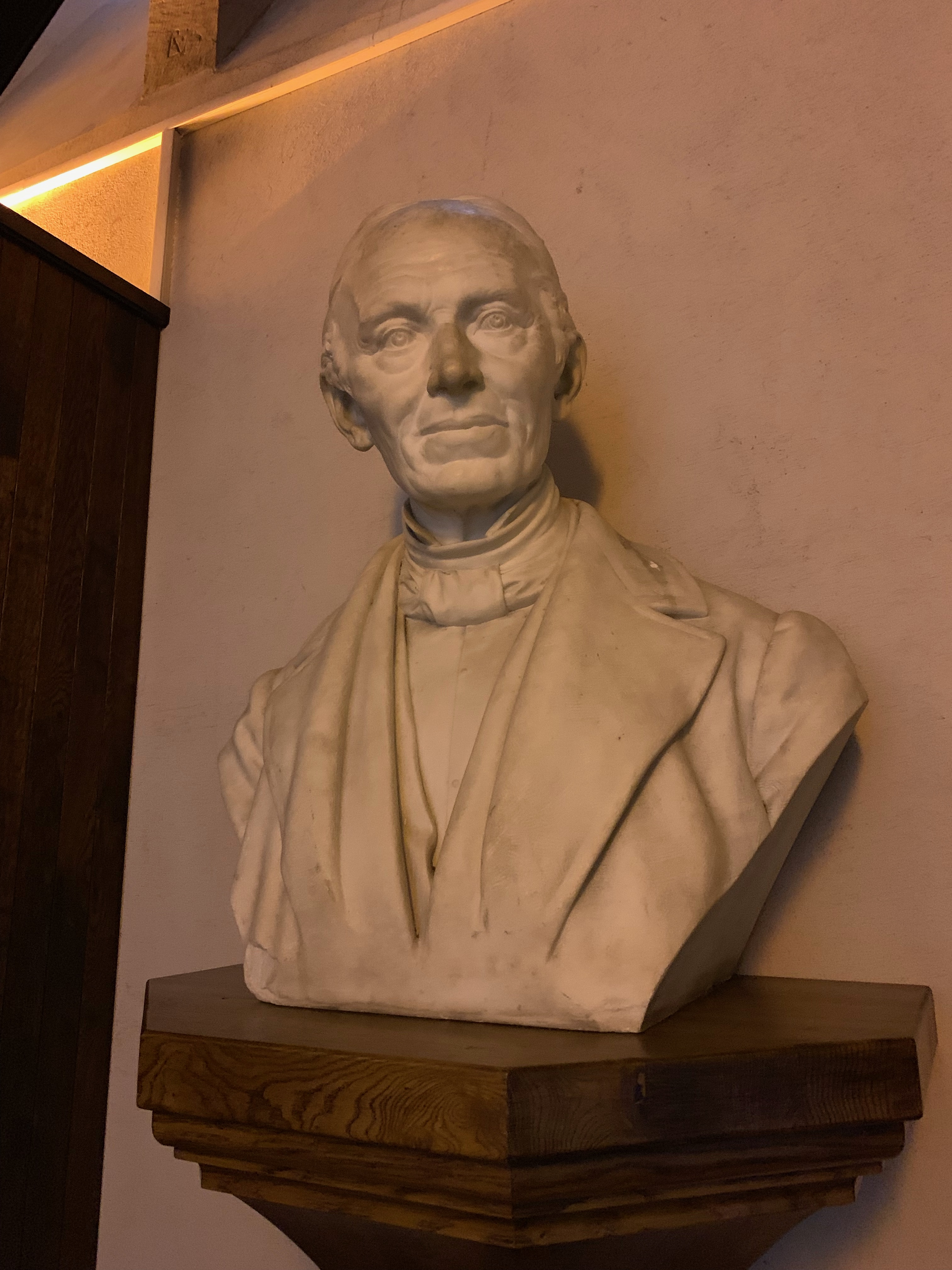
Bust of Édouard Guillaume Reuss

Amongst his earliest works were: De libris veteris Testamenti apocryphis plebi non negandis (1829), Ideen zur Einleitung in das Evangelium Johannis (1840) and Die Johanneische Theologie (1847). In 1852 he published his Histoire de la théologie chrétienne au siècle apostolique, which was followed in 1863 by L'Histoire du canon des saintes écritures dans l'église chrétienne. In 1874 he began to publish his translation of the Bible, La Bible, nouvelle traduction avec commentaire. New Testament criticism and exegesis formed the subject of Reuss's earlier labours—in 1842, he had published in German a history of the books of the New Testament, Geschichte der heiligen Schriften N. Test.; and though his own views were liberal, he opposed those of the Tübingen school. After a time he turned his attention to Old Testament criticism, based on knowledge of Hebrew. In 1881 he published in German his Geschichte der heiligen Schriften A. Test., a history of Israel from its earliest beginning till the taking of Jerusalem by Titus.

For many years Reuss edited with A. H. Cunitz the Beiträge zu den theologischen Wissenschaften. With A. H. Cunitz and J. W. Baum (1809–1878), and after their death alone, he edited the monumental edition of Calvin's works (38 vols., 1863 ff.). His critical edition of the Old Testament appeared a year after his death.
