= Chitin disaccharide deacetylase =

Class of enzymes

Identifiers
- EC no.: 3.5.1.105

Databases
- BRENDA: enzyme data
- ExPASy: NiceZyme view
- KEGG: enzyme entry
- MetaCyc: metabolic pathway
- Rhea: reactions
- PDB structures: RCSB PDB PDBe PDBsum
Search
- PMC: articles
- PubMed: articles
- NCBI: proteins

Chitin disaccharide deacetylase (EC 3.5.1.105, chitobiose amidohydolase, COD, chitin oligosaccharide deacetylase, chitin oligosaccharide amidohydolase) is an enzyme characterised from Vibrio species with systematic name 2-(acetylamino)-4-O-(2-(acetylamino)-2-deoxy-beta-D-glucopyranosyl)-2-deoxy-D-glucopyranose acetylhydrolase. It catalyses the hydrolysis of one of the two acetyl groups in N,N'-diacetylchitobiose to give N-acetylchitobiose and acetic acid.

N,N'-diacetylchitobiose
H_{2}O
CH_{3}CO_{2}H
N-acetylchitobiose

An alternative name for the product is N-acetyl-β-D-glucosaminyl-(1->4)-D-glucosamine. Both it and the substrate are types of chitobiose, sugar components of cell walls with disaccharide structure. Unlike the related chitin deacetylase, this enzyme is specific for disaccarides and trisaccharides.
