= Otto Bähr =

German legal scholar and liberal parliamentarian

- Born: 2 June 1817; Fulda, Electorate of Hesse (German Confederation)
- Died: 17 February 1895 (aged 77); Kassel, Hesse-Nassau, Germany
- Occupations: Author on Jurisprudence; Politician
- Spouses: Sophie Pfeiffer (married 1844-1873); Lilly Rembe (Married 1878-1892)
- Relatives: Friedrich Wöhler, Karl Ledderhose (brothers-in-law), Adolf von Deines, Georg Ledderhose (nephews)

Otto Bähr (2 June 1817 – 17 February 1895) was a German legal scholar and liberal parliamentarian.

He supported the view, not always well accepted by governments, that since the State was part of society, it must be judged in the same courts as individual citizens.

== Life ==
=== Early years ===
Bähr was born in Fulda, then as now a small historic town slightly more than 100 km (65 miles) north-east of Frankfurt in a region of the former Holy Roman Empire, at the time still with a somewhat ambiguous constitutional status, known as the Electorate of Hesse. His father was an army doctor. He devoted his own student studies to Jurisprudence and Cameralism (Kameralwissenschaften) at Göttingen and Marburg.

=== Legal career ===
In 1848 Otto Bähr was a member of a commission established to codify the administration of civil justice in the Electorate of Hesse. In 1844 he had obtained a post as a junior Hugh Court judge (Obergerichts-Assessor), and in 1849 he became a more senior High Court judicial official (Obergerichts-Rath) in the Electorate's capital, Kassel. In terms of the serious political ructions that affected politics and constitutional law in the Electorate of Hesse at the time, Otto Bähr was an opponent of the arbitrary traditionalism represented by Ludwig Hassenpflug, as a result of which he was sent back to his home town, Fulda, in 1851. However, Hassenpflug fell from power during the early 1850s and in 1856 Bähr was permitted to return to Kassel. In 1857 he received an honorary doctorate from the University of Marburg. He nevertheless rejected offers of academic posts from Marburg and from two other universities.

In 1863 or 1864 he was appointed a senior appeal court judge ("Oberappellationsgerichtsrat") based in Kassel. After the events of 1866, whereby the Electorate of Hesse lost its independence, in September 1867 Bähr was accepted as a high court judge in the Prussian justice service, headquartered in Berlin. Later, following unification, in 1879, he was appointed as a high court judge at the new state's High Court, which had its seat in Leipzig, but he resigned the post with nervous exhaustion in 1881.

=== Authorships ===
Bähr wrote a number of influential legal works. He was critical of various contemporary developments in Jurisprudence. Of particular importance is his 1864 publication "Der Rechtsstaat. Eine publicistische Skizze", which provides a basis for modern concepts of the rule of law.

=== Politics ===
In 1867 he became a member of the short-lived North German Reichstag, where he remained till the body was dissolved at the end of 1870. Following unification, he was listed as a member of the German Reichstag between 1871 and 1880. He also sat as a member of the Prussian House of Representatives between 1867 and 1879. In the parliaments he represented a Kassel electoral district, sitting as a member of the National Liberal Party.

== Publications ==
- Die Anerkennung als Verpflichtungsgrund (1855), 2nd edition Göttingen 1867, 3rd edition Leipzig 1894
- Der Rechtsstaat. Eine publicistische Skizze. Cassel & Göttingen, 1864.
- Die preußischen Gesetzentwürfe über die Rechte am Grundvermögen, Jena 1870.
- Das Gesetz über die Enteignung von Grundeigenthum vom 11. Juni 1874, Berlin 1875, 2nd edition 1878.
- Das Rechtsmittel zweiter Instanz im deutschen Civilproceß, Jena 1871.
- Das Tonsystem unserer Musik, Leipzig 1882.
- Urtheile des Reichsgerichts mit Besprechungen, München 1883.
- Eine deutsche Stadt vor 60 Jahren, Leipzig 1884, 2nd edition 1886.
- Die Proceß-Enquête des Prof. Dr. Wach, Kassel 1888.
- Gesammelte Aufsätze, Leipzig 1895.
- In Sachen der Gotthardbahngesellschaft gegen die Unternehmung des großen Tunnels, Gutachten Luzern 1884.
- In der Rechtssache der Baugesellschaft Flüelen-Göschenen in Zürich gegen die Direction der Gotthardbahn in Luzern, Gutachten, Luzern 1887.
- Herausgeber der Jahrbücher für die Dogmatik des heutigen römischen und deutschen Privatrechts, Bd. 12—25.
