= Rodolphe Reuss =

French historian

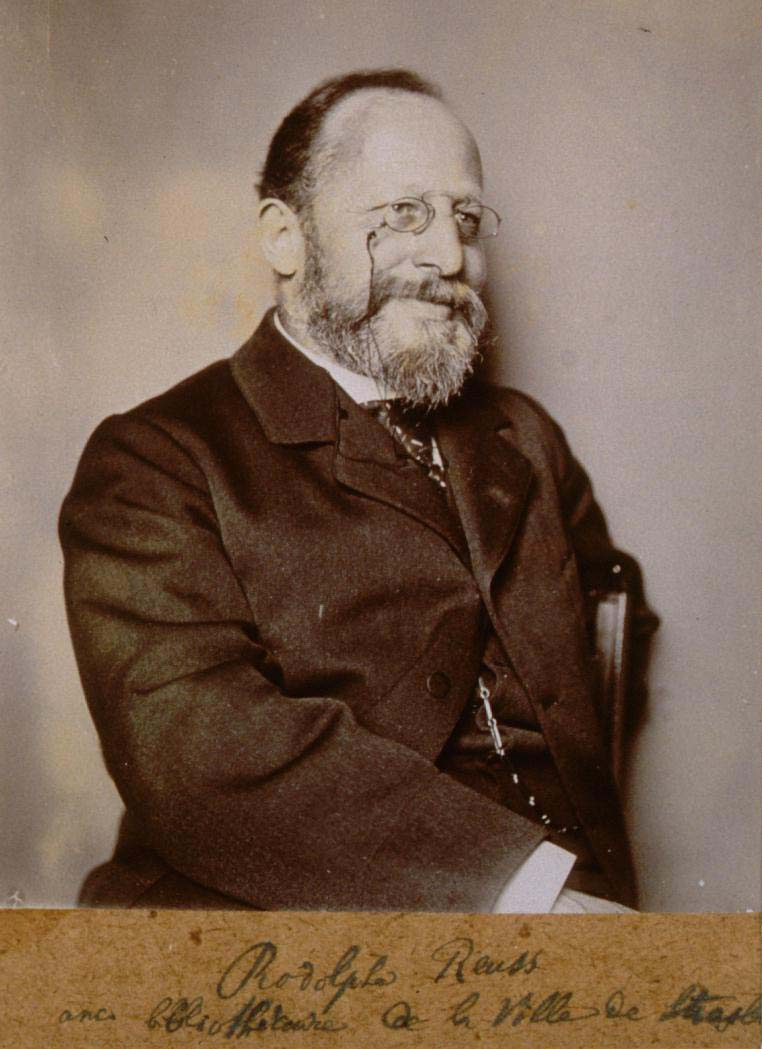
- Photograph c. 1880
- Born: 13 October 1841 Strasbourg, Grand Est, France
- Died: 16 August 1924 (aged 82) Versailles, Yvelines, Île-de-France, France
- Occupation: historian

Rodolphe Ernest Reuss (aka Rudolf Reuss in German; 13 October 1841 in Strasbourg – 16 August 1924 in Versailles) was a French historian from Alsace.

He also published under the pseudonym Anton Schweidnitz.

== Biography ==
Rodolphe Reuss was born to Protestant theologian Edouard Reuss and his wife Julie (née Himly). He was educated at Strasbourg, receiving a bachelor at the Faculty of Arts in 1861. Subsequently, he spent three years at different universities in Germany, at first in Munich, then Jena, Berlin, and finally Göttingen, where he attended the lectures of German historian Georg Waitz and where he finished his PhD thesis on Count Ernst von Mansfeld in Bohemia in October 1864. He earned a Dr.Phil "summa cum laude" in December 1864, and subsequently returned to Strasbourg, where he became a teacher at the Jean Sturm Gymnasium in 1865. Four years later on, he was appointed privatdozent at the Protestant Seminary of Strasbourg. After the Franco-Prussian War he resumed his position as teacher, retired however from the Protestant seminary when the Kaiser-Wilhelms-Universität was founded in 1872 and became librarian at the Strasbourg library. Reuss worked as a teacher and librarian in his hometown until 1896. He then moved to Versailles, close to Paris, where he was appointed professor at the École des hautes études in June 1896. He gave lectures there two times a week for 26 years, while living with his family in Versailles. He died there in 1924.

== Works ==
His historical writings in both French and German deal with Alsace; among them are:

- Beiträge zur Geschichte des dreissigjährigen Krieges im Elsass (“Contributions to the history of the 30 Years War in Alsace,” 1868)
- Vieux noms et rues nouvelles de Strasbourg (“Old names and new streets of Strasbourg,” 1883)
- Alsace au XVIIIème siècle (“Alsace in the 18th century,” 1897 et seq.)
