= ALG1 =

Protein-coding gene in the species Homo sapiens

Identifiers
- Aliases: ALG1, CDG1K, HMAT1, HMT-1, HMT1, MT-1, Mat-1, hMat-1, chitobiosyldiphosphodolichol beta-mannosyltransferase, ALG1 chitobiosyldiphosphodolichol beta-mannosyltransferase
- External IDs: OMIM: 605907; MGI: 2384774; GeneCards: ALG1
Enzyme activity
EC #	BRENDA	ExPASy	KEGG	MetaCyc
2.4.1.142	↗	↗	↗	↗

Gene location (Human)
Chr.	Chromosome 16 (human)
Band	16p13.3	Start	5,033,702 bp
Band	16p13.3	End	5,087,379 bp

Gene location (Mouse)
Chr.	Chromosome 16 (mouse)
Band	16|16 A1	Start	5,051,485 bp
Band	16|16 A1	End	5,062,776 bp
RNA expression pattern
Bgee	Human / Mouse (ortholog); Top expressed in: stromal cell of endometrium; buccal mucosa cell; body of pancreas; left adrenal gland; right adrenal cortex; mucosa of transverse colon; left adrenal cortex; body of stomach; islet of Langerhans; right testis / Top expressed in: right kidney; vestibular membrane of cochlear duct; otic vesicle; proximal tubule; utricle; stroma of bone marrow; saccule; lacrimal gland; neural layer of retina; molar; More reference expression data
BioGPS	n/a
Gene ontology
Molecular function	transferase activity; glycosyltransferase activity; mannosyltransferase activity; chitobiosyldiphosphodolichol beta-mannosyltransferase activity
Cellular component	integral component of membrane; endoplasmic reticulum membrane; endoplasmic reticulum; membrane
Biological process	dolichol-linked oligosaccharide biosynthetic process; mannosylation; protein glycosylation
Sources:Amigo / QuickGO
Orthologs
Databases	NCBI: entry; OMA: entry
Species	Human	Mouse
Entrez	56052	208211
Ensembl	ENSG00000033011	ENSMUSG00000039427
UniProt	Q9BT22	Q921Q3
RefSeq (mRNA)	NM_019109; NM_001330504	NM_145362
RefSeq (protein)	NP_001317433; NP_061982	NP_663337
Location (UCSC)	Chr 16: 5.03 – 5.09 Mb	Chr 16: 5.05 – 5.06 Mb
PubMed search
- Wikidata
View/Edit Human	View/Edit Mouse

Chitobiosyldiphosphodolichol beta-mannosyltransferase is an enzyme that is encoded by ALG1 whose structure and function has been conserved from lower to higher organisms.

== Function ==
The biosynthesis of lipid-linked oligosaccharides is highly conserved among eukaryotes and is catalyzed by 14 glycosyltransferases in an ordered stepwise manner. The Alg1 mannosyltransferase I (MT I) catalyzes the first mannosylation step in this process. Clinically, the deficiency of ALG1 in humans results in ALG1-CDG, a congenital disorder of glycosylation.
