= Glucosamine-6-phosphate deaminase =

Class of enzymes

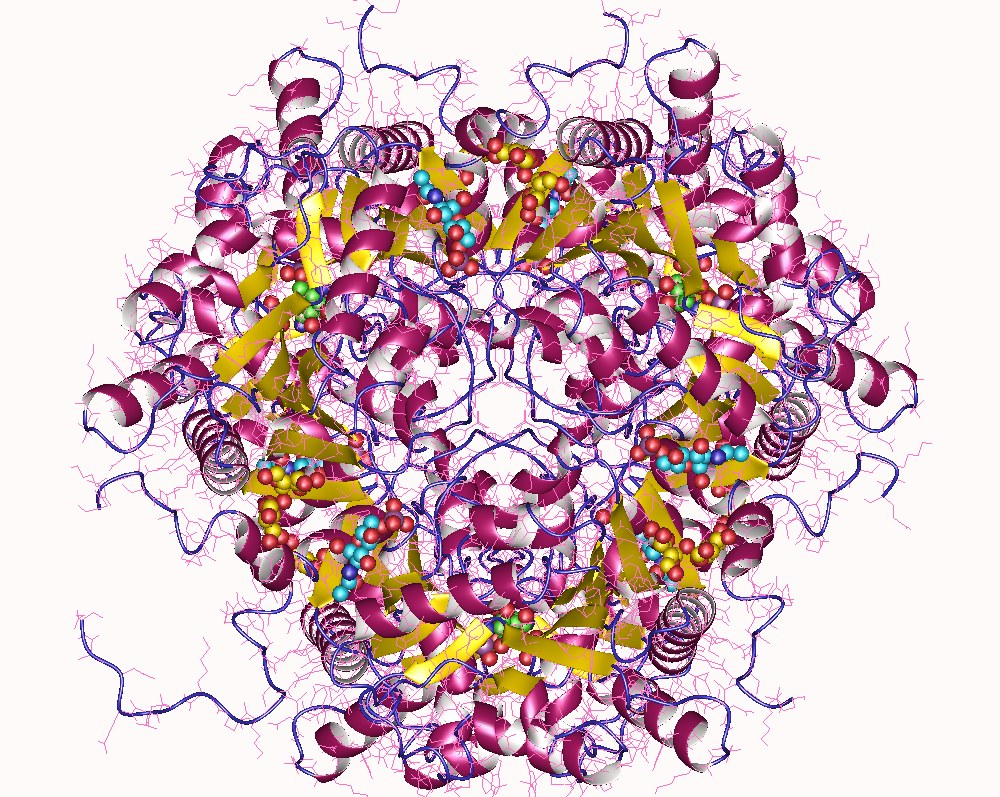
- Glucosamine-6-phosphate deaminase hexamer, Human

Identifiers
- EC no.: 3.5.99.6
- CAS no.: 9013-10-9

Databases
- BRENDA: enzyme data
- ExPASy: NiceZyme view
- KEGG: enzyme entry
- MetaCyc: metabolic pathway
- Rhea: reactions
- PDB structures: RCSB PDB PDBe PDBsum
- Gene Ontology: AmiGO / QuickGO
Search
- PMC: articles
- PubMed: articles
- NCBI: proteins

Glucosamine-6-phosphate deaminase (EC 3.5.99.6) is an enzyme that catalyzes the chemical reaction:

glucosamine 6-phosphate
H_{2}O
NH_{3}
fructose 6-phosphate

The catalytic mechanism of the reaction has been shown to proceed by ring opening and imine formation. This is the final specific step in the pathway of N-acetylglucosamine utilization and the 6-phosphate of that compound activates the enzyme but is not converted by it.

This enzyme is a hydrolase, one acting on carbon-nitrogen bonds other than peptide bonds. The systematic name of this enzyme class is 2-amino-2-deoxy-D-glucose-6-phosphate aminohydrolase (ketol isomerizing). Other names in use include glucosaminephosphate isomerase, glucosamine-6-phosphate isomerase, phosphoglucosaminisomerase, glucosamine phosphate deaminase, aminodeoxyglucosephosphate isomerase, and phosphoglucosamine isomerase.

== Structural studies ==
As of late 2007, five structures have been solved for this class of enzymes, with PDB accession codes PDB: 1J5X, PDB: 1JT9, PDB: 1NE7, PDB: 2BKV, and PDB: 2BKX.
