= Glutamine—fructose-6-phosphate transaminase (isomerizing) =

Glutamine-fructose-6-phosphate transaminase (isomerizing)
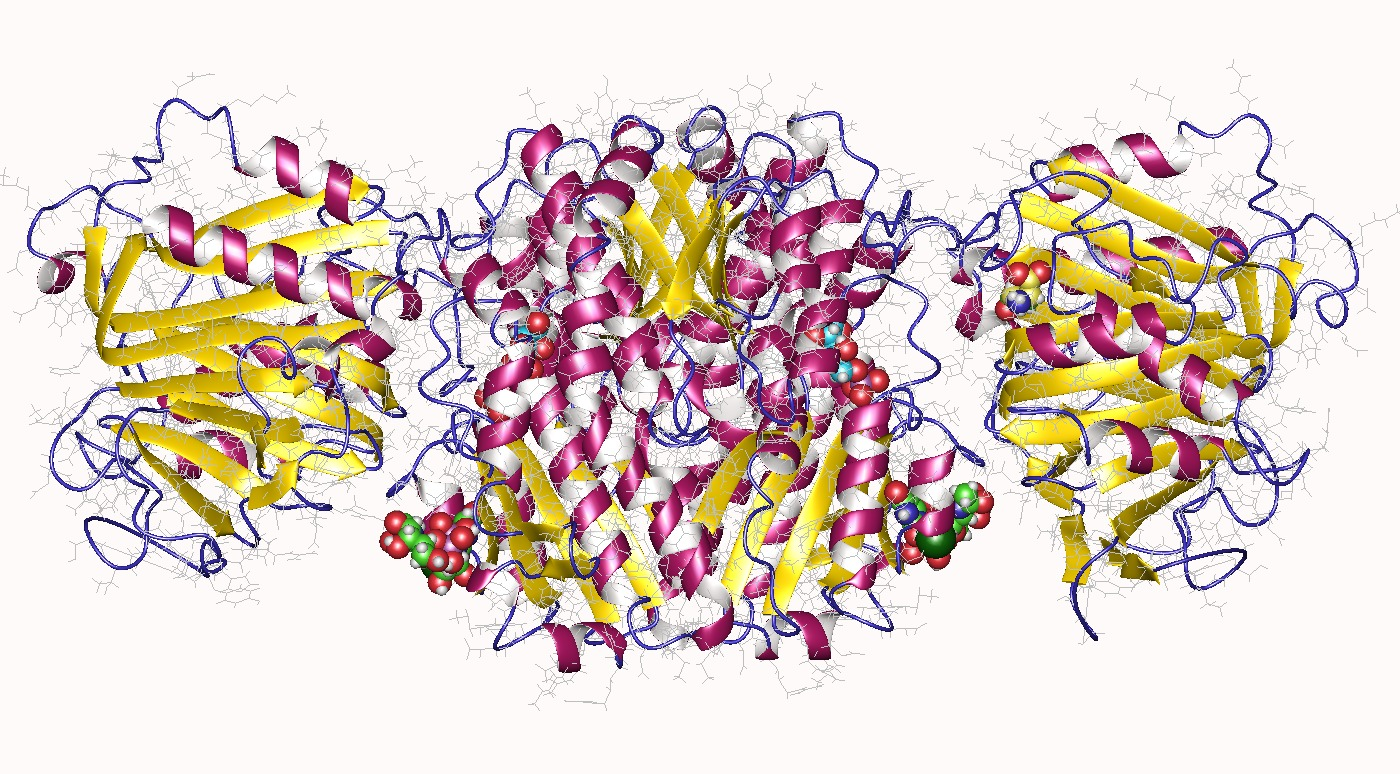
- Glutamine—fructose-6-phosphate transaminase 1, homodimer, Human

Identifiers
- EC no.: 2.6.1.16
- CAS no.: 9030-45-9
- Alt. names: hexosephosphate aminotransferase; glucosamine-6-phosphate isomerase (glutamine-forming); glutamine-fructose-6-phosphate transaminase (isomerizing); D-fructose-6-phosphate amidotransferase; glucosaminephosphate isomerase; glucosamine 6-phosphate synthase; GlcN6P synthase

Databases
- BRENDA: enzyme data
- ExPASy: NiceZyme view
- KEGG: enzyme entry
- MetaCyc: metabolic pathway
- Rhea: reactions
- PDB structures: RCSB PDB PDBe PDBsum
- Gene Ontology: AmiGO / QuickGO
Search
- PMC: articles
- PubMed: articles
- NCBI: proteins

Glutamine-fructose-6-phosphate transaminase (isomerizing) sometimes called glucosaminephosphate isomerase (EC 2.6.1.16) is an enzyme that catalyzes the chemical reaction:

L-glutamine
+
fructose 6-phosphate
L-glutamic acid
+
D-glucosamine 6-phosphate

The two substrates of this enzyme first characterised from Neurospora crassa are L-glutamine and D-fructose 6-phosphate (shown in its open-chain ketone form). Its products are L-glutamic acid and D-glucosamine 6-phosphate.

This enzyme is a transferase, specifically a transaminase, which transfer nitrogenous groups. The systematic name of this enzyme class is L-glutamine:D-fructose-6-phosphate isomerase (deaminating). This enzyme participates in glutamate metabolism and aminosugars metabolism.

== Structural studies ==
As of late 2007, 12 structures have been solved for this class of enzymes, with PDB accession codes PDB: 1JXA, PDB: 1MOQ, PDB: 1MOR, PDB: 1MOS, PDB: 1XFF, PDB: 1XFG, PDB: 2BPL, PDB: 2J6H, PDB: 2POC, PDB: 2PUT, PDB: 2PUV, and PDB: 2PUW.
