= N,N'-diacetylchitobiose phosphorylase =

Class of enzymes

Identifiers
- EC no.: 2.4.1.280

Databases
- IntEnz: IntEnz view
- BRENDA: BRENDA entry
- ExPASy: NiceZyme view
- KEGG: KEGG entry
- MetaCyc: metabolic pathway
- PRIAM: profile
- PDB structures: RCSB PDB PDBe PDBsum
Search
- PMC: articles
- PubMed: articles
- NCBI: proteins

N,N'-diacetylchitobiose phosphorylase (EC 2.4.1.280, chbP (gene)) is an enzyme with the systematic name N,N'-diacetylchitobiose:phosphate N-acetyl-D-glucosaminyltransferase. This enzyme was found in the genus Vibrio initially but has now been found in Escherichia coli as well as many other bacteria. In fact, Escherichia coli can replicate on a medium of N,N'-diacetylchitobiose as the sole source of carbon. The enzyme has also been found in multiple eukaryotic cells as well, especially in eukaryotes that make chitin and break chitin down. It is believed that N,N'-diacetylchitobiose phosphorylase is an integral part of the phosphoenolpyruvate:glucose phosphotransferase system (PTS). It is assumed that it is involved with Enzyme Complex II of the PTS and is involved with the synthesis of chitin.

This enzyme catalyses the following chemical reaction:

N,N'-diacetylchitobiose
P_{i}
N-acetyl-D-glucosamine
+
N-acetyl-α-D-glucosamine 1-phosphate

The enzyme is specific for N,N'-diacetylchitobiose.

== Mechanism ==
The mechanism for this reaction is as follows: the enzymatic phosphorolysis of N,N’-diacetylchitobiose phosphorylase begins with the direct nucleophilic attack to the glycosidic bond with the aid of D492 or aspartic acid residue 492 of the active site of the enzyme, which donates a proton to the glycosidic oxygen atom, and then proceeds through an oxocarbenium cation activated by ion-like transition state.
