= August Eduard Cunitz =

French Protestant theologian

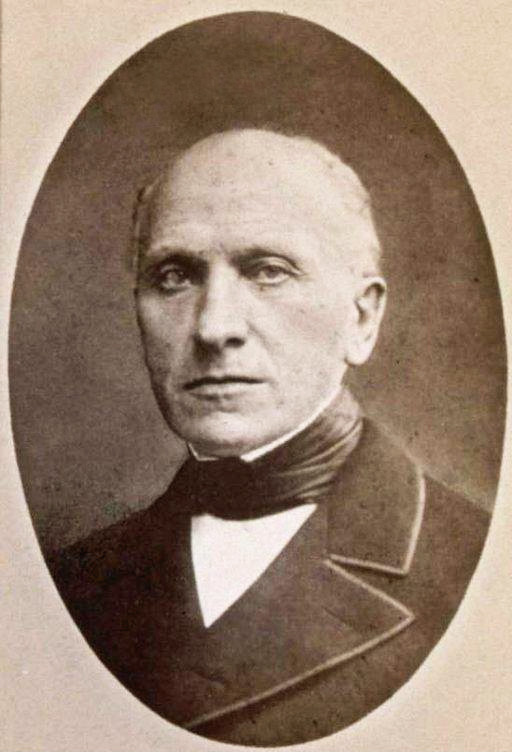
August Eduard Cunitz

August Eduard Cunitz (29 August 1812, in Strasbourg – 16 June 1886, in Strasbourg) was a French Protestant theologian.

He studied at the University of Strasbourg, becoming a lecturer at the Protestant seminary in 1837. In 1857 he became an associate professor, followed by a full professorship in 1864. From 1872 onward, he held a similar position in the re-organized faculty of theology at the university.

== Selected works ==
With Édouard Guillaume Eugène Reuss, he edited the Beiträge zu den theologischen Wissenschaften (6 volumes, 1847–55). With Reuss and Johann Wilhelm Baum, he edited the works of John Calvin, Ioannis Calvini Opera quae supersunt omnia (59 volumes, 1863–1900). Other written efforts by Cunitz include:

- De Nicolai II. decreto de electione pontificum Romanorum, 1837.
- Considerations historiques sur le développement du droit ecclésiastique protestant en France, 1840 – Historical considerations on the development of Protestant ecclesiastical law in France.
- Histoire ecclésiastique des églises réformées au royaume de France (with Johann Wilhelm Baum; 3 volumes, 1883–89) – Ecclesiastical history of Reformed churches in the Kingdom of France.
- Ein Katharisches Rituale, 1852 – A Cathar ritual.
