= Lothar Ledderose =

German art history professor (born 1942)

Lothar Ledderose (born 12 July 1942 in Munich) is a German professor of the History of Art of Eastern Asia at the University of Heidelberg. He received the Balzan Prize in 2005.

== Life ==
After graduating from the Apostelgymnasium of Cologne he studied East-Asian as well as European History of Art, Sinology and Japanology at the universities of Cologne, Bonn, Paris, Taipei and Heidelberg.

He did postgraduate research at Princeton University and Harvard University (1969–1971) and worked as a translator at Taipei's National Palace Museum (1971–1972). He then became a researcher at Tokio University's Oriental Cultural Institute (1973–1975) and at the Museum of East Asian Art in Berlin. (1975–1976). He successfully submitted his habilitationsschrift at the University of Cologne in 1976.

He is, as of 1984, a corresponding member of the Deutschen Archäologischen Institut (German Archeological Institute) and the British Academy (as of 1996) as well as, since 1986, a full member of the Heidelberger Akademie der Wissenschaften. He has been a board member of the Deutschen Morgenländischen Gesellschaft (German Oriental Society) and, in 1986, president of the ICANAS (International Congress of Asian and North-African Studies) in Hamburg

He was fellow and visiting professor at a great number of academic institutions, among which should be mentioned: Fellow of the Wissenschaftskolleg in Berlin (1983–1984), Senior Mellon Fellow at the Center for Advanced Study in the Visual Arts in Washington (1990–1991), Slade Professor at the University of Cambridge (1992), Murphy Lecturer at the University of Kansas (1994), visiting professor at the Universities of Chicago (1996), Taiwan (1997) and Kyoto (1997), as well as Mellon Lecturer at the National Gallery of Art in Washington (1998) and Scholar at the Getty Research Institute in Los Angeles (2000–2001).

== Work ==
Professor Ledderose has been editor of academic journals including "Arts Asiatiques" in Paris, "Meishushi yanjiu jikan" in Taipei, "Bulletin of the Museum of Far Eastern Antiquities" in Stockholm and "Scuola di Studi sull'Asia Orientale" in Kyoto

On the occasion of Ledderose's retirement in 2010, an international conference was held from 10 to 12 July at the Cluster of Excellence "Asia and Europe in a Global Context" at Heidelberg University. Under the title "Living Legacies: The History of East Asian Art Reconsidered", experts from Harvard, Princeton, Cambridge, Oxford and other renowned Universities discuss about theoretical and methodological developments in the History of East Asian Art.

His Ten Thousand Things: Module and Mass Production in Chinese Art (2000), which the Association for Asian Studies awarded the Joseph Levenson Book Prize for 2002, argues that modular or standardized production systems were the basis for a wide range of Chinese art, including bronzes, terra-cotta figurines, lacquer, porcelain, architecture, printing, and painting. The Levenson committee commented that "in bridging the divides between 'high art' and 'craft,' connoisseurship and social production, as well as philology and political history, this book is a milestone in the study of art history and material cultures in China. In arguing that Chinese art and culture are just as dynamic as those in Europe, albeit with very different concepts of 'art' and 'creativity,' Professor Ledderose has opened doors for new comparative studies that do justice to both global frameworks and cultural specificities."

== Selected bibliography ==
An author of more than 170 books and articles, among Ledderose's most notable works are:

- Die Siegelschrift (chuan-shu) in der Ch'ing-Zeit. Wiesbaden, 1970;
- Mi Fu and the Classical Tradition of Chinese Calligraphy. Princeton University Press, 1979;
- Im Schatten hoher Bäume. Malerei der Ming- und Qing-Dynastien (1368–1911) aus der Volksrepublik China. Baden-Baden, Köln, Hamburg, 1985;
- Palastmuseum Peking. Schätze aus der Verbotenen Stadt. Berlin, Wien (authored with Herbert Butz), 1985;
- Studien zur Kalligraphie der Jin und Tang Dynastie. Ein deutscher Gelehrter spricht über Chinesische Kalligraphie, Peking, 1990;
- Jenseits der Grossen Mauer. Der erste Kaiser von China und seine Terrakotta-Armee. Dortmund (authored with Adele Schlombs), 1991;
- Japan und Europa: 1543–1929. Berlin (authored with Doris Croissant), 1993;
- Orchideen und Felsen: Chinesische Bilder im Museum für Ostasiatische Kunst Berlin. Berlin, 1998;
- Ten Thousand Things: Module and Mass Production in Chinese Art. Princeton University Press, 2000.

His most important scholarly articles are:

- "Subject Matter in Early Chinese Painting Criticism." Oriental Art, New Series, vol. 19, n° 1, p. 69-83, 1973;
- "Some Observations on the Imperial Art Collection in China." Transactions of the Oriental Ceramic Society, vol. 43, p. 33-46, 1978/79;
- "The Earthly Paradise: Religious Elements in Chinese Landscape Art." Theories of the Arts in China. Edited by Susan Bush and Christian F. Murck, p. 165-183. Princeton University Press, 1983;
- "Some Taoist Elements in the Calligraphy of the Six Dynasties." T’oung Pao, 70, p. 246-278, 1984;
- "Chinese Calligraphy: Its Aesthetic Dimension and Social Function." Orientations, p. 35-50, (October, 1986);
- "Die Gedenkhalle für Mao Zedong: Ein Beispiel von Gedächtnisarchitektur." Kultur und Gedächtnis, Jan Assmann und Tonio Hölscher (eds.), p. 311-339. Frankfurt, 1988;
- "Chinese Influence on European Art: Sixteenth to Eighteenth Centuries." China and Europe. Edited by Thomas H.C. Lee, p. 221-249. Hong Kong, 1991;
- "Carving Sutras into Stone before the Catastrophe." Proceedings of the British Academy, vol. 125, p. 381-454 (2004).
