= Glucosamine =

Organic chemical compound

Stereo structural formula of glucosamine ((2S,6R)-6-meth,-2-ol)
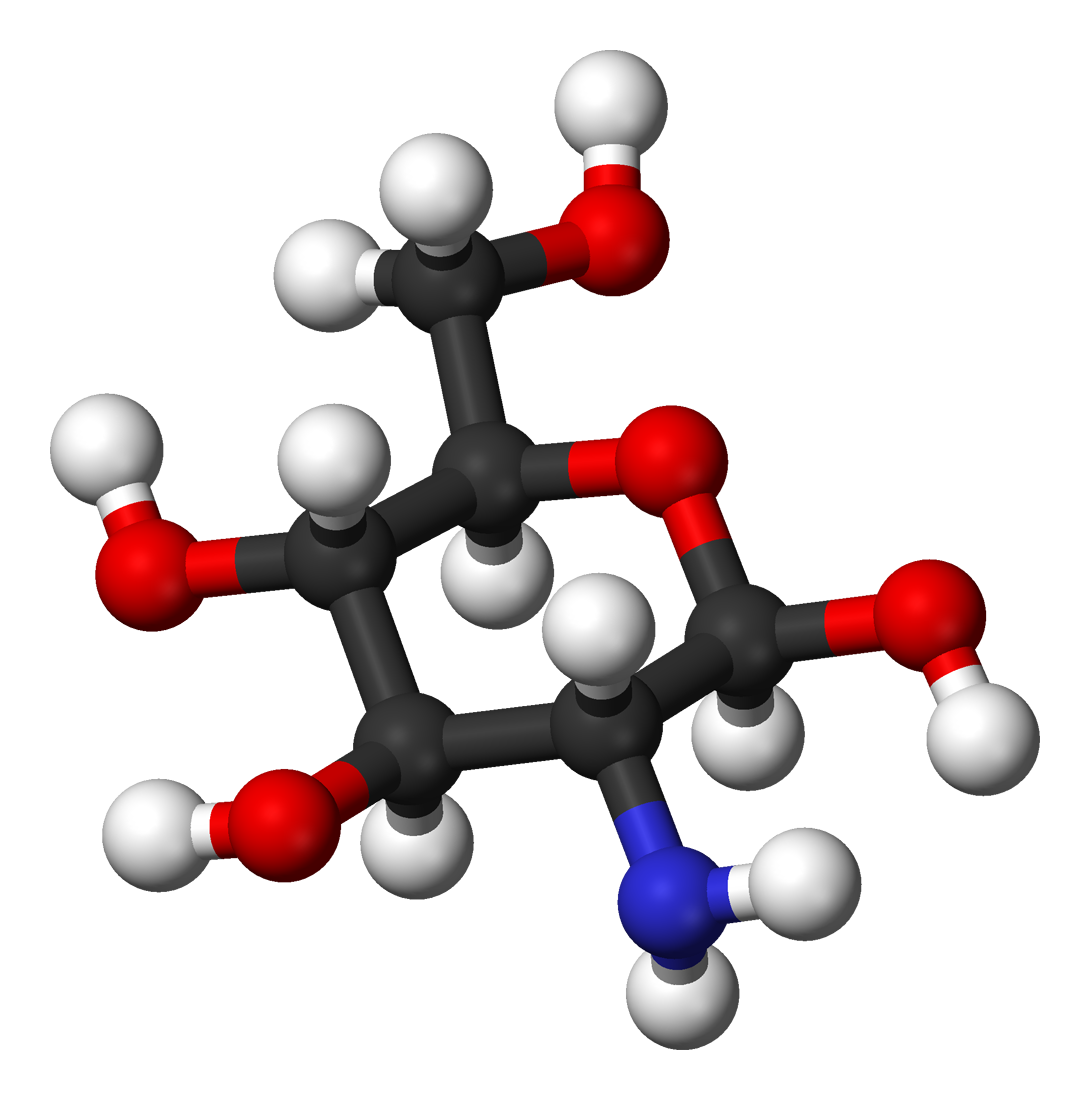
Ball and stick model of glucosamine ((2R,6R)-6-meth,-2-ol)

Names
- IUPAC name 2-Amino-2-deoxy-glucose
- Systematic IUPAC name (3R,4R,5S)-3-Amino-6-(hydroxymethyl)oxane-2,4,5-triol
- Other names Chitosamine

Identifiers
CAS Number	3416-24-8
3D model (JSmol)	Interactive image
Beilstein Reference	1723616
ChEBI	CHEBI:5417
ChEMBL	ChEMBL493287
ChemSpider	388352
DrugBank	DB01296
ECHA InfoCard	100.020.284
EC Number	222-311-2
Gmelin Reference	720725
KEGG	D04334
MeSH	Glucosamine
PubChem CID	439213
UNII	N08U5BOQ1K
CompTox Dashboard (EPA)	DTXSID4023098
- InChI: InChI=1S/C6H13NO5/c7-3-5(10)4(9)2(1-8)12-6(3)11/h2-6,8-11H,1,7H2/t2?,3-,4-,5-,6?/m1/s1 Key: MSWZFWKMSRAUBD-SPZCMYQFSA-N
- SMILES: N[C@H]1C(O)OC(CO)[C@@H](O)[C@@H]1O

Properties
Chemical formula	C_{6}H_{13}NO_{5}
Molar mass	179.172 g·mol^{−1}
Density	1.563 g/mL
Melting point	150 °C (302 °F; 423 K)
log P	−2.175
Acidity (pK_{a})	7.5
Basicity (pK_{b})	4.5

Pharmacology
ATC code	M01AX05 (WHO)
Legal status	EU: Authorized
- Except where otherwise noted, data are given for materials in their standard state (at 25 °C [77 °F], 100 kPa). verify (what is ?) Infobox references

Glucosamine (C_{6}H_{13}NO_{5}) is an amino sugar and a prominent precursor in the biochemical synthesis of glycosylated proteins and lipids. Glucosamine is part of the structure of two polysaccharides, chitosan and chitin. Glucosamine is one of the most abundant monosaccharides. It is produced commercially by the hydrolysis of shellfish exoskeletons or, less commonly, by fermentation of a grain such as corn or wheat. Glucosamine has various names depending on the country and its intended use.

Although a common dietary supplement, there is little clinical evidence that it is effective for relief of arthritis or pain, and is not an approved prescription drug in most countries, although it is listed as a medicinal product in Europe. Worldwide, there are no clinical organizations that recommend use of glucosamine as a treatment for arthritis.

== Absence of clinical recommendations ==
No national clinical organizations recommend use of glucosamine for relief from arthritis. These include medical associations in Australia, Canada, the European Society for Clinical and Economic Aspects of Osteoporosis and Osteoarthritis, the United Kingdom National Institute for Health and Care Excellence, the United States National Center for Complementary and Integrative Health, and the American College of Rheumatology and American Arthritis Foundation.

=== Recommendations against use ===
Several clinical organizations have explicitly recommended against use of glucosamine to treat arthritis, stating that it has not been proven to be effective, that it may have negative interactions with prescription drugs, and that it may cause allergic reactions in people sensitive to shellfish, a common starting material in glucosamine manufacturing. The American College of Rheumatology and American Arthritis Foundation stated that "glucosamine is strongly recommended against in patients with knee, hip, and/or hand osteoarthritis".

== Dietary supplement ==
Oral glucosamine is a dietary supplement and is not a prescription drug in the United States. Glucosamine is marketed as a supplement to support the structure and function of joints, and the marketing is targeted to people with osteoarthritis. Commonly sold forms of glucosamine are glucosamine sulfate, glucosamine hydrochloride, and N-acetylglucosamine. Of the three commonly available forms of glucosamine, only glucosamine sulfate is given a "likely effective" rating for treating osteoarthritis. Glucosamine is often sold in combination with other supplements such as chondroitin sulfate and methylsulfonylmethane.

Glucosamine, along with commonly used chondroitin, is not routinely prescribed to treat people who have symptomatic osteoarthritis of the knee, as there is insufficient evidence that this treatment is helpful.

As is common with heavily promoted dietary supplements, the claimed benefits of glucosamine are based principally on individual clinical and laboratory studies. Clinical studies on glucosamine efficacy are divided, with some reporting relief from arthritic pain and stiffness, while most studies report no conclusive benefit above placebo.

== Adverse effects and drug interactions ==
Glucosamine with or without chondroitin elevates the international normalized ratio (INR) in individuals who are taking the anticoagulant warfarin.

Adverse effects are mild and infrequent, including stomach upset, constipation, diarrhea, headache, and rash.

Since glucosamine is usually derived from the shells of shellfish, it may be unsafe for those with shellfish allergy. Many manufacturers of glucosamine derived from shellfish include a warning that those with a seafood allergy should consult a healthcare professional before taking the product.

== Biochemistry ==
Glucosamine is naturally present in the shells (exoskeletons) of shellfish, animal bones, bone marrow, and fungi. D-Glucosamine is made naturally in the form of glucosamine-6-phosphate, and is the biochemical precursor of all nitrogen-containing sugars. Specifically in humans, glucosamine-6-phosphate is synthesized from fructose 6-phosphate and glutamine by glutamine—fructose-6-phosphate transaminase as the first step of the hexosamine biosynthesis pathway. The end-product of this pathway is uridine diphosphate N-acetylglucosamine (UDP-GlcNAc), which is then used for making glycosaminoglycans, proteoglycans, and glycolipids.

As the formation of glucosamine-6-phosphate is the first step for the synthesis of these products, glucosamine may be important in regulating their production; however, the way that the hexosamine biosynthesis pathway is actually regulated, and whether this could be involved in contributing to human disease remains unclear.

== Manufacturing ==
Most glucosamine is manufactured by processing chitin from the exoskeletons of shellfish, including shrimp, lobsters, and crabs.

== History ==
Glucosamine was first prepared in 1876 by Georg Ledderhose by the hydrolysis of chitin with concentrated hydrochloric acid. The stereochemistry was not fully determined until the 1939 work of Walter Haworth.

== Legal status ==
=== United States ===
In the United States, glucosamine is not approved by the Food and Drug Administration (FDA) for medical use in humans. Because glucosamine is classified as a dietary supplement in the United States, the FDA requires evidence of its safety, but not its effectiveness, as long as it is not marketed as a treatment for any medical condition.

In 2004, the FDA declared there was insufficient evidence for supplement manufacturers to state that glucosamine was effective for treating arthritis, joint degeneration, or cartilage deterioration, a position remaining in effect, as of 2025.

=== Europe ===
In most of Europe, glucosamine is approved as a medical drug and is sold in the form of glucosamine sulfate.

The Task Force of the European League Against Rheumatism (EULAR) committee has granted glucosamine sulfate a level of toxicity of 5 on a 0–100 scale. By 2014, OARSI no longer recommended glucosamine for disease modification and deemed its effectiveness for symptom relief in knee osteoarthritis as "uncertain." A 2016 review concluded that only the formulated prescription-only patented crystalline glucosamine sulfate had efficacy in the treatment of arthritis.

=== Class-action lawsuits ===
In 2013, without admitting fault, manufacturer Rexall Sundown and NBTY agreed to pay up to US$2 million to settle consumer claims related to the wording of certain claims on the packaging of glucosamine bottles sold at Costco under the Kirkland label.

In August 2012, a class-action lawsuit was filed in New York claiming that 21st Century Healthcare, Inc. had falsely advertised that its "Glucosamine 750 Chondroitin 600 Triple Strength" dietary supplements would restore lost cartilage. In April 2013, a San Diego man launched a proposed class-action lawsuit in the United States District Court for the Central District of California accusing Nutramax Laboratories, Walmart, and Rite Aid of falsely advertising the effectiveness of glucosamine.

== Research ==
=== Humans ===
Because glucosamine is a precursor for glycosaminoglycans, and glycosaminoglycans are a major component of cartilage, research has focused on the potential for supplemental glucosamine to improve cartilage structure and alleviate arthritis, but there is little evidence from clinical trials that it is effective for alleviating arthritis pain.

A 2023 review concluded that there was weak evidence from clinical studies that glucosamine and chondroitin when combined were effective in relieving the pain of knee osteoarthritis, with most results not attaining statistical significance.

==== Bioavailability ====
Two studies measured the concentrations of glucosamine in the synovial fluid and plasma after oral administration of glucosamine sulfate to both healthy volunteers and people with osteoarthritis.

In the first study, glucosamine sulfate was given to healthy volunteers in doses of 750, 1,500, or 3,000 mg once daily. In the second study, oral glucosamine sulfate capsules (1,500 mg) were given daily for two weeks to 12 people with osteoarthritis. Glucosamine concentrations in plasma and synovial fluid increased significantly from baseline levels, and the levels in the two fluids were highly correlated. The authors interpreted that these levels could be biologically advantageous to articular cartilage, but the levels are still ten to one hundred times lower than required to positively influence the cartilage (chondrocytes) to build new tissue. Glucosamine sulfate uptake in synovial fluid may be as much as 20%, or it could be negligible, indicating no biological significance.

== Veterinary medicine ==
=== Dogs ===
Some studies have demonstrated efficacy of glucosamine supplementation for dogs with osteoarthritis pain, particularly in combination with other nutraceuticals like chondroitin, while others have not. A trial of oral combination capsules (glucosamine, chondroitin, and manganese ascorbate) in dogs with osteoarthritis found no benefit on either gait analysis or subjective assessments by the veterinarian or owner.

=== Horses ===
The use of glucosamine in equine medicine is recognized; however, a meta-analysis deemed the existing research too flawed to effectively guide the treatment of horses.

Several studies have measured the bioavailability of glucosamine after oral administration to horses. When given as a single oral dose (9 g) with or without chondroitin sulfate (3 g) to ten horses, glucosamine (hydrochloride) was detected in the blood with a maximum level of 10.6±6.9 μg/mL at two hours after dosing. Another study examined both the serum and the joint synovial fluid after nasogastric (oral) or intravenous administration of 20 mg/kg glucosamine hydrochloride to eight adult horses. Although joint fluid concentrations of glucosamine reached 9–15 μmol/L following intravenous dosing, it was only 0.3–0.7 μmol/L with nasogastric dosing. The authors calculated that these glucosamine synovial fluid levels achieved by the oral route were 500 times lower than required to positively affect the metabolism of cartilage cells. A follow-up study by the same research group compared glucosamine sulfate with glucosamine hydrochloride at the same dose (20 mg/kg) in eight horses and found a higher fluid concentration with the sulfate preparation (158 ng/mL compared to 89 ng/mL one hour post oral dose). They concluded that these higher synovial fluid levels obtained with the sulfate derivative were still too low to have a relevant biological effect on articular cartilage.

A three-month trial of an oral dosage regime of a commercial preparation of glucosamine sulfate, chondroitin sulfate, and methylsulfonylmethane was performed in veteran horses with no effect on gait stiffness, with exercise alone in the control group being effective. The intravenous use of a combination of N-acetylglucosamine, pentosan polysulfate, and sodium hyaluronate in horses with surgically-induced osteoarthritis saw improvements in X-ray changes to the cartilage but not histologically or in biochemical outcomes, suggesting more evidence is needed for this combination and route of administration.

== See also ==
- Chitobiose
- Trehalosamine
