= Albert Wigand (meteorologist) =

German physicist and meteorologist

Albert Wigand Dr. phil.
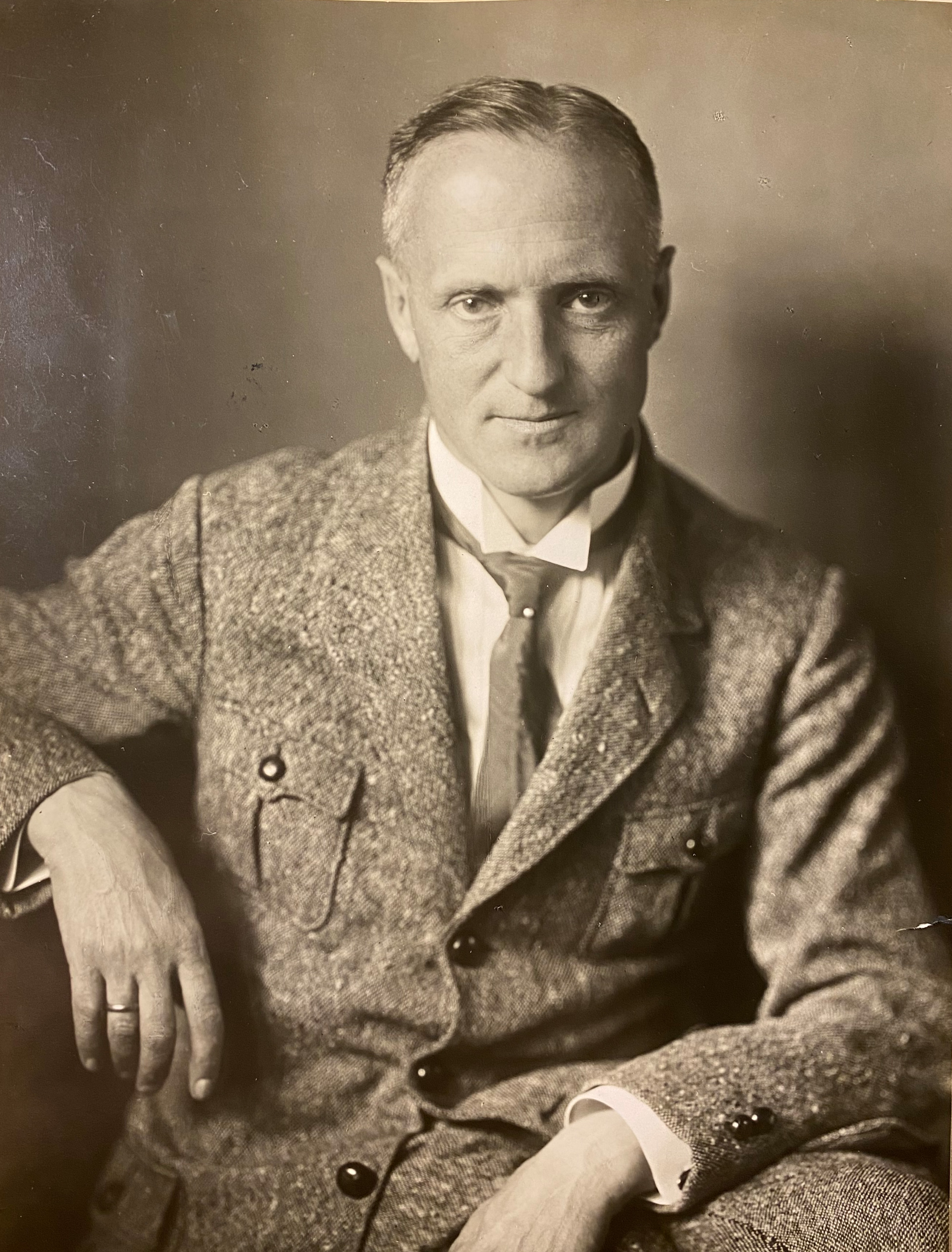
- Born: 21 October 1882; Kassel, Hesse-Nassau, Prussia
- Died: 18 December 1932 (aged 50); Hamburg, Prussia
- Education: Marburg University
- Scientific career
- Fields: Physics, Meteorology
- Thesis: "Über Temperaturabhängigkeit der spezifischen Wärme fester elemente und über spezifische Wärme und spezifisches Gewicht ihrer allotropen Modifikationen" (1905)
- Doctoral advisor: Franz Richarz

Ernst Heinrich Paul Albert Wigand (21 October 1882 – 18 December 1932), known as Albert Wigand, was a German professor who lectured in the fields of physics, geodesy, meteorology and climatology. His is most well known as one of the earliest physicists to successfully devise a method of studying fog and cloud matter in midair. In his later years, he became a fierce supporter of the xenophobic and nationalist thinking that would underpin Nazi ideology, and that association has clouded his legacy.

== Biography ==
=== Early life ===
Albert Wigand was born in Kassel, then part of the Prussian Province of Hesse-Nassau, to Dr. Paul Wigand, a Catholic Apostolic clergyman, and his wife Luise (née Thiersch; 12 September 1856 – 23 April 1919). He was a descendant of two old families of theologians and natural philosophers; his paternal grandfather (and namesake) was the botanist, pharmacologist and staunch creationist Albert Wigand, and his maternal grandfather was the philologist and theologian H. W. J. Thiersch. Through his father he was descended from the evangelical theologian Johann Jakob Pfeiffer and the jurist Friedrich Kulenkamp, and was a relative of Burkhard Wilhelm Pfeiffer, Louis Pfeiffer, Carl Jonas Pfeiffer, Franz Pfeiffer and Adolf von Deines. His mother's relatives included her aforementioned father, her grandfather Friedrich Thiersch, her brother Friedrich von Thiersch, her uncles Karl and Ludwig Thiersch, and her nephew Paul Thiersch.

After completing his studies at Frankfurt-am-Main's humanistic Lessing Gymnasium, Wigand studied natural sciences, mathematics, and philosophy from 1901 to 1906 at Marburg University and the Ludwig-Maximilians-Universität München. In 1906, he received the degree of Dr. phil. from Marburg University, where he completed his thesis Über Temperaturabhängigkeit der spezifischen Wärme fester elemente und über spezifische Wärme und spezifisches Gewicht ihrer allotropen Modifikationen (On the temperature dependence of the specific heat of solid elements and on the specific heat and specific gravity of their allotropic modifications) under his advisor, Dr. Franz Richarz. In the same year, he also passed the state propaedeutical examination for university-level instructors of physics, mathematics, chemistry, mineralogy and philosophy. Wigand worked as an assistant to his advisor Richarz until 1907, at which point he was engaged as an assistant to Wilhelm Hallwachs in the physics department at Technische Hochschule Dresden. In 1910, Wigand continued his career as an assistant in physics, this time at the Physical Institute of the University of Halle in Dorn, and in 1911 became qualified as a Privatdozent in physics and physical chemistry.

During the First World War, Wigand was wounded in combat, and was awarded the Iron Cross, 2nd class. After his injury, he was recommissioned as a lieutenant in the Luftstreitkräfte reserve, monitoring local weather conditions from the command center in Charlottenburg. It was also during this period that Wigand met and married Else von Hippel (21 August 1895 – 18 December 1932), daughter of the German ophthalmologist, Eugen von Hippel.

=== Scientific career ===
Wigand had achieved full professorship by 1917, and in 1921 he was working as an adjunct professor (nichtbeamteter außerordentlicher Professor) at the University of Halle. At some point between 1917 and 1922, Wigand became acquainted with Albert Einstein, who was at the time the director of the Kaiser Wilhelm Institute for Physics. Einstein was instrumental in approving an institutional grant to support Wigand's research into aeronautics. This acquaintance led to a years-long correspondence between the two on matters of physics and their shared interest in the development of the science. In 1925, Wigand accepted a position as professor of physics and meteorology at the Landwirtschaftliche Hochschule Hohenheim-Stuttgart (now the University of Hohenheim), while also teaching courses in meteorology at the Technische Hochschule Stuttgart.

Wigand's particular scientific focus was on clouds, especially Cloud condensation nuclei, their origin, and the effect they had on both clouds and objects passing through them. He was also particularly interested in the role of CCNs as cloud seeds, especially as it pertained to their possible importance in the then-theoretical science of Weather modification. Indeed, as part of his study of cloud matter, Wigand was one of the first scientists to successfully collect and study cloud particles in midair.

In early 1929, Wigand travelled to the United States, at the instigation of Albert Einstein, where he worked with Louis A. Bauer in the Department of Terrestrial Magnetism at the Carnegie Institution for Science. Soon after returning to Prussia, Wigand was invited by University of Hamburg to occupy the newly established chair of the department of Meteorology, a continuation of the position once held by Alfred Wegener. Directorship of the University of Hamburg Meteorological Institute also entailed directing the Deutsche Seewarte's Meteorological Experiment Station. On 4 July 1931 Wigand was appointed rector of the University of Hamburg for the period 1 October 1931 to 30 September 1932. Wigand's rectorship at the University of Hamburg proved to be his last important post, and he left a mark in that role. He was a staunch opponent of the Weimar Republic, and actively supported the nationalist and socialist elements within the student body. He was quoted as having described German politics as an "Augean stable" that needed cleansing from the "stain" of "foreign influence," and even took it upon himself to introduce classes in military science to the curriculum, promising to "lead his students into a riot with banners flying". After his death in 1932, the student body presented the university with a bronze bust of Wigand at the 1933 Labor Day celebrations. For many years after, the bust was the site of gatherings of Nazi and Nazi-sympathizing students, which ultimately led to the toppling of the bust by student activists in 2007.

== Published works ==
- Über Temperaturabhängigkeit der spezifischen Wärme fester Elemente und über spezifische Wärme und spezifisches Gewicht ihrer allotropen Modifikationen (D. Phil.). Marburg: R. Friederich's Universitäts-Buchdruckerei. 1905.
- "Statik und Kinetik der Umwandlung im flüssigen Schwefel und die Schmelzwärme des monoklinen Schwefels". Z. Phys. Chem. 63. Berlin: De Gruyter: 273–306. 1908.
- "Der Zustand erstarrter Schwefelschmelzen". Z. Phys. Chem. 72. Berlin: De Gruyter: 752–758. 1910.
- "Die Löslichkeit des "unlöslichen Schwefels"". Z. Phys. Chem. 75. Berlin: De Gruyter: 235–244. 1911.
- "Die umkehrbare Lichtreaktion des Schwefels". Z. Phys. Chem. 77. Berlin: De Gruyter: 423–471. 1911.
- "Physikalische Probleme für Hochfahrten im Freiballon". Mitt. D. Naturf. Ges. Halle A. D. S. 3. Halle: H. W. Schmidt. 1913.
- "Über die Natur der Kondensationskerne in der Atmosphäre insbesondere über die Kernwirkung von Staub und Rauch". Meteorol. Z. 30: 10–18. 1913.
- "Messungen der elektrischen Leitfähigkeit in der freien Atmosphäre bis 9000 m Höhe". Verh. D. Deutschen Physik. Ges. 16: 232–239. 1914.
- Wigand, Albert (1914). "Measurements of the electrical conductivity in the free atmosphere up to 9,000 meters in height". Terr. Magn. Atmos. Electr. 19 (2): 93–101. Bibcode:1914TeMAE..19...93W. doi:10.1029/TE019i002p00093.
- "Mesures de conductibilité électrique dans l'atmosphère libre jusqu'à 9000 mètres d'altitude". Le Radium. 11 (7): 204–208. 1914.
- Abderhalden, E., ed. (1914). "Wissenschaftliche Hochfahrten im Freiballon". Fortschritte der naturwissenschaftlichen Forschung. Vol. X. Berlin & Wien.
- Wigand, Albert. "Die vertikale Verteilung der Kondensationskerne in der freien Atmosphäre." Annalen der Physik 364, no. 16 (1919): 689–741.
- Wigand, A. (1919). a Method of Measuring Visibility. Monthly Weather Review, 47(11), 808-808.
- Wigand, A. (1921). Die elektrische Leitfähigkeit in der freien Atmosphäre, nach Messungen bei Hochfahrten im Freiballon. Annalen der Physik, 371(18), 81–109.
- Everling, E., & Wigand, A. (1921). Spannungsgefälle und vertikaler Leitungsstrom in der freien Atmosphäre, nach Messungen bei Hochfahrten im Freiballon. Annalen der Physik, 371(20), 261–282.
- Luftelektrische Untersuchungen bei Flugzeugaufstiegen. Berlin: Gebr. Borntraeger. 1925.
- Halle, A. S., & Wigand, A. (1925). Summary of atmospheric-electric investigations during airplane flights. Terrestrial Magnetism and Atmospheric Electricity, 30(1), 33–34.
- Wigand, A., & Kircher, K. (1927). Schnellwirkende luftelektrische Kollektoren. Gerlands Beitr. Geophys., 17, 379–379.
- Wigand, A., & Wenk, F. (1928). Der Gehalt der Luft an Radium-Emanation, nach Messungen bei Flugzeugaufstiegen. Annalen der Physik, 391(13), 657–686.
- Die Atmosphäre als Kolloid (with August Schmauß), 1929.
- Wigand, A., & Frankenberger, E. (1930). Stability and Coagulation of Mists and Clouds. Physik. Z, 31, 204–15.
