= Friedrich Pfeiffer =

German jurist and politician

Friedrich Moritz Christian Pfeiffer
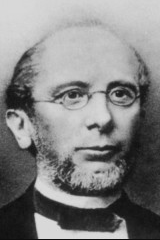
- Born: July 22, 1815; Kassel, Electorate of Hesse
- Died: April 12, 1879 (aged 63); Bremen, German Empire
- Education: University of Marburg, Heidelberg University, University of Göttingen
- Occupations: Lawyer, Member of parliament, Senator, Mayor
- Years active: 1836-1879

Friedrich Moritz Christian Pfeiffer (22 July 1815 – 12 April 1879) was a German jurist and politician.

== Biography ==
=== Early life and education ===
Pfeiffer was the son of the Hessian lawyer and politician Franz Georg Pfeiffer (11 January 1784 – 15 April 1856) and his wife Susanne (Susette) Friederike (née Lagisse, 6 April 1787 - 23 May 1861). His family was prominent in Hesse, beginning with his grandfather Johann Jakob Pfeiffer, Marburg University professor and dean, and personal religious tutor to the Elector of Hesse. Pfeiffers had also made a name for themselves in Hessian politics, particularly his father and his uncle Burkhard Wilhelm Pfeiffer. His other uncles included the lawyer Christian Hartmann Pfeiffer, and the bankers Carl Jonas Pfeiffer and Georg Pfeiffer. Among his cousins were Dr. Louis Pfeiffer, Dr. Albert Wigand, and General Adolf von Deines.

From 1826 to 1833, Pfeiffer attended the Friedrichsgymnasium Kassel, of which his grandfather, Johann Jakob Pfeiffer, had been the inaugural director. Due to the family into which he was born, politics and philosophy were regular topics of conversation, and Pfeiffer himself recounts his first real brush with political philosophy in 1827, while returning home to Kassel from a celebration in Marburg with his cousin Karl. Karl's passion for human rights and the dignity of man as they pertained to the conditions of the people of Congress Poland left a deep impact on Friedrich, which he himself would acknowledge years later. After graduating, he went on to study law, from 1833 to 1834 at University of Marburg, from 1834 to 1835 at Heidelberg University, and from 1835 to 1836 at the University of Göttingen. While a student at the University of Marburg, Pfeiffer joined the Corps Teutonia Marburg, a prominent German Student Corps. Following his transfer to Heidelberg, he joined the Corps Guestphalia Heidelberg, and later, the Corps Guestphalia Marburg. In 1836, he passed his faculty examination and graduated from Göttingen, at which point he relocated to Kassel to work as a trainee lawyer.

On 18 September 1842, he married his first cousin Sophie Luise Pfeiffer, the daughter of his father's identical twin brother, Christian Hartmann Pfeiffer.

=== Career ===
After passing additional examinations, he became an assessor at the higher court in Fulda in 1842 and at the higher court in Marburg in 1845. Pfeiffer's time in Marburg was particularly contentious, because the court expected him to help them perpetrate what in his eyes was an undue and unnecessary campaign against the Friends of the Light, a rationalist and humanist protestant sect then developing in Germany. His written decision regarding the group reflected his own liberal principles, and did little to endear him to his superiors on the court. In 1847 he became Amtmann in Felsberg and then state magistrate in Rotenburg an der Fulda. In addition to his legal positions, Pfeiffer also undertook duties a parliamentarian; from 1849 to 1850, he served in the Kurhessischen Ständeversammlung, where he was the acknowledged legal expert for the Constitutional Party. In 1850, having sufficiently angered Ludwig Hassenpflug during his time in parliament, Pfeiffer was relegated to the position of superior court judge in Fulda. Later that year, Pfeiffer was elected to the Volkshaus (lower house) of the Erfurt Union Parliament, and from 26 March to 29 April of that year, served in the capacity of secretary. In 1851, following the Hessian constitutional crisis under Hassenpflug, Pfeiffer retired from all official duties for the Hessian state.

Pfeiffer left Hesse and relocated to the Free Hanseatic City of Bremen, where he was welcomed and given full privileges as a citizen, including a seat on the Bürgerschaft of Bremen. This was not, however, a perfect solution to the problem he had left behind in Hesse, because adapting to a new city with new customs and people was stressful to both Pfeiffer and his family. He briefly considered attempting to regain a foothold in his fatherland by acquiring the deed to his family's now defunct paper mill in Niederkaufungen, but that plan proved fruitless. The subsequent birth of a second son to Pfeiffer and his wife eased the transition to life in Bremen. As the family acclimated, Pfeiffer was instrumental in the founding of Bremen's Kunstverein, as well as the Historical Society. From 1852 to 1864 Pfeiffer served as a high court attorney, and on 15 July 1864 he was elected a member of the Senate of Bremen, a post which he would hold until his death. From 1865 to 1874 he held the positions of Polizeiherr (police commissioner) and Senator für Sanitätswesen (senator in charge of public hygiene and sanitation). From 1 January 1876 until his death on 12 April 1879, Pfeiffer held the position of Mayor of Bremen and from 1 January to 31 December 1878, he also occupied the position of President of the Senate.

== See also ==
- List of mayors of Bremen
- Erfurt Union
