= Albert Wigand =

German botanist, pharmacologist and pharmacognostician

Julius Wilhelm Albert Wigand Dr. phil.
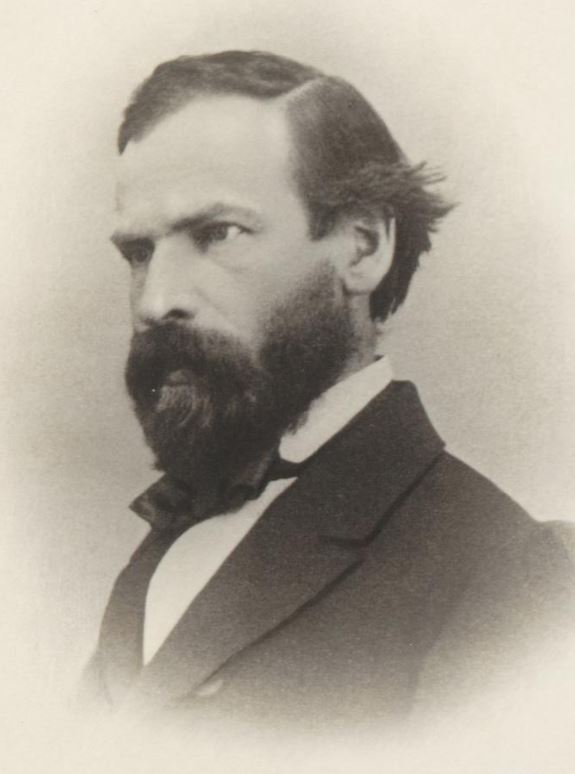
- Albert Wigand in c. 1875
- Born: 21 April 1821; Treysa, Electorate of Hesse
- Died: 22 October 1886 (aged 65); Marburg, Hesse-Nassau, Kingdom of Prussia
- Education: Philipps University of Marburg
- Spouse: Henriette Emma Vorster (m. 1851)
- Awards: 4th Class, Order of the Red Eagle
- Scientific career
- Fields: Botany, Pharmacology
- Thesis: "Kritik und Geschichte der Lehre von der Metamorphose der Pflanze" (1846)
- Doctoral advisor: Matthias Jakob Schleiden
- Author abbrev. (botany): Wigand

Julius Wilhelm Albert Wigand, known as Albert Wigand (April 21, 1821 – October 22, 1886), was a German botanist, pharmacologist and pharmacognostician. His is most well known for being the director of the Alter Botanischer Garten Marburg from 1861 to 1886, and for his opposition to Charles Darwin and the theory of Evolution on religious grounds.

== Early life and education ==
Wigand was born in the Hessian village of Treysa to Johann Heinrich Friederich Wigand (November 2, 178 – Jun 30, 1855), an apothecary, and his wife Sophie Christiane (née Kulenkamp; May 13, 1793 – November 24, 1859). Wigand's paternal grandmother Anna Dorothea (1750 – 1805) was the daughter of Dorothea Erxleben, who made history in her own right as the first woman in Germany to become a doctor of medical science. His grandfather, Anna Dorothea's husband, was Ludwig Christian Anton Wigand, an evangelical preacher, and this marriage of science and religion would come to be a guiding force in Wigand's personal and professional life. His mother's grandfather was Johann Jakob Pfeiffer, and her uncles included Burkhard Wilhelm Pfeiffer, Carl Jonas Pfeiffer and Franz Georg Pfeiffer; Dr. Louis Pfeiffer was his mother's first cousin. Other, more distant cousins, included Georg Ledderhose, Adolf von Deines, and Fredrick Willius.

Wigand's early education took place at home, with his father's practical pharmacological and scientific teaching being supplemented with a tutor for other more complex or esoteric subjects. In 1835, he was admitted into the Gymnasium Philippinum, whose director, August Vilmar, would exert a powerful influence on Wigand, particularly in matters of faith. Vilmar's teaching philosophy was the turn his students into christlichen Volksführern or "Christian leaders of men," and Wigand took this sense of purpose to heart.

After graduating from the Gymnasium in the Spring of 1840, Wigand enrolled at the Philipps University of Marburg, where he planned a course of study in mathematics and the natural sciences, with the ultimate goal of following in Vilmar's footsteps and himself becoming a gymnasium teacher. During his first year, as was customary in German universities at the time, he became a member of the student Corps Teutonia zu Marburg. To all appearances, Wigand had no botanical interests at this time, and in fact only took a single class on the subject with Georg Wilhelm Franz Wenderoth in the summer of 1843. By the end of that year, Wigand had successfully passed the qualifying examinations to become a teacher of mathematics, natural history, and philology, but the experience with Wenderoth seems to have lit a fire within him, because he spend the spring and summer of the following year, 1844, intensively studying botany. He travelled throughout Germany and Switzerland, and found himself in Munich, where he made the acquaintance of the legendary naturalist Gotthilf Heinrich von Schubert. Upon getting to know the young man, Schubert encouraged Wigand to go to Berlin. After he arrived in Berlin, Wigand studied geography under Carl Ritter, botany under Hermann Karsten, botanical drawing under Carl Sigismund Kunth, and microscopy under the tutelage of Christian Gottfried Ehrenberg, the father of microbiology.

In early 1845, Wigand took up a position working in the private laboratory of Matthias Schleiden in Jena, where he immersed himself in both botanical literature and the study of plant morphology. A year later, Wigand finally returned to Marburg with a completed doctoral thesis, Kritik und Geschichte der Lehre von der Metamorphose der Pflanze (A Critique and History of the Doctrine of Plant Metamorphosis), which he successfully defended. He was awarded the degree of Doctor of Philosophy on August 29, 1846.

Upon receiving his doctorate, Wigand worked as a private teacher of botany for almost four years. In early 1850, he embarked upon a 6-month whirlwind journey, which took him to Hamburg, up the Baltic coast, including Rügen, then via Berlin and the Harz mountains to Halle and Leipzig. Breslau and Prague were followed by Vienna, the Adriatic Sea near Trieste and Venice, and the return trip led via Munich. The following year, he petitioned the Electoral Interior Ministry for permission to be made a professor at the University of Marburg, and owing to Wenderoth's increasing age, and the necessity for a younger instructor to assist him in his work and ensure the longevity of the botany program, he was appointed assistant professor in March 1851.

== Marriage and family ==
On October 2, 1851, Albert Wigand married Harriett Emma Vorster (December 2, 1823 ‒ September 28, 1905) in his hometown of Treysa. Her parents were Carl Friedrich Vorster (January 3, 1788 ‒ November 25, 1828) and Charlotte Rose Françoise (née de Perrot; December 1, 1787 – February 28, 1862). Carl Vorster was a successful paper miller, and Charlotte's father, Jean François de Perrot, was a Huguenot, and a private secretary in the court of Frederick the Great of Prussia. They had nine children:

- Maria Sophie Rosa (1852 – 1929)
- Ernst Friedrich Paul (1853 ‒ 1921), married Luise Thiersch, daughter of H. W. J. Thiersch. Their son was the German meteorologist Albert Wigand.
- Karoline Sophie Klotilde (1855 ‒ 1855)
- Karoline Mathilde Meline Martha (1856 ‒ 1948)
- Konrad Franz Ferdinand (1858 ‒ 1911)
- Elisabeth Hanna Mathilde (1860 ‒ 1927), married Eduard Blocher; paternal grandmother of the Swiss billionaire Christoph Blocher.
- Heinrich Adolph (1862 ‒ 1862)
- Johanna Mathilde Emma (1863 ‒ 1949)
- Meline Sophie Marianne Elisabeth (1865 ‒ 1866)

== Teaching career and death ==
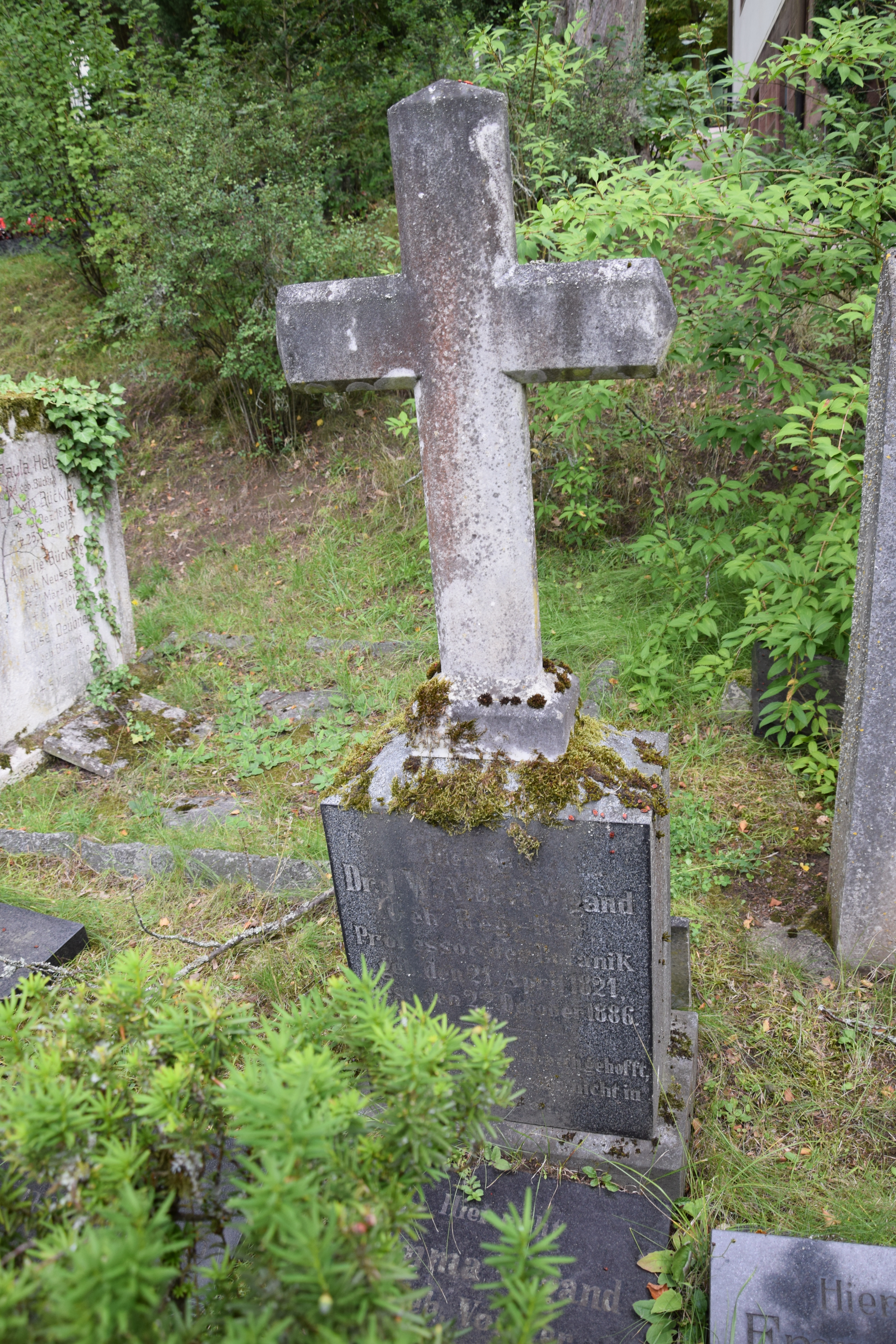
The grave of Dr. Albert Wigand

From 1851, Wigand was an assistant professor in the departments of botany and pharmacology at the University of Marburg. As part of his teaching, he also gave lessons in microscopy, having learned from one of the luminaries of the field. In 1854, the number of pharmacy students had increased to such a point that Wigand found it necessary to establish a medicinal garden for the students to use, rather than relying on ready-made ingredients from local apothecaries. In 1856, he became a member of Pharmacia, an honorary society for pharmacists founded by his cousin Friedrich Siebert that would go on to become Landsmannschaft Hasso-Borussia in 1891. By 1857, Wigand was the sole instructor of botany at the university, Professor Wenderoth having retired to devote his remaining years to the curation of the Alter Botanischer Garten Marburg. Following Wenderoth's death in 1861, Wigand petitioned the Ministry of Education in Kassel to be promoted to a full professor, and in December of that year, he was not only granted his promotion, but also appointed Wenderoth's successor as director and caretaker of the botanical garden. After Wenderoth's death, his heirs wanted the university to pay them for the right to keep his extensive herbarium, but the price they requested was exorbitant, and the Board of Regents refused, which resulted in the herbarium being destroyed. Wigand then spent the remainder of his career at the botanical garden rebuilding the lost collection, as well as enacting updates and changes in line with his theories about herbology and botany.

By the 1870s, Wigand found himself, along with the anthropologists Rudolf Virchow and Adolf Bastian, at the forefront of the movement to defy and disprove Charles Darwin's theory of Evolution. Unlike most of his contemporaries, Wigand's opposition to Darwin stemmed purely from his own Christian faith, as instilled in him by his early teachers and his family. Wigand saw Darwinism as both "a symptom and a cause of the pervasive atheism and arrogance of this age," which was "morally sick" for "[seizing] the opportunity to eliminate God and design." As prominent supporters of Darwin, Ernst Haeckel and Carl Vogt received a great deal of Wigand's ire, but he was not a man to mince words, and in fact sent copies of his own anti-Darwinian volumes to Charles Darwin himself.

In 1858, Wigand became a corresponding member of the Wetterauische Gesellschaft in Hanau, and in 1861 he was made a member of the Verein für Naturkunde in Kassel. In honor of his contributions to the study and classifications of diatoms, in 1864 Gottlob Ludwig Rabenhorst named the newly discovered Cocconeis wigandii after Dr. Wigand. In 1877, he was inducted into the German National Academy of Sciences Leopoldina, one of the highest honors that could be bestowed upon any German scientist. In January 1882 he was awarded with the Order of the Red Eagle, Fourth Class, for his services to science, and in 1885 he was named an honorary privy councilor.

From about 1873, Wigand had spent the better part of each autumn in Oberstdorf conducting personal research and preparing his writings, but on his return in October 1885, he began to feel unwell, which caused him to relinquish his teaching responsibilities through the summer of the following year. From march to October 1886, he was increasingly beset with seizures, until finally he died of cerebral inflammation on 22 October 1886.

== Organisms described by Wigand ==
=== Plants ===
- Ballota nigra var. ruderata Wigand, 1859
- Erigeron acris var. corymbosus (Wallr.) Wigand, 1859
- Galium aparine var. agreste Wigand, 1859
- Luzula campestris var. uliginosa (Wender.) Wigand, 1859
- Potamogeton natans var. serotinus Wigand, 1859
- Potamogeton pusillus var. latifolius Wigand, 1859
- Rosa canina f. sempervirens Wigand, 1859
- Rosa pomifera var. farinosa (Bechstein) Wigand, 1859
- Rumex nemolapathum var. conglomeratus (Murray) Wigand, 1859
- Stellaria glauca var. dilleniana Wigand, 1859
- Taraxacum officinale var. laciniatum Wigand, 1859
- Taraxacum officinale var. palustre (I. Lyons) Wigand, 1859
- Valeriana officinalis var. uliginosa (Wender.) Wigand, 1859
- Viola tricolor subsp. vulgaris Wigand, 1859
- Viola canina var. ruppii (All.) Wigand, 1859

=== Diatoms ===
- Biddulphia bifasciata Wigand, 1860
- Biddulphia transvera Wigand, 1860
- Biddulphia unifasciata Wigand, 1860
- Cocconeis radiata Wigand, 1860
- Himantidium dilatatum Wigand, 1860
- Himantidium striatum Wigand, 1860
- Odontella biddulphioides Wigand, 1860
- Synedra arcuata Wigand, 1860
- Tessella striata Wigand, 1860

=== Slime molds ===
- Arcyria ramulosa Wigand, 1863
- Arcyria serpula Wigand, 1863
- Trichia abietina Wigand, 1863
- Trichia furcata Wigand, 1863 is a synonym of Trichia decipiens (Pers.) T.Macbr., 1899
- Trichia obtusa Wigand, 1863

== Selected publications ==
=== Books ===
- Kritik und Geschichte der Lehre von der Metamorphose der Pflanze. Leipzig: Wilhelm Engelmann. 1846.
- Grundlegung der Pflanzen-Teratologie, oder Gesichtspuncte für die wissenschaftliche Betrachtung der Bildungsabweichungen im Pflanzenreiche. Marburg: Elwert. 1850.
- Intercellularsubstanz und Cuticula. Eine Untersuchung über das Wachsthum und die Metamorphose der vegetabilischen Zellenmembran. Braunschweig: Vieweg. 1850.
- Botanische Untersuchungen. Braunschweig: Vieweg. 1854.
- Der Baum. Betrachtungen über Gestalt und Lebensgeschichte der Holzgewächse. Braunschweig: Vieweg. 1854.
- Flora von Kurhessen und Nassau. Diagnostik der in Kurhessen und den angrenzenden Gebieten vorkommenden Gefässpflanzen einschliesslich der Nutz- und Zier-Gewächse. Vol. 1. Marburg: Elwert. 1859.
- Lehrbuch der Pharmakognosie. Ein pharmakognostischer Commentar zu sämmtlichen deutschen Pharmakopöen. Vol. 1. Berlin: August Hirschwald. 1863.
- Der botanische Garten zu Marburg. Vol. 1. Marburg: Elwert. 1868.
- Die Genealogie der Urzellen als Lösung des Descendenz-Problems. Oder die Entstehung der Arten ohne natürliche Zuchtwahl. Braunschweig: Vieweg. 1872.
- Über die Auflösung der Arten durch natürliche Zuchtwahl. Oder die Zukunft des organischen Reiches mit Rücksicht auf die Culturgeschichte. Hannover: Carl Rümpler. 1872.
- Mikroskopische Untersuchungen. Stuttgart: Maier. 1872.
- Der Darwinismus und die Naturforschung Newtons und Cuviers. Beiträge zur Methodik der Naturforschung und zur Speciesfrage. Vol. 1. Braunschweig: Vieweg. 1874.
- Lehrbuch der Pharmakognosie. Ein pharmakognostischer Commentar zu sämmtlichen deutschen Pharmakopöen. Vol. 2. Berlin: August Hirschwald. 1874.
- Flora von Kurhessen und Nassau. Diagnostischer Theil. Vol. 2. Cassel: Theodor Kay. 1875.
- Der Darwinismus und die Naturforschung Newtons und Cuviers. Beiträge zur Methodik der Naturforschung und zur Speciesfrage. Vol. 2. Braunschweig: Vieweg. 1876.
- Der Darwinismus und die Naturforschung Newtons und Cuviers. Beiträge zur Methodik der Naturforschung und zur Speciesfrage. Vol. 3. Braunschweig: Vieweg. 1877.
- Die alternative Teleologie oder Zufall vor der königlichen Akademie der Wissenschaften zu Berlin. Cassel: Theodor Kay. 1877.
- Übersicht der bisher in der Umgegend von Cassel beobachteten Pilze. Kassel: Theodor Kay. 1878. (with H. Eisenach and H. Riess)
- Flora von Kurhessen und Nassau. Anleitung zum Bestimmen der einheimischen Gefässpflanzen und der wichtigsten Culturgewächse nach natürlicher Methode. Vol. 3. Kassel: Theodor Kay. 1879.
- Lehrbuch der Pharmakognosie. Ein pharmakognostischer Commentar zu sämmtlichen deutschen Pharmakopöen. Vol. 3. Berlin: August Hirschwald. 1879.
- Der botanische Garten zu Marburg. Vol. 2. Marburg: Elwert. 1880.
- Entstehung und Fermentwirkung der Bakterien. Vorläufige Mittheilung. Vol. 1. Marburg: Elwert. 1884.
- Entstehung und Fermentwirkung der Bakterien. Vorläufige Mittheilung. Vol. 2. Marburg: Elwert. 1884.
- Lehrbuch der Pharmakognosie. Ein pharmakognostischer Commentar zu sämmtlichen deutschen Pharmakopöen. Vol. 4. Berlin: August Hirschwald. 1886.
- Das Protoplasma als Fermentorganismus. Marburg: Elwert. 1888. (with Eberhard Dennert)
- Die Kirche, ein Leib, eine naturwissenschaftlich-theologische Betrachtung über die Kirche. Gütersloh: Bertelsmann. 1898.

=== Articles ===
- "Zur Entwickelungsgeschichte der Farrnkräuter." Botan. Zeit. Berlin. 7 (2): 17‒26; 7 (3): 33‒40; 7 (4): 49‒54; 7 (5): 73‒80; 7 (6), 89‒97; 7 (7): 105‒116. 1849
- "Bemerkung über Nägeli's Versetzung der Florideen zu den Geschlechtspflanzen". Botan. Zeit. 7 (9). Berlin: 145–147. 1849.
- "Zur Antheridien-Frage". Botan. Zeit. 7 (46). Berlin: 809–820. 1849.
- "Sur le développement des Fougères". Ann. Sci. Nat. Bot. 11. Paris: 126–152. 1849.
- "Über die Oberfläche der Gewächse". Botan. Zeit. Halle. 8 (21): 409–417; 8 (22): 425–435. 1850.
- "Das Mikroskop und seine Anwendung, insbesondere für Pflanzen-Anatomie und Physiologie. Von Hermann Schacht, phil. Dr. Mit 6 lith. Tafeln. XIV u 198 S. Berlin, Reimer 1851." Bot. Zeit.Berlin. 9 (33): 583‒586; 9 (34): 597‒600; 9 (35), 617‒619. 1851.
- "Mittheilungen über einen neuen Apparat für mikroskopisches Zeichnen". Flora. 38 (44). Regensburg: 689. 1855.
- "Einige Beispiele anomaler Bildung des Holzkörpers". Flora. 39 (43). Regensburg: 673–681. 1856.
- "Beiträge zur Pflanzenteratologie". Flora. 39 (45). Regensburg: 705–719. 1856.
- "Biographisches Denkmal für Dr. J. H. Friedrich Wigand, Apotheker zu Treysa". Arch. Pharm. 85. Hannover: 209–215. 1856.
- "Über die feinste Structur der vegetabilischen Zellenmembran". SCHR. Ges. Beförd. Gesammten Naturw. 8. Marburg: 89–112. 1857.
- "Bunias orientalis". Amtl. Ber. Versammlung Deutscher Naturforscher Ärzte. 34. Calrsruhe: 114. 1859.
- "Über Injection der Holzgefässe". Amtl. Ber. Versammlung Deutscher Naturforscher Ärzte. 34. Carlsruhe: 114–115. 1859.
- "Über Pflanzengestaltungen". Amtl. Ber. Versammlung Deutscher Naturforscher Ärzte. 34. Carlsruhe: 115. 1859.
- "Über die Organisation der Trichiaceae". Amtl. Ber. Versammlung Deutscher Naturforscher Ärzte. 34. Carlsruhe: 119–121. 1859.
- "Über Überwallungserscheinungen". Amtl. Ber. Versammlung Deutscher Naturforscher Ärzte. 34. Carlsruhe: 124. 1859.
- "Über schraubel- und wickelartige Sprossketten". Amtl. Ber. Versammlung Deutscher Naturforscher Ärzte. 34. Carlsruhe: 129. 1859.
- "Bemerkungen über einige Diatomaceen". Hedwigia. 2 (8). Dresden: 41–46. 1860.
- "Beleuchtung von Schacht's Behandlung der Frage über die Intercellularsubstanz und die Cuticula." Flora. Regensburg. 44 (6): 81‒94; 44 (7): 97‒103. 1861.
- "Einige Sätze über die physiologische Bedeutung des Gerbstoffes und der Pflanzenfarbe". Botan. Zeit. 20 (16). Leipzig: 121–125. 1862.
- "Über das Verhalten der Zellenmembran zu den Pigmenten". Botan. Zeit. 20 (17). Leipzig: 129–135. 1862.
- "Über den Sitz der China-Alkaloide". Botan. Zeit. 20 (18). Leipzig: 137–143. 1862.
- "Über den Sitz Alkaloide in der Chinarinde". Arch. Pharm. 115. Hannover: 225–249. 1863.
- "H. Karsten, Entwickelungserscheinungen der organischen Zelle. Berlin 1863. Abdruck aus Poggendorff's Annalen, Band 118. 23 Seiten nebst einer lith. Tafel". Arch. Pharm. 115. Hannover: 190–192. 1863.
- "Über die Deorganisation der Pflanzenzelle; insbesondere über die physiologische Bedeutung von Gummi und Harz". Jahrb. Wissenschaftl. Bot. 3. Berlin: 115–182. 1863.
- "Zur Morphologie und Systematik der Gattungen Trichia und Arcyria". Jahrb. Wissenschaftl. Bot. 3. Berlin: 1–58. 1863.
- "A. W. Eichler, excursus morphologicus de formatione florum Gymnospermarum (v. Martius, flora brasiliensis, fasc. 34, p. 435‒449)". Flora. 46 (34). Regensburg: 529–536. 1863.
- "Die Delondre-Bouchardat'schen Chinarinden, von Ph. Phoebus. Giessen 1864, Rickertsche Buchhandlung. 75 Seiten mit einer Tabelle". Botan. Zeit. 23 (50). Leipzig: 39–41. 1865.
- "Magnoliaceae, Winteraceae, Ranunculaceae, Menispermaceae, Berberideae florae Brasiliensis. Exposuit A. G. Eichler, ph. Dr. (Aus Martius: Flora brasil. fasc. XXXVIII, 1864)". Botan. Zeit. 23 (51). Leipzig: 388–390. 1865.
- "Der botanische Garten in Marburg". Wochenschr. Ver. Beförd. Gartenbaues Königl. Preuss. Staates Gärtnerei Pflanzenk. 11 (2). Berlin: 24. 1868.
- "Nelumbium speciosum W.". Botan. Zeit. 29 (48). Leipzig: 813–826. 1871.
- "Der botanische Garten zu Marburg. Mit einem Plan". SCHR. Ges. Beförd. Gesammten Naturw. 9. Marburg: 49–68. 1872.
- "Über Darwin's Hypothese "Pangenesis"". SCHR. Ges. Beförd. Gesammten Naturw. 9. Marburg: 261–274. 1872.
- "Zur Verständigung über das "Hornprosenchym"". Flora. 60 (24). Regensburg: 369–384. 1877.
- "Das Gehirn Deutschlands." Beilage Allgem. Zeit. München. 296: 4365‒4367; 298: 4398‒4440; 299: 4414‒4415. 1878
- "Der Darwinismus ein Zeichen der Zeit". Zeitfragen des Christlichen Volkslebens. 3 (5–6). Heilbronn: Henninger: 1–122. 1878.
- "Studien über Protoplasma-Strömung in der Pflanzenzelle". Botan. Hefte. 1. Marburg: 168–224. 1885.
- †"Über Krystall-Plastiden". Botan. Hefte. 2. Marburg: 44–87. 1887.
- †"Bakterien innerhalb des geschlossenen Gewebes der knollenartigen Anschwellungen der Papilionaceen-Wurzeln". Botan. Hefte. 2. Marburg: 88–97. 1887.
- †"Beiträge zur Pflanzen-Teratologie". Botan. Hefte. 2. Marburg: 98–127. 1887.
- †"Die rothe und blaue Färbung von Laub und Frucht". Botan. Hefte. 2. Marburg: 218–243. 1887.
- †"Das Protoplasma als Fermentorganismus. Ein Beitrag zur Kenntnis der Bakterien, der Fäulnis, Gährung und Diastasewirkung, sowie der Molekularphysiologie". Botan. Hefte. 3. Marburg: 1–294. 1888.
- †"Der Individualismus in der Natur". Bücher Neueren Biol. Anthropol. 7. Habelschwerdt: Franke: 1–64. 1925.
