= Pierre-Alexandre Le Camus =

French politician (1774–1824)

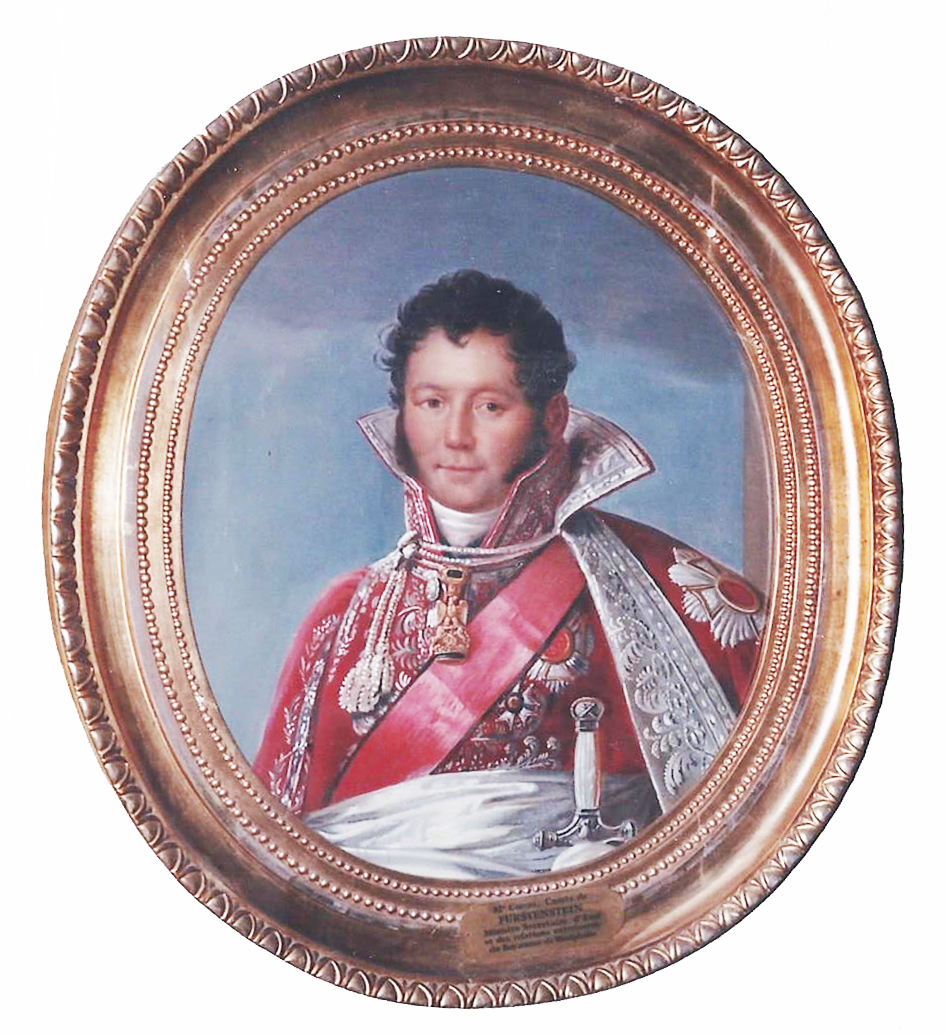
- Born: November 17, 1774; Martinique
- Died: November 13, 1824 (aged 49); Le Chesnay
- Resting place: Père Lachaise Cemetery
- Occupation: politician
- Title: comte de Fürstenstein
- Honours: Order of the Crown of Westphalia (1810) Order of the Seraphim (1810)

Pierre-Alexandre Le Camus, Count of Fürstenstein (17 November 1774 – 30 November 1824) was a French politician.

== Biography ==
Pierre-Alexandre Le Camus, a Creole from Martinique, met Jérôme Bonaparte around 1803 when the latter was forced to stay on the island because he was suffering from yellow fever.

Le Camus came to Europe with Jérôme in 1805 and remained his closest confidant. When Jérôme was made King of the newly created Kingdom of Westphalia for him by his brother in 1807, Le Camus became First Chamberlain, First Secretary and Grand Master of the Wardrobe. On 24 December 1807, Jérôme conferred on his favourite the hereditary great fief of the Diede zum Fürstenstein family with the castle and lordship of Fürstenstein (near Eschwege) and the lordship of Immichenhain as hereditary manorial fief, as well as an annual pension of 40,000 francs, and raised him to the rank of Count of Fürstenstein. Le Camus was thus the first subject to be raised to the rank of count by Jérôme. Emperor Napoleon was outraged and sent his brother an angry letter on 4 January 1808:

I see that you have the project of giving the title of Fürstenstein and an annuity of 40000 livres to Mr. Lecamus. I know of nothing more insane... What has Mr. Lecamus done? He has done no service to the country; he has done some to your person... Since I reigned, I have not conceived an act of such arbitrariness. I have more than ten men who saved my life, to whom I only pay 600 francs in pension. I have marshals who have won ten battles, who are covered with wounds and who do not have the reward that you are giving to Mr. Lecamus. It is therefore essential that you reverse this measure... (or else it is necessary) that Mr. Lecamus renounce the character of French citizen...

— Napoleon Bonaparte

Jérôme, who according to Napoleon's envoy Karl Friedrich Reinhard could do nothing, not even fall asleep, without Le Camus, chose the second option and continued to prefer his favourite. On 21 January 1808, he appointed Le Camus a councillor of state. On the same day, at the latter's request, he dismissed the previous Minister-Secretary of State, Johannes von Müller, who had only been appointed on 17 November 1807 (the latter became Director of Public Education instead), and on 26 February 1808 he made Le Camus Müller's successor. At the same time, Le Camus was provisionally and, from 1 October 1808, definitively entrusted with the kingdom's foreign affairs. Already on 15 April 1808, the fiefs of Fürstenstein, Immichenhain and Niddawitzhausen were transferred to the newly created Count of Fürstenstein as allodial property. He took over the coat of arms and livery of the Lords of Fürstenstein. Le Camus sold the lordship of Immichenhain on 11 August 1809 to Jérôme's court marshal, Baron Anne-François Louis Bertrand de Boucheporn.

Le Camus, who spoke no German and, to the amusement of those around him and himself, could only pronounce his title as Comte de "Furchentintin", was indisputably the first man in the kingdom after the royal couple and master of the royal trust. Not only did he retain his new title and property, but Napoleon even approved his appointment as Count of the Empire on 17 April 1812.

After Jérôme founded the Order of the Crown of Westphalia on 25 December 1809, Le Camus became the Order's first Grand Commander on 15 August 1810 (their total number was limited to 10) and also provisionally assumed the Order offices of Grand Chancellor and Treasurer and General Administrator responsible for the Order's income and expenditure.

Arthur Kleinschmidt wrote in his 1893 History of the Kingdom of Westphalia:

"Penetrating was his intellect, but his character ignoble; in spite of all intrigues he remained the favourite of the king, to whom, as Reinhard said, he was indispensable to sleep; he wasted time, did little evil and nothing good, and his own feeling of how little he could accomplish gave him a genteel reserve. Pleasant to be with, agreeable in love affairs, he was the man after Jerome's heart. He was looking for a brilliant match among the nobility of Westphalia."

With Jérôme's help, he succeeded in this too. On 12 June 1809 he married the Countess Adelaide von Hardenberg. For this purpose he separated from his previous mistress, Diana Rabe von Pappenheim, who then became Jérôme's mistress on his recommendation. His three beautiful sisters also married well. Claire Adélaïde Le Camus (1789–1874) married the French general and Westphalian war minister Joseph Antoine Morio (1771–1811) and, in her second marriage, the admiral Baron Victor Guy Duperré (1775–1846), with whom she had three children. Rose Claire Antoinette Le Camus (died 1854) married André-François Ocher de Beaupré (born 1776), who became General and in 1839 Inspecteur Général of Algeria, and with whom she had a daughter and a son. The third sister, whose name is not known, married the Director General of the Westphalian posts, Monsieur Pothuau, with whom she had a son, Louis Pierre Alexis Pothuau (Vice Admiral in 1871, Minister of the Navy in 1871–1873 and 1877–1879, Ambassador to London in 1879–1880).

His own marriage to Adelaide von Hardenberg produced two children: Adélaïde Marianne Lysinca Le Camus (born 10 January 1816) and Adolphe Charles Alexandre Le Camus (8 March 1818 – 20 May 1895). The King of Prussia later confirmed the title of Counts of Fürstenstein to their children.

After the end of Napoleonic rule, Le Camus lived in France. He died on 30 November 1824 at Grand Chesnay Castle in Le Chesnay, near Versailles. He was buried in the Père Lachaise cemetery in Paris; his remains were transferred to the ossuary there in 2001.

== Titles ==
- Count of Fürstenstein (14 December 1807, by decree of Jerome Bonaparte, King of Westphalia);
- Count of Fürstenstein and of the Empire (letters patent of 17 April 1812):

The title of Count of Fürstenstein (named after the castle of Fürstenstein, was confirmed on a personal basis on 27 January 1840, and then by a decree of the King of Prussia on 30 August 1864.

== Distinctions ==
Kingdom of Westphalia

- Knight of the Order of the Crown of Westphalia (24 January 1810);
- Provisionally acting as Grand Chancellor of the Order of the Crown of Westphalia (5 February 1810);
- Commander of the Order of the Crown of Westphalia (15 February 1810);
- Grand Commander of the Order of the Crown of Westphalia (15 August 1810);

Kingdom of Bavaria

- Ordre de Saint-Hubert (Bavière);

Kingdom of Denmark

- Ordre de l'Éléphant;

Kingdom of the Netherlands

- Grand cordon de l'ordre royal de Hollande;

Kingdom of Prussia

- Ordre de l'Aigle noir;

Kingdom of Sweden

- Ordre des Séraphins;

Kingdom of Württemberg

- Grand Cross of the Order of Civil Merit (Württemberg), by 3 October 1807;
- Order of the Golden Eagle (3 October 1807).
