= Diana Rabe von Pappenheim =

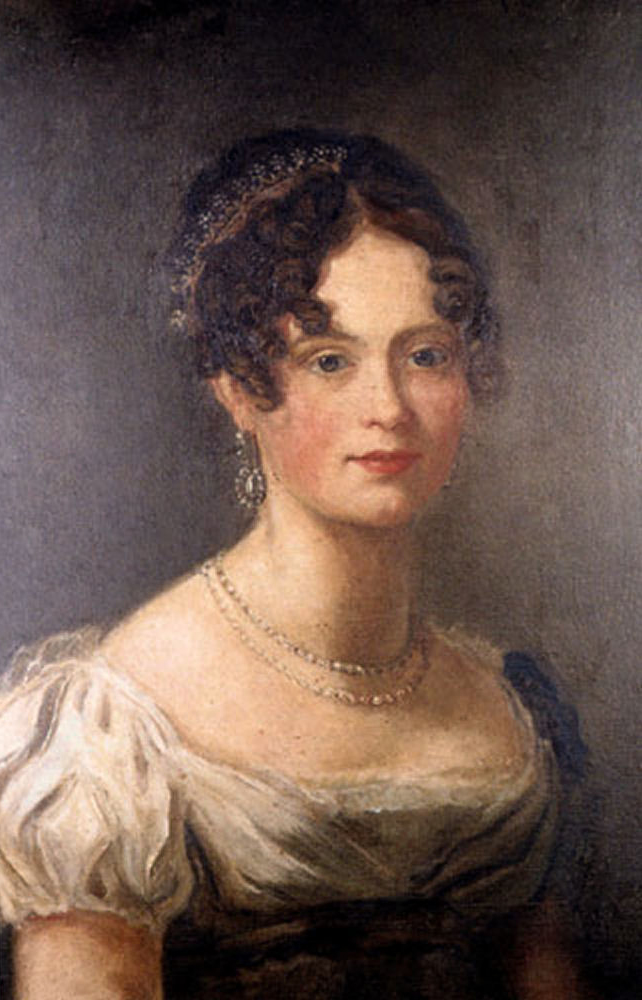
- Born: Diane de Waldner de Freundstein; January 25, 1788; Château Ollwiller, Wuenheim, Alsace, France
- Died: December 18, 1844 (aged 56)
- Spouses: Wilhelm Maximilian Rabe von Pappenheim (1806-1815); Ernst Christian August von Gersdorff (1816-1844)

Diana Rabe von Pappenheim (née Freiin Waldner von Freundstein; 25 January 1788–18 December 1844) was the royal mistress of Jérôme Bonaparte, King of Westphalia, from 1810 until 1813, by whom she most likely had a daughter in 1811.

== Early life ==
Diana was born at Château Ollwiller in Wuenheim, Alsace, France, to Baron Gottfried Waldner von Freundstein and his wife, Friederike (von Stein zu Nord-und Ostheim). Her father, the son of Count Franz Ludwig Waldner von Freundstein (1710–1788) and his wife, Wilhelmine Auguste Sophie Eleonore (von Berckheim zu Rappoltsweiler), was a member of the General Council of the Upper Rhine knighthood and the imperial knights in the Ortenau and the Wetterau. Her mother was the daughter of Baron Dietrich Philipp August von Stein zu Nord-und Ostheim (1741–1803) and his wife, Maria Susanne Wilhelmine Elisabeth (von und zu der Thann). Her aunt, Henriette Louise de Waldner de Freundstein, Baronne d'Oberkirch, was the author of a series of Mémoires about court society.

Diana grew up with two brothers Eduard (1786–1864) and Theodor (1789–1880), and three sisters Isabelle, Cecile, and Adele. Her eldest brother Eduard Waldner von Freundstein (Edouard de Waldner Freundstein) later served in Napoleon III's imperial French army, then became a senator of the Second French Empire.

As a result of the French Revolution, the family lost most of their possessions and income. To ensure their future financial security, their parents decided to find positions for their daughters as ladies' maids in noble houses after they had reached an appropriate age. Diana and her sister Isabelle went to Kassel in 1802, then to Weimar two years later. Isabelle was lady-in-waiting to the Landgravine Louise of Hesse-Darmstadt, while the now 16-year-old Diana served the Grand Duchess Maria Pavlovna of Russia.

== First marriage ==
In Weimar, the pretty and vivacious Diana met chamberlain Wilhelm Maximilian Rabe von Pappenheim (1764–1815), who was more than 20 years her senior. They fell in love and married in 1806, and a year later their son Gottfried was born. By 1808, Diana was expecting her second child; in the meantime, Napoleon had created the Kingdom of Westphalia for his youngest brother Jérôme, who declared that citizens currently living outside Westphalia had to return to the country under penalty of confiscation of their goods, and that the gentry must present themselves at his court. Diana and Wilhelm returned to Kassel.

Shortly after the birth of her second son Alfred in September 1808, the couple took up places in the royal court: Diana as lady-in-waiting to Queen Catharina, Wilhelm as chamberlain to Jérôme. Their marriage became strained, not only due to their significant difference in age, but also because William suffered from a nervous disorder stemming from his years in the Hessian military. While her husband spent his time at various health spas, and her two sons Gottfried and Alfred stayed with a retired priest in the Harz mountains, Diana enjoyed life at the court of "King Funny". She apparently had an especially close relationship with one of Jérôme's favourites, Pierre-Alexandre Le Camus, and was reportedly his mistress. In August 1809, the Parisian ambassador in Kassel, Karl Friedrich Reinhard, reported that Pierre had separated from Diana due to his marriage to the Countess Adelheid von Hardenberg.

== Mistress of the king ==
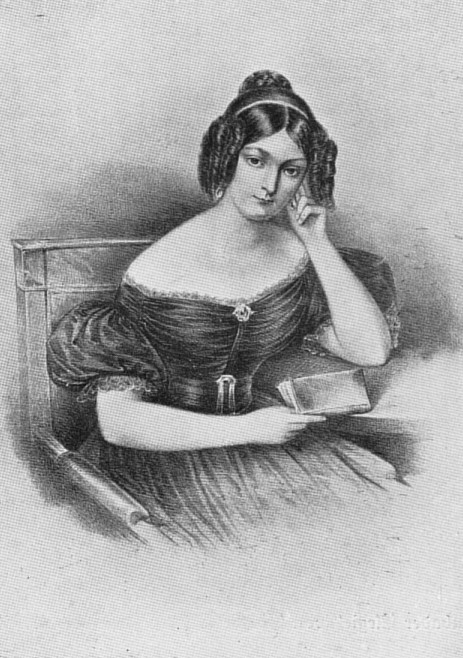
Diana's first daughter Jenny von Gustedt

Pierre had raved of Diana's charms to the king, which awakened Jérôme's interest; his advances were initially resisted, as Reinhard pointedly noted in a letter dated 10 August 1809. However, in March 1810 Diana travelled with the royal couple to Paris for Napoleon's wedding to Archduchess Marie Louise of Austria. Her husband did not attend. On 7 September 1811, Diana gave birth to a daughter, Jeromée Catharina. Jérôme himself held her at her baptism, but because their marriage still stood, Wilhelm Rabe von Pappenheim acknowledged her as his own legitimate daughter. Known better as Jenny von Gustedt, she would later become the grandmother of the women's rights activist and writer Lily Braun (1865–1916).

Barely three months later, on 30 November 1811, Wilhelm was raised to the rank of Count in the Westphalian court, most likely done in response to the birth of the daughter, who was most likely the king's illegitimate offspring. This helped him become the First Chamberlain and Master of Ceremonies, but he could not cope with the public and scandalous breakup of his marriage following the revelation of Diana's affair with Jérôme. He withdrew more and more from the court, fell into a spiraling depression and finally collapsed. After an unsuccessful treatment at the Pitié-Salpêtrière Hospital, a Paris hospital for the mentally ill, he returned to his home at Schloss Stammen and died two years later, on 3 January 1815.

It is not known where Diana was living during this period, but she was certainly still enjoying Jérôme's attentions. On 4 October 1813, in the last days of the Kingdom of Westphalia (Kassel having been taken on 1 October by the Russian general Tschernyschow), she gave birth to another daughter at Schloss Schönfeld in Kassel. The child, named Marie Pauline von Schönfeld after her birthplace, was secretly taken to the monastery of Notre Dame des Oiseaux in Paris; she was brought up there as well as with Diana's relatives in Alsace. In 1832, Marie Pauline became a nun at the same monastery, taking on the name Marie de la Croix, and had become superior of the convent when she died in 1873.

== Second marriage ==
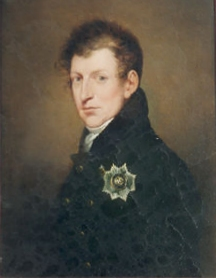
Diana's second husband Ernst Christian August von Gersdorff in 1829

After her husband's death in 1815, Diana took her daughter Jenny back to Weimar, where her sister Isabelle had married the General, Count August Karl von und zu Egloffstein. Since the Grand Duchess Maria Pavlovna, whom she had previously served as lady-in-waiting, welcomed her back with open arms, her position in Weimar society was secured. In the autumn of 1815, she met the widowed diplomat and later Minister of State Ernst Christian August von Gersdorff (1781–1852), who had been a part of the Sachsen-Weimar-Eisenach delegation to the Congress of Vienna and had just returned to Weimar. The two married on 20 January 1816; the marriage lasted 28 years and seems to have been happy. Ernst took Diana's daughter Jenny as well as her two sons Gottfried and Alfred Rabe von Pappenheim as comrades of his own son Karl from his first marriage to Amalie von Damnitz. In 1821, their daughter Cécile was born. Diana devoted herself entirely to their large family.

== Illness and death ==
She suffered from a chronic and deteriorating bilious complaint, and therefore in 1830 she sought out a fountain cure in Karlsbad or Bad Kissingen. The disease began to worsen considerably in the 1840s, but an operation to treat it sent her into a decline. She died on 18 December 1844, aged 56 years.

Her life and those of others in the court was later used as material for a book by her daughter Jenny, Memoiren um die Titanen (Memoirs of the Titans).
