= Vidovicia =

Scientific classification
- Kingdom: Animalia
- Phylum: Mollusca
- Class: Gastropoda
- Order: Stylommatophora
- Family: Helicidae
- Genus: Vidovicia; Brusina, 1904
- Species: V. caerulans

Binomial name
- Vidovicia caerulans (C. Pfeiffer, 1828)

Genus of molluscs

Vidovicia is a monotypic genus of gastropods belonging to the family Helicidae. The only species is Vidovicia caerulans.

The species is found in Southern Europe.
