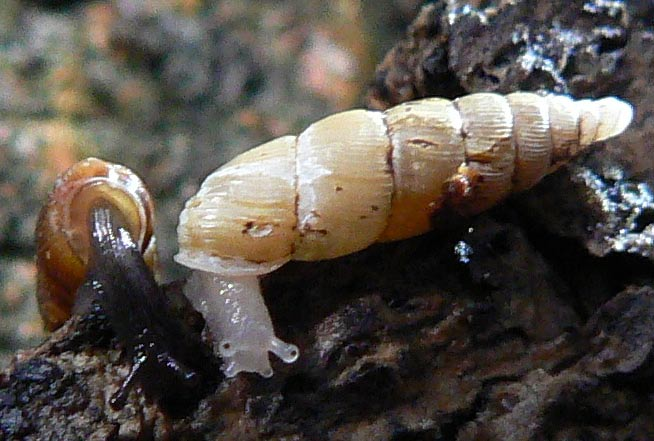
- Common and albinistic colour forms of Pseudofusulus varians

Scientific classification
- Kingdom: Animalia
- Phylum: Mollusca
- Class: Gastropoda
- Order: Stylommatophora
- Family: Clausiliidae
- Subfamily: Clausiliinae
- Tribe: Clausiliini
- Genus: Pseudofusulus; Nordsieck, 1977
- Species: P. varians

Binomial name
- Pseudofusulus varians (C. Pfeiffer, 1828)

Synonyms
- Helix (Clausilia) diaphana C. Pfeiffer, 1828; Helix (Clausilia) varians C. Pfeiffer, 1828

= Pseudofusulus =

Species of gastropod

Pseudofusulus varians is a species of air-breathing land snail, a terrestrial pulmonate gastropod mollusk in the family Clausiliidae.

Genus Pseudofusulus is monotypic genus (contains one species only) with Pseudofusulus varians as its type species.

It is a relict species from Atlantic period of the Holocene, inhabiting exclusively nature beech and scree forests in Europe.

== Distribution ==
The distribution of this species is Eastern Alpine and Western Carpathian. The type locality is the High Alps in Styria, Austria.

The key area of its range is in the Western Alps (from the south-western part of the Alps to Croatia, and also to the Dolomites in the southern Tyrol).

- Austria
- Germany
- Czech Republic – 7 confirmed sites in Ore Mountains in Bohemia, locally extinct in Moravia. Already Vojen Ložek has been calling for the effective conservation of this species in the 1980s. It is one of the most endangered species in the Czech Republic, restricted to hidden and undisturbed natural deciduous forests. Originally it was known from 16 sites in the Ore Mountains (Krušné Hory Mts.), in the northwestern Bohemia, Czech Republic and one site on the slope of Smrk Mount in the Moravian-Silesian Beskids (Moravskoslezské Beskydy Mts.), East Moravia, Czech Republic.
  - extinct in Moravia: The forest at the only (but well populated) locality in the Moravia has been seriously damaged by air pollution from factories (such as Třinec Iron and Steel Works and others) jointly with the 20 °C dropping of temperatures in inversion on 31 December 1978. The nearly all pollution-damaged stand died out at the southwestern slope on the Smrk Mount.
  - in Bohemia: The occurrence of the snail was recently confirmed only at seven sites in the Krušné Hory Mts. Remaining sites were destroyed due to human impacts, mainly acid rains and insensitive forest management mainly due to removal of dead wood and clearcutting. Therefore, its populations survived only in forest patches hidden in hardly accessible places.
- Slovakia – in the eastern part of Low Tatras, in the peak level of Poľana, Klenovský Vepor Mount in the Vepor Mountains, Muránska planina and the Ondrejsko in Slovak Paradise is the easternmost. All of these records in the Slovakia are coming from 1960s–1970s and there has been no verification since.
- Croatia
- Italy
- and others

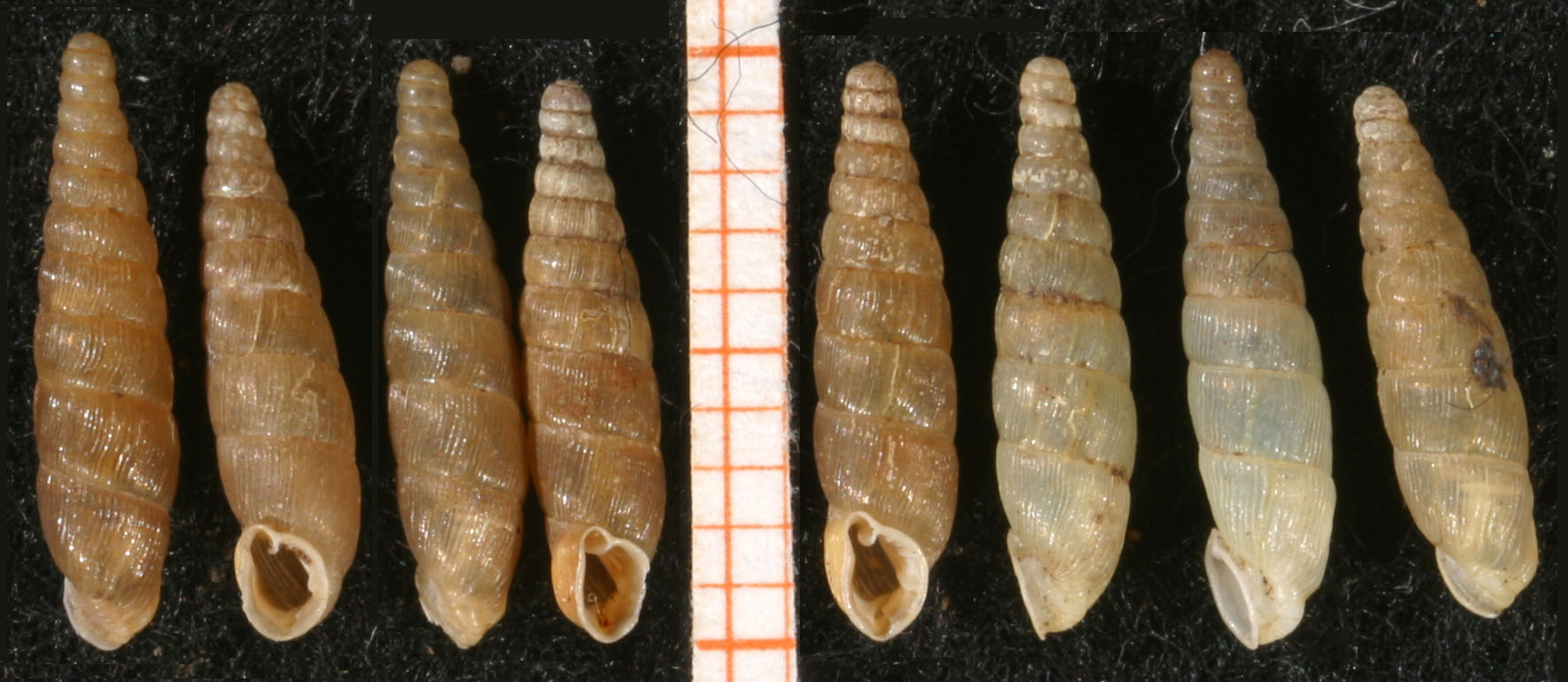
shells of Pseudofusulus varians

== Description ==
The shell is horny or greenish brown and finely ribbed. The shell has 9–10 whorls. The apertural margin is detached. Columellaris is deep inside and forked, hardly visible in a perpendicular view. Palatal wall is white and prominent. There is no lunula. Subcolumellaris is very close to basal furrow, visible in an oblique view. Clausilium is not very concave.

The width of the shell is 2.2–3 mm. The height of the shell is 9–12 mm.

== Habitat ==
Pseudofusulus varians is very exacting on the quality of its environment and its populations are small and quite scattered in the whole of its range.

It lives in virgin-like forests and old-growth forest with fallen dead wood (coarse woody debris) in montane and submontane. It is found in humid and shady habitats in woods, under ground litter and stones, in mountains. In the Czech Republic it is strictly associated with trees, restricted to undisturbed and hardly accessible natural beech forests. Pseudofusulus varians is strictly dendrophilous species, so the main threat is dead wood removing and clearcutting.

As it is endangered in the whole Europe, it is very important to protect its modern sites.
