= Franz Georg Pfeiffer =

19th-century German politician

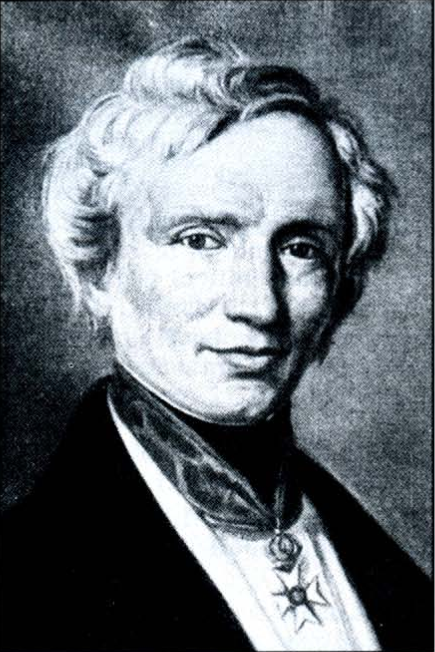
- Born: 11 January 1784; Marburg, Landgraviate of Hesse-Cassel, Holy Roman Empire
- Died: 15 April 1856 (aged 71); Cassel, Electorate of Hesse
- Education: University of Marburg
- Spouse: Susanne "Susette" Friederike Lagisse (m. 1809)
- Relatives: Johann Jakob Pfeiffer (father); Burkhard Wilhelm Pfeiffer, Carl Jonas Pfeiffer (brothers); Louis Pfeiffer (nephew)
- Awards: See below

Franz Georg Pfeiffer (11 January 1784 – 15 April 1856) was a German legal scholar and politician.

== Early life ==
Franz Georg Pfeiffer was son of the reformed preacher, University of Marburg theology professor and Councilor of the Consistory Johann Jakob Pfeiffer and his wife, Luise Rebecke Rüppel. He and his brother Christian Hartmann Pfeiffer were identical twins, and their birth was so stressful on their mother that it led to her death shortly thereafter. Contemporary sources describe not only their identical appearance, but also their identical handwriting and mannerisms, which allowed them to play tricks on their friends and family from an early age. One anecdote even says that the brothers were so similar that their wives could sometimes not tell them apart. This penchant for mischief would follow them throughout their lives. The twins grew up in Marburg, and eventually both attended their father's alma mater and employer, the University of Marburg, where they studied law and graduated in 1803. The next year, he was appointed a prosecutor for the government of the City of Marburg but by 1808, Pfeiffer had relocated to Cassel.

== Marriage and family ==
On January 12, 1809, Franz Pfeiffer married Susanne (Susette) Friederike (née Lagisse, 6 April 1787 – 23 May 1861), the daughter of the secretary of the National Board of Trade in Cassel, Jean-François Lagisse (31 May 1741 – 2 January 1809) and his wife Marie-Pauline Collignon (9 May 1758 – 10 May 1851). The Lagisse and Collignon families were originally French-speaking Huguenots who fled to Switzerland and Amsterdam, respectively, before meeting in Cassel. They had four children

- Pauline Sophie Christiane Marie (11 December 1809 – 17 January 1872), married to Arnold Wehner, Director of Music at the University of Göttingen.
- Wilhelm Carl (13 June 1811 – 7 May 1855)
- Friedrich Moritz Christian (22 July 1815 – 12 April 1879), lawyer and politician in Cassel, then in Bremen; Erfurt Union representative.
- Theodor Karl Georg (12 October 1819 – 5 January 1893), doctor of medicine and proprietor of the Cold-water cure resort at Alexandersbad.

== Political career ==
In 1806, under Westphalian rule, he was made procurator fisci, and in 1810 procureur du roi (crown prosecutor) in Cassel. Pfeiffer and his twin brother, Christian, published Bulletin des Lois et des décrets du royaume de Westphalie from 1808 to 1813, which catalogued and explained the laws and regulations that had been put into place during the short-lived Westphalian Kingdom. In 1814, with the return of the Electorate of Hesse, Pfeiffer was named to the High Court in Cassel and by 1817 he was appointed a Hofgerichtsrat (government councillor) and member of the Ober-Rentkammer (Council of the Treasury). Between 1821 and 1831 he held the position of Regierungsrat (senior government councillor) and Polizeidirector (director of the police) in Kassel, and in 1831 he was promoted to Director of the Police for the Hessian Interior Ministry, and appointed to the Hessian geheime Regierungsrat (privy council). In 1837, he was named Director of the Consistory, and from 1841 to 1844 he held the position of Director of the Landskreditkasse (National Credit Union) in Cassel. In 1844 Franz Pfeiffer fell gravely ill with a nervous fever, which killed his twin brother and almost killed him. Having only just recovered, in 1846 he was made Chief of the Governmental Deputation in Rinteln, a posting which he saw as a personal slight against him by the Elector, Wilhelm II, Elector of Hesse. In letters to his brothers in Cassel, Franz speculated that his apparent banishment was the result of a land dispute, wherein Franz and his late brother Christian built their home on a part of Wilhelmshöhe Tor that the Elector wanted for himself. Whether this was true or not, upon Wilhelm II's death, Franz was recalled to Cassel by his son and successor, Frederick William, who appointed him Ober-Zolldirector (chief customs officer) in 1847. As of 1848, Franz Pfeiffer was a Director of the Board of Tax Officers in Kassel, a Member of the Board of Trade, a member of the State Commission for Hospitals and Relief of the Poor, Sovereign Commissioner of the Althessische Ritterschaft, and Director of the Agricultural Examination Board, the Reformed Orphanage Board, and the Fire Insurance Board. At the same time, Pfeiffer also acted as the Electoral Hessian plenipotentiary in certain delicate negotiations around border disputes between the Electorate of Hesse, the Kingdom of Prussia, the Grand duchies of Saxe-Weimar-Eisenach and Saxe-Meiningen and the Principality of Waldeck and Pyrmont. For his assistance in evading a political crisis, he was decorated with chivalric orders by several of the states involved.

From July 1849 to February 1850, Pfeiffer was the plenipotentiary representative of the Electorate of Hesse to the newly restored parliament of the German Confederation, and in March 1850, Pfeiffer was appointed to the Erfurt parliament. Shortly thereafter, whether through fault of his own, or through his relation to his brother Burkhard, Pfeiffer was removed from his position by Ludwig Hassenpflug, and returned to his home in Cassel, where he lived out the remainder of his life.

== Awards and honors ==
- Knight of the Order of the Crown of Westphalia (Westphalia)
- Knight of the Order of the Red Eagle, 3rd Class (Prussia)
- Grand Cross of the Order of the White Falcon, 2nd Class (Saxe-Weimar-Eisenach)
- Grand Cross of the Saxe-Ernestine House Order, 3rd Class (Saxe-Meiningen)
