= Franz Richarz =

German physicist (1860–1920)

Franz Richarz (15 October 1860, in Endenich – 10 June 1920, in Marburg) was a German physicist. His father, also named Franz Richarz (1812–1887), was a noted psychiatrist.

He studied mathematics and physics at the universities of Berlin and Bonn, receiving his doctorate in 1884 with the dissertation Bildung von Ozon, Wasserstoffsuperoxyd und Ueberschwefelsäure bei der Electrolyse verdünnter Schwefelsäure ("The formation of ozone, hydrogen peroxide and sulfuric acid during the electrolysis of dilute sulfuric acid"). In 1888 he obtained his habilitation and worked as a lecturer of physics at the University of Bonn. In 1895 he succeeded Anton Oberbeck as professor of physics at the University of Greifswald, where he also served as director of the Physics Institute. In 1901 he relocated as a professor to the University of Marburg. In 1907 he became a member of the Deutsche Akademie der Naturforscher Leopoldina.

With Otto Krigar-Menzel, he conducted a series of experiments for determination of the gravitational constant and the Earth's mean density.

== Selected works ==
- Bestimmung der Gravitationsconstante und der mittleren Dichtigkeit der Erde durch Wägungen, 1898 – Determination of the gravitational constant and the mean density of the earth by way of weighing.
- Neuere fortschritte auf dem gebiete der elektrizität, 1899; Recent advances in the field of electricity.
- Ueber Temperaturänderungen in Künstlich auf- und Abbewegter Luft, 1902.
- Vorlesungen über Theorie der Wärme (as editor; 1903) – Hermann Helmholtz' lectures on the theory of heat.
- Zur Erinnerung an Paul Drude zwei Ansprachen (with Walter König, 1906); In memory of Paul Drude; two speeches.
- Anfangsgründe der Maxwellschen Theorie verknüpft mit der Elektronentheorie, 1909 – The rudiments of Maxwell's theory combined with the electron theory.
