= Friedrichsgymnasium Kassel =

Coordinates: 51.31°N 9.4883°E

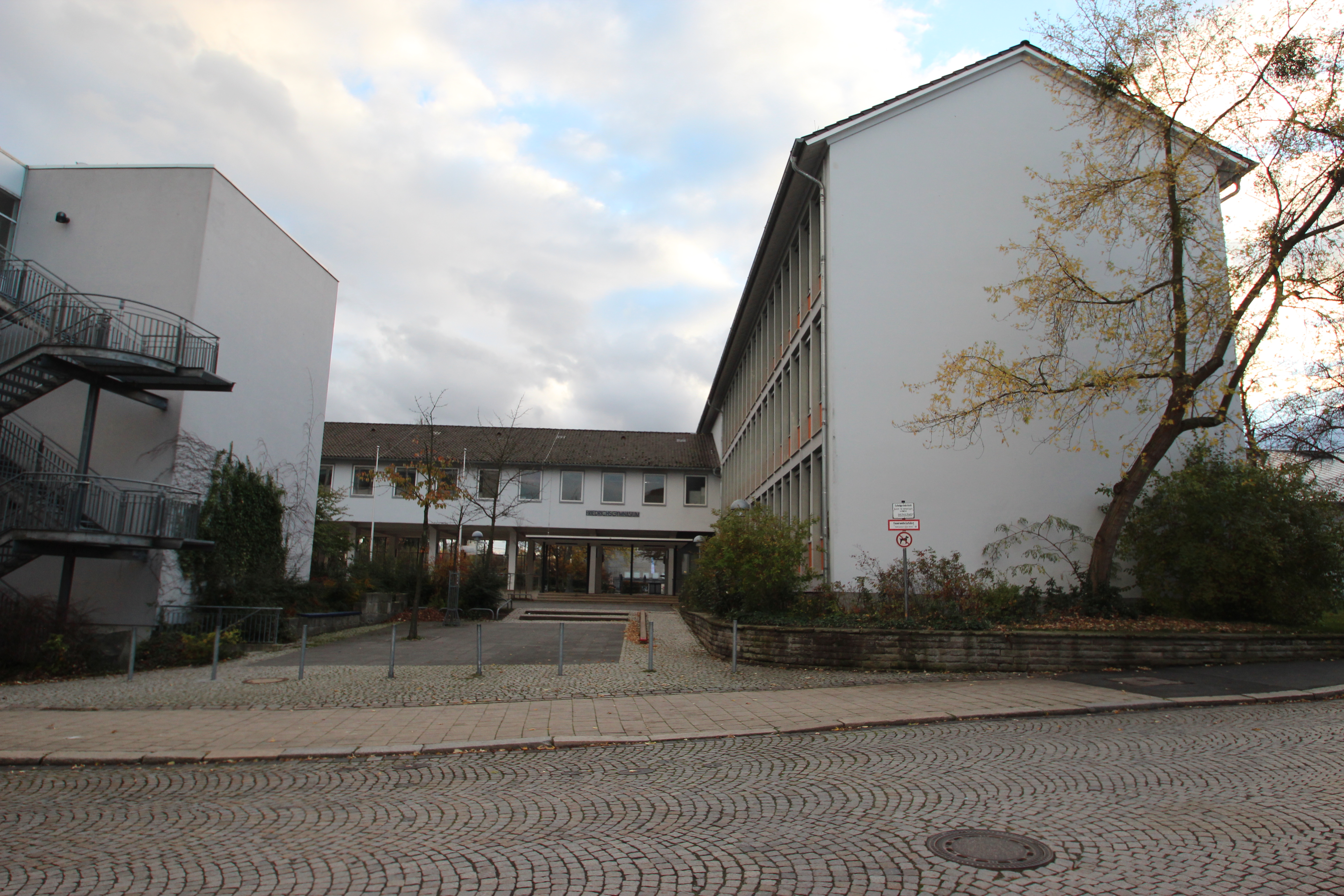

Information
- Former name: Lyceum Fridericianum
- Established: 1779; 246 years ago

The Friedrichsgymnasium is a humanistic classical gymnasium, located in Kassel, Hesse, Germany, that focuses on music and foreign languages, particularly Latin and Ancient Greek. The mission statement of the school is to spread the ideas of humanism and tolerance and to ensure the students grow up to become independent, educated and responsible, following the school motto "Learn what you are and be such", a quote by the Ancient Greek poet Pindar. The school is a so-called "Gymnasium", a secondary school that offers the highest possible standards in education and aimes for the students to take their A-Levels, the "Abitur", in year 13. The school specializes in supporting highly gifted students and has a tradition of encouraging students to be competitive and exceed their limits. However, the school also highlights the importance of tolerance and solidarity, taking part in projects with hospitals and refugee organisations.

== History ==
The Friedrichsgymnasium was founded in 1779 as Lyceum Fridericianum by Landgrave Friedrich II, under the directorship of Johann Jakob Pfeiffer. It is the oldest gymnasium in Kassel. The school is known to foster its history and is proud of its status of being the alma mater of the two most influential 19th century German linguists, Jacob and Wilhelm Grimm, and the early 20th century German ruler, Kaiser Wilhelm II.

== Foreign languages ==
The first foreign languages taught are Latin and English starting in 5th grade. Starting in 8th grade, pupils can also select to take French or Ancient Greek. In 10th grade, Italian is offered as another option.

== Extracurricular activities ==
The school offers a broad range of extracurricular activities, from literature and drama clubs to various science camps, for example an astronomy club. Furthermore, the school offers exchange programs to Saint-Paul-Trois-Châteaux, France, Novy Urengoy in Siberia, Tel Aviv, Israel and Ierapetra on the island of Crete.

=== Student Politics ===
The Friedrichsgymnasium has engaged in various international youth events and organizes numerous political projects. Since 2018, pupils in the top classes of the Friedrichsgymnasium have participated regularly in the festivities to commemorate the end of World War I. Multiple pupils of the school have given speeches in the Bundestag, collaborated with other European schools and youth teams from large football clubs, such as Southampton F.C., and presented the results of this work to both German president Frank-Walter Steinmeier and French president Emmanuel Macron. Politicians that have recently visited the school include Wolfgang Schäuble and Claudia Roth. The school also regularly sends a delegation to the annual Berlin Model United Nations Conference BERMUN at John F Kennedy School in Berlin.

=== Music ===
One of the school's main two academic focus points is music. The school boasts several orchestras, bands, choirs and music clubs and a number of concerts are held to celebrate important events in the school year, for example the start of the Christmas holidays or the end of the A-Level exams. Each year, the different musical societies of the school partake in multiple excursions and trips, traditionally to cities with a rich musical history, such as Vienna.

=== Rowing ===
The RVFG, the school's rowing club, is one of the most popular activities offered, regularly and successfully competing in competitions at the local, state and national levels. The school owns a club house on the Fulda (river) which also is used for numerous events and festivities throughout the school year. Traditionally, one or two older pupils will coach a group of younger ones, with teachers and parents only acting as organizers and donors.

== Notable alumni ==
- The Brothers Grimm - Fairy and Folk tale authors and collectors
- Wilhelm II - German Kaiser during World War I
- Michael Stürmer - German historian and political advisor
- Peter Eisenberg - German linguist
- Eva Kühne-Hörmann - German politician
- Adam von Trott zu Solz - Anti-Nazi conspirator
