= Burkhard Wilhelm Pfeiffer =

German judge and politician (1777–1852)

Burkhard Wilhelm Pfeiffer Dr. jur.
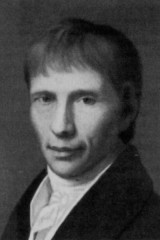
- Born: July 5, 1777; Cassel, Landgraviate of Hesse-Cassel, Holy Roman Empire
- Died: April 10, 1852 (aged 74); Cassel, Electorate of Hesse, German Confederation
- Other names: Burchard Wilhelm Pfeiffer, Burchhardt Wilhelm Pfeiffer, Burghard Wilhelm Pfeiffer
- Education: University of Marburg
- Occupations: Lawyer, Jurist, Politician
- Years active: 1799-1852
- Spouse: Louise Susanne Arnoldine Harnier (m. 1801–1847)
- Relatives: Johann Jakob Pfeiffer (father); Carl Jonas Pfeiffer, Franz Georg Pfeiffer (brothers); Louis Pfeiffer (son)
- Awards: Knight, Order of the Crown of Westphalia; Commander, 2nd Class, House Order of the Golden Lion

Burkhard Wilhelm Pfeiffer (7 May 1777 – 4 October 1852) was a German jurist and liberal politician. He is best remembered to students of German legal history as the author of Praktische Ausführungen aus allen Teilen der Rechtswissenschaften, Mit Erkenntnissen des Oberappellationsgerichts zu Kassel or "Practical Explanations from all Parts of Jurisprudence, with Findings of the High Court of Appeal in Kassel," and for his years-long rivalry with the Hessian prime minister Ludwig Hassenpflug.

== Early life and career ==
Pfeiffer was the son of the evangelical preacher, theologian, and University of Marburg professor Johann Jakob Pfeiffer and his first wife Lucie Rebecke (née Rüppel). Among his siblings were Franz Georg Pfeiffer and Carl Jonas Pfeiffer. Pfeiffer grew up in Kassel, where his father served as the parish priest in evangelical parish of Oberneustadt, and Burkhard was training to follow in his footsteps and become a preacher. After about a year at the University of Marburg, his father died, and he subsequently transferred to the faculty of Politics and Jurisprudence in 1792. It was here that Pfeiffer became acquainted with Friedrich Carl von Savigny, who would remain a friend for decades. Pfeiffer received his doctorate in law from the university in 1798, and was quickly made an archivist for the Hessian government, a position he held until 1803. From 1803 to 1805 he was a public prosecutor, but in 1805 he was again appointed as state archivist. In addition to his duties as archivist, he was also named procurator fiscal to the court of William I, Elector of Hesse. This position lasted until the invasion of Hesse by Napoleon and its annexation into the Kingdom of Westphalia. Under the rule of King Jérôme, Pfeiffer worked as the Assistant Procurator General for the Court of Appeals in Cassel, and for his service, was awarded the Order of the Crown of Westphalia. During this time, Pfeiffer also published extensively, on subjects as varied as Roman law, patrimony and jurisdiction, civil code, and the Westphalian constitution.

=== "Exile" from Kassel ===
It was during this period of intense publication that Pfeiffer and von Savigny fell out over politics, with Pfeiffer’s liberal views placing him at odds with Savigny as they worked with Thibaut to help reform and restructure the outdated laws and civil codes that plagued all of the German states at this time. After the defeat of Napoleon and the reestablishment of the Electorate of Hesse, Pfeiffer again took offices as a government councilor and legal advisor. In 1817, he was made a senior appellate judge at the Electoral Court of Appeals in Hesse, whose law-code he revised from its previous 1771 version. He was offered a position on the court of appeals in Berlin, but his attachment to his homeland saw him decline the offer. In 1820, Pfeiffer came into direct conflict with the Elector William, over an expert opinion drawn up to the disadvantage of the Elector on the legality of debt repayments to the war chest during the Napoleonic period. This decision, and the subsequent backlash from the court, prompted him to leave his position, move to Lübeck, and take up a position on the newly formed Oberappellationsgericht der vier Freien Städte, or “High Court of Appeal of the Four Free Cities,” which held jurisdiction over the free imperial cities of Lübeck, Bremen, Frankfurt and Hamburg.

=== Return to Kassel ===
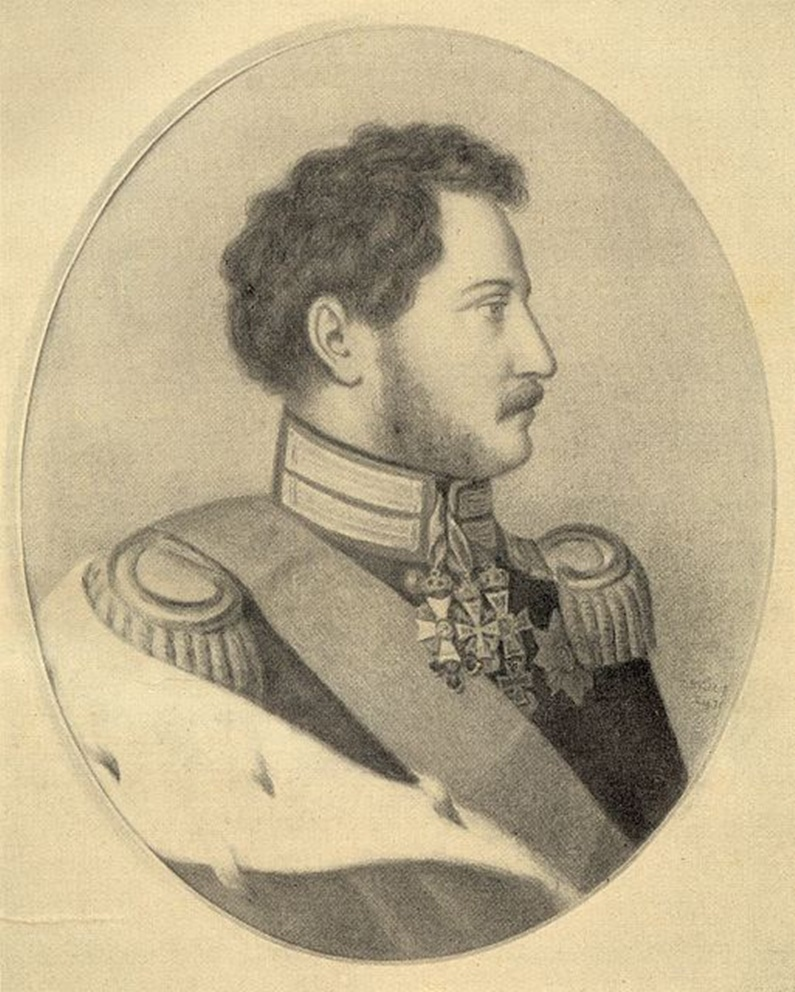
Pfeiffer's patron, William II, Elector of Hesse

William I, Elector of Hesse died in 1821, and Pfeiffer was quickly summoned back to court by the new Elector, William II. Among his duties at court was to oversee the legal and political education of William’s son Frederick William, who would go on to be the third and final Elector of Hesse. in 1824, Pfeiffer received an offer from Karl August, Grand Duke of Saxe-Weimar-Eisenach to take up a teaching position at the University of Jena, as well as a senior role in the court of appeals there, but yet again, he declined the offer. In a letter to his son, he recorded his internal turmoil: "Even if there are many, many things I would wish otherwise, it would not be any better if I selfishly avoided them. I would also have to recognize myself guilty of ingratitude against the prince to whom I owe my honorable return to my sorely missed fatherland, if I wanted to leave it again without any cause for displeasure with my situation here." (Note: "Ist auch hier manches, vieles, was ich anders wünschte: besser wird es doch nicht, wenn ich ihm egoistisch ans dem Wege gehe. Auch müßte ich mich selbst des Undanks gegen den Fürsten schuldig erkennen, dem ich die ehrenvolle Rückkehr in mein überall schmerzlich vermißtes Vaterland verdanke, wenn ich ohne alle Veranlassung zum Mißvergnügen mit meiner hiesigen Lage dieselbe schon wieder verlassen wollte.") Despite his high position at court, Pfeiffer’s liberal views were well-known and over the next decades, he published an assortment of essays and treatises outlining all that was wrong with the German political system and how it needed to change. Among other things, he proposed the establishment of a German Supreme Court, and severe controls on sovereign powers wielded by the rulers of constituent states. Chief among his published works was his eight-volume magnum opus Praktische Ausführungen aus allen Teilen der Rechtswissenschaften, Mit Erkenntnissen des Oberappellationsgerichts zu Kassel or "Practical Explanations from all Parts of Jurisprudence, with Findings of the High Court of Appeal in Kassel," which was published between 1825 and 1846. It contains 98 essays, drawing from Pfeiffer’s decades of experience in the legal profession, and addresses problems with laws in all of the German states. The immense size of the work earned Pfeiffer the nickname der praktische Pfeiffer, or "the Practical Pfeiffer" for the rest of his life.

=== A new constitution and retirement ===
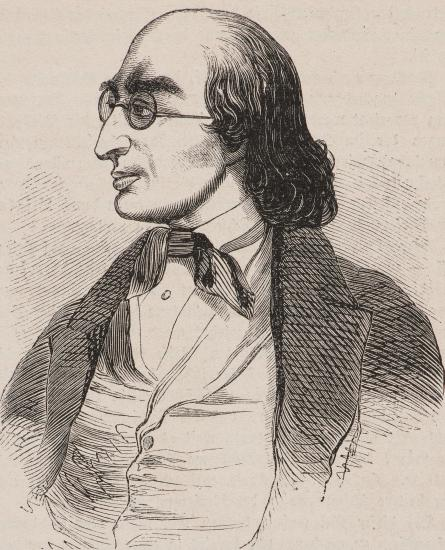
Pfeiffer's political nemesis, Ludwig Hassenpflug

In 1830, Pfeiffer's lifelong dedication to Hesse and its people was rewarded when the Elector, William II, invested him as a Commander, 2nd Class in the House Order of the Golden Lion. Pfeiffer’s aforementioned gratitude to both the Elector and his family forced him to accept the honor, but he deeply wished to decline, fearing that this recognition by the State would, in his own words, cause him “to lose the confidence of the estates, which he had earned so far, and thus to be disturbed in his desired participation in the great constitutional work.” (Note: "...weil er fürchtete, das ihm bisher bewiesene Zutrauen der Landstände zu verlieren und so in der ihm erwünschten Mitwirkung an dem großen Verfassungswerke gestört zu warden.") At his request, the announcement of his investment was left out of the official government circular, allowing him to continue his political career for the time being. In 1831, he took part in the conference that drafted the new constitution for the Electorate of Hesse, which was later described by Karl Marx as "the most liberal constitution [...] that has ever been promulgated in Europe." The new Elector was not pleased with the liberal stance of the new constitution, particularly the controls on his powers, but he nevertheless appointed Pfeiffer as president of the Landtag of Hesse. Concerned with Pfeiffer’s perceived closeness to the electoral family and court, despite his liberal credentials, the other members of the Landtag declared the election invalid, which led to a conflict with Ludwig Hassenpflug that would last the rest of his life. The next decade consisted largely of political maneuvering on Pfeiffer and Hassenpflug's parts, each working to outwit the other. In 1834, Hassenpflug's manipulation led to Pfeiffer being passed over for the role Landtag President, despite having held the position provisionally for over a year, in favor of a younger and less qualified colleague. In the wake of this derailment of his political career, and feeling his own age, he submitted a formal request to retire in 1842, but was refused by the Landtag with two simple words: nicht genehmigt (not authorized). After a year of hearing cases in absentia due to his ill health, Pfeiffer was permitted to retire in 1843. He continued to publish until 1851, but his influence and position in Hessian politics was finished.

== Family ==
In Cassel, on December 20, 1801, Burkhard Pfeiffer married Louise Susanne Arnoldine Harnier (12 June 1778 – 22 December 1847), daughter of Johann Caspar Harnier (1739–1811), the Hessian Minister of War, and his wife Susanna Henriette (née Dupré; 1748 – 1837). Other prominent members of her family included her brothers, the doctor Richard Maria Harnier and the politician Heinrich von Harnier; Her nephew was the painter Kaspar von Harnier, and her great-nephew was the African explorer Wilhelm von Harnier. The Harnier family were Huguenots of Walloon descent. The Pfeiffers had four children:

- Karl Kaspar Jacob (4 October 1803 – 31 July 1831)
- Ludwig Karl Georg (known as Louis; 4 July 1805 – 2 October 1877), physician, botanist, and conchologist.
- Marianne Sophie Henriette (17 June 1807 – 3 January 1892), second wife of Louis Spohr.
- Louise Katharine Karoline (25 December 1809 – 19 January 1886)

=== Karl Pfeiffer ===
Karl Pfeiffer's life was a short one, but in that short life he accomplished much, and left behind an unexpected legacy. His professional life was that of an assessor, or magistrate's assistant, but he was also something of a firebrand, publishing articles in the liberal political newspaper Der Verfassungsfreund alongside Karl Bernhardi and Ludwig Schwarzenberg. Karl also served in the Kassel Bürgergarde, or municipal watch, whose members financed his tombstone and organized his funeral. Karl Pfeiffer's private life proved just as interesting as his public one. By all accounts an accomplished poet, singer, and songwriter, Pfeiffer was particularly known during his life for composing Polenlieder, that is, songs in support and celebration of Polish freedom, which was a hot-button issue at the time. He maintained close friendships with Kassel's rising musical stars, including Friedrich Curschmann and Louis Spohr. The latter was the Hofkapellmeister at the Electoral court, with whom he both worked and performed, alongside his younger brother Louis, a talented lyric baritone in his own right. Their first collaboration was on an operatic retelling of Ludwig Tieck's novel Pietro von Abano. Originally, Pfeiffer had planned to compose the opera himself, but upon realizing the breadth and labor involved, asked his friend Spohr to take over he remaining musical composition aspect of the project, to great acclaim. One of Pfeiffer's poems, entitled Die Weihe der Töne, meaning "The Consecration of Sound," was Spohr's avowed favorite, and after Karl's death, the composer took the text of the poem and used it to create his Symphony No. 4. The poem was later translated into English as The Power of Sound by the Gresham Professor of Music Edward Taylor. Karl Pfeiffer's untimely death took a great toll on the artistic and political communities in Kassel; the pages of Der Verfassungfreund were edged in mourning black and the Bürgergarde wore black armbands. The dirge for his funeral service was composed by Spohr, who also arranged a version of Selig sind die Toten to be sung by Kassel's St. Cecilia Society at the dedication of Pfeiffer's memorial. The inscription thereon was composed by his friend Karl Bernhardi, and reads as follows:

Es sank der Tod in Wellen auf ihn nieder,
Als seines Geistes Kraft in Blüthe stand.
Der Polenkampf durchrauschte seine Lieder;
Der Völker Freiheit war sein Vaterland
Und alle Menschen waren seine Brüder. (Note: Death descended on him in waves, When his spirit's strength was in bloom. The Polish struggle rushed through his songs; The peoples' freedom was his fatherland And all men were his brothers.)

Soon after Pfeiffer's death, at the insistence of his friends who survived him, his father and sisters published a volume of his poetry entitled simply Gedichte, or Poems. Spohr would remain close with his family, connected as they were by grief and love of the deceased and his poetic legacy. Eventually, in 1836, after the death of his first wife, Spohr would marry Pfeiffer's younger sister Marianne, who would be instrumental in sustaining Spohr's legacy as a composer for generations to follow.

== Final years ==
The untimely death of Burkhard Pfeiffer's son Karl at the age of 28 from cholera had profound effect on both him and his wife. Pfeiffer found himself an outspoken advocate for public health and the treatment of disease, as well as a critic of war in general, which he believed responsible for the spread of disease. Louise Pfeiffer spent the years after her son's death in near-isolation, and her death in 1847 went almost unnoticed by the outside world, who had not seen or heard her in over a decade. After the death of his wife, Pfeiffer emerged somewhat from retirement, having seen the great work of his Hessian constitution begin to erode, and the rights of the people begin to wane, so he began writing newspaper articles challenging the men in power to return to their principles and reinforce the constitutional rights of the Hessian people. Despite this, and despite his lifelong efforts, in 1850 the Hessian constitutional crisis tore into his homeland, and in 1852 Burkhard Wilhelm Pfeiffer died.

== Published works ==
- Dissertatio inauguralis de praelegatis, Marburg 1798.
- Aufsätze über Gegenstände des römischen und deutschen Privatrechts, Marburg 1802.
- Über die Grenzen der Civil-Patrimonial-Jurisdiktion. Ein Beitrag zum Territorial-Staatsrecht, Göttingen 1806.
- Gesetzbuch nach seinen Abweichungen von Teutschlands gemeinem Rechte, Vol. I. & II. Göttingen 1808. (written with his younger brother Franz Georg Pfeiffer)
- Vollständige Unterweisung der Beamten des Civilstandes, in ihren sämmtlichen Verrichtungen, Kassel 1808. (He was not named as author until the fifth edition was published in Hannover in 1810.)
- Rechtsfälle, entschieden nach dem Gesetzbuche Napoleons, Vol. I. Hannover 1811. Vol. II. 1813.
- Rechtsfälle zur Erläuterung der Gerichtsverfassung und Prozeßordnungen Westfalens, Vol. I. Hannover 1812.
- Ideen zu einer neuen Gesetzgebung für teutsche Staaten, Göttingen 1815.
- Inwiefern sind Regierungshandlungen eines Zwischenherrschers für den rechtmäßigen Regenten nach seiner Rückkehr verbindlich?, Hannover 1819.
- Decisiones supremi tribunalis Hasso-Cassellani, P. 1-4. Kassel 1821.
- Recht der Kriegseroberung tu Beziehung auf Staatskapitalien, Kassel 1823.
- Ausführungen aus allen Teilen der Rechtswissenschaft; mit Erkenntnissen des Ober appellationsgerichts zu Kassel, Vol. I. Hannover 1825. Vol. II. 1828. Vol. III-VIII. 1830-1846. Register 1850.
- Grundzüge der rechtlichen Entscheidung des Sachsen-Gothaischen Successionsfalles, Kassel 1826.
- Ueber die Ordnung der Regierungs-Nachfolge in teutschen Staaten überhaupt, und in dem herzoglichen Gesammthause Sachsen-Gotha insbesondere, Vol. I & II, Kassel 1826.
- Einige Worte über den Entwurf einer Verfassungsurkunde für Kurhessen vom 7. Oktober 1830, Kassel 1830.
- Geschichte der landständischen Verfassung in Kurhessen, Kassel 1834.
- Praktischer Beitrag zur Lehre von Injurien und Majestätsbeleidigungen in Hitzig's Annalen der Kriminalrechtspflege, Vol. 18. S. 163 — 239. Berlin 1840
- Hessen und Hessenkassel in Weiske's Rechtslexikon, Vol. 5. Leipzig 1844
- Ausführliche Darstellung des gesummten Lehnrechts, Vol. 6. Leipzig 1845
- Über den altgermanischen Ursprung der Lehre vom unvordenklichen Besitze, in der Zeitschrift für deutsches Recht von Reyscher und Wilda, Vol. 8. Leipzig 1843.
- Die rechtlichen Verhältnisse der Witwenkassen, Zeitschrift für deutsches Recht von Reyscher und Wilda, Vol. 9. Tübingen 1845
- Sind die Sachen und Rechte der Städte einer Verjährung von 30 oder 40 Jahren unterworfen?, im Archiv für civilistische Praxis. Vol. 28. Heidelberg 1846.
- Über den Umfang der Anwendbarkeit der lex 68 Digestorum „Ad legem Falcidiam“ im Archiv für civilistische Praxis. Vol. 28. Heidelberg 1846.
- Der praktische Gebrauch und Nutzen der Schiedsgerichte in einzelnen Streitfällen, in der Zeitschrift für Civilrecht und Prozeß, herausgegeben von Linde, Marezoll und Schröter. Nene Folge. Vol. 3. Gießen 1847.
- Das deutsche Meierrecht nach seiner rechtlichen Begründung und dermaligen Gestaltung mit vielfältigen Belegen aus der Praxis der obersten Gerichtshöfe, Kassel 1848.
- Fingerzeige für alle deutschen Ständeversammlungen, Kassel 1849.
- Würdigung des Bundestags-Beschlusses vom 21. Sept. 1850, den dermaligen Conflict der kurhessischen Regierung mit den Ständen über die Steuerfrage betreffend, Kassel 1850.
- Der alte und der neue Bundestag, Kassel 1851.
- Selbständigkeit des Richteramts, Kassel 1851.
