= Johann Jakob Pfeiffer =

German theologian and educator

Johann Jakob Pfeiffer Dr. theol.
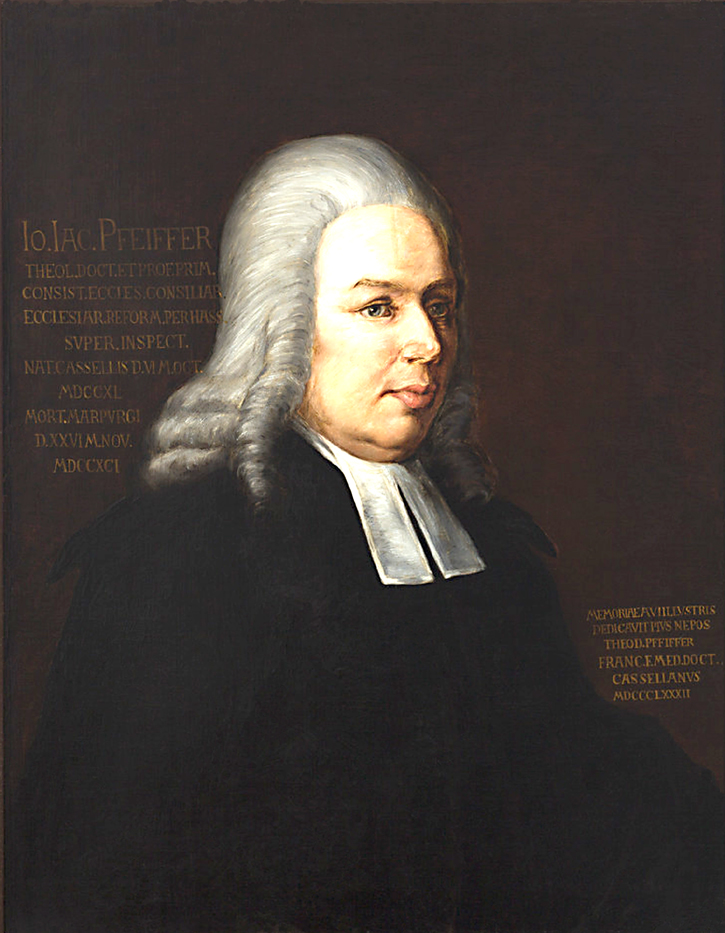
- Pfeiffer by Susette Hauptmann
- Born: Johann Jakob Pfeiffer; October 6, 1740; Cassel, Landgraviate of Hesse-Cassel, Holy Roman Empire
- Died: November 26, 1791 (aged 51); Marburg, Landgraviate of Hesse-Cassel, Holy Roman Empire
- Other names: Johann Jacob Pfeiffer, Johannes Jacobus Pfeiffer
- Occupations: Preacher, theologian, professor
- Years active: 1761-1791
- Spouses: Lucie Rebecke Rüppel (m. 1772; died 1784) Sophie Christine Waitz (m. 1785–1791)
- Relatives: Burkhard Wilhelm Pfeiffer, Carl Jonas Pfeiffer, Franz Georg Pfeiffer (sons); Dr. Louis Pfeiffer (grandson); Adolf von Deines, Georg Ledderhose, Albert Wigand (great-grandsons)

Johann Jakob Pfeiffer (6 October 1740 – 26 November 1791) was a German evangelical theologian, as well as a professor, and later, dean, at the University of Marburg.

== Life and career ==
Pfeiffer was the son of Kassel master dyer, Hieronymus Pfeiffer (30 December 1714 – 3 July 1774) and his wife Anne Elisabeth (née Schaumberg; 15 March 1718 – 23 March 1779). He was educated in Kassel's preparatory schools, and in 1755 he enrolled at the Collegium Carolinum. There, he studied under Johann Gottlieb Stegmann and Justus Heinrich Wetzel. In 1757, Pfeiffer began his studies at the University of Marburg. At university, he studied theology, mathematics, logic, and metaphysics. By 1760 he was attending the University of Göttingen and continuing his education in Theology under Samuel Christian Hollmann, Johann David Michaelis and Christian Wilhelm Franz Walch. By the next year, he had returned to his home as a preaching candidate, and in 1761 he was ordained and given a position as a preacher in Cassel. When he wasn’t actively preaching, he was known to continue his own theological education, as well as instruct his parishioners and neighbors in both Old and New Testament exegesis.

In 1765, Pfeiffer was assigned to a preaching position in Langenschwalbach. By his own testimony, taken many years later, the years he spent in Langenschwalbach were the happiest of his life. He returned to Cassel in 1769 to take up the position of preacher at Karlskirche, the central church of the Oberneustadt community.

In 1779, Pfeiffer was named director of the newly constructed Lyceum Fridericianum, but by December of that year, he had been appointed associate professor of Theology at the University of Marburg, replacing Heinrich Otto Duysing. From 1781 to 1790, he was the Dean of the Theology Faculty at the University. Pfeiffer was awarded his doctorate in Theology in 1784, and in 1789 was promoted to full professor. In addition to his duties as Dean and Professor, he also served as a Councilor of the Consistory, overseeing all evangelical protestant churches in the Landgraviate of Hesse-Cassel.

On October 2, 1791, Pfeiffer performed the confirmation of Prince William II, Elector of Hesse, whose religious instructor he had been for most of the prince's adolescence. Two months later, despite the ministrations of his colleague Christian Friedrich Michaelis, he died due to complications from a chronic inflammatory illness, from which he had suffered for many years.

== Family ==
Johann Jakob Pfeiffer married twice. On March 24, 1772 he married Lucie Rebecke (née Rüppel; 12 October 1752 – 11 January 1784), the daughter of Johannes Rüppel (1708-1770), onetime personal chaplain of Landgravine Charlotte of Hesse-Homburg and archdeacon of St Martin's Church, Kassel. Together they had the following children:

- Anne Catharine Elisabeth (13 December 1772 – 28 May 1777)
- Johanne Lucie Cornelie (3 May 1774 – 17 May 1796), married in 1792 to Georg Hermann Carl Kulenkamp, son of the jurist Friedrich Wilhelm Kulenkamp.
- Martha Conradine (15 September 1775 – 3 April 1826) After her sister's death in 1796, she married her widower, Georg Kulenkamp.
- Burkhard Wilhelm (7 May 1777 – 4 October 1852)
- Carl Jonas (7 February 1779 – 3 May 1836), married August 7, 1808 to Maria Louis Theodora (née Merrem, 1786- 31 August 1827), daughter of Blasius Merrem.
- Johann Georg Henrich (19 December 1780 – 27 January 1859)
- Franz Georg (11 January 1784 – 15 April 1856)
- Christian Hartmann (11 January 1784 – 23 July 1844)

Lucie Pfeiffer died giving birth to twin sons, Franz Georg and Christian Hartmann. On April 16, 1785, Pfeiffer married again, this time to Sophie Christine (née Waitz, 26 February 1754 – 4 March 1826), daughter of Johann August Waitz of Schwarzenfels. They had two daughters:

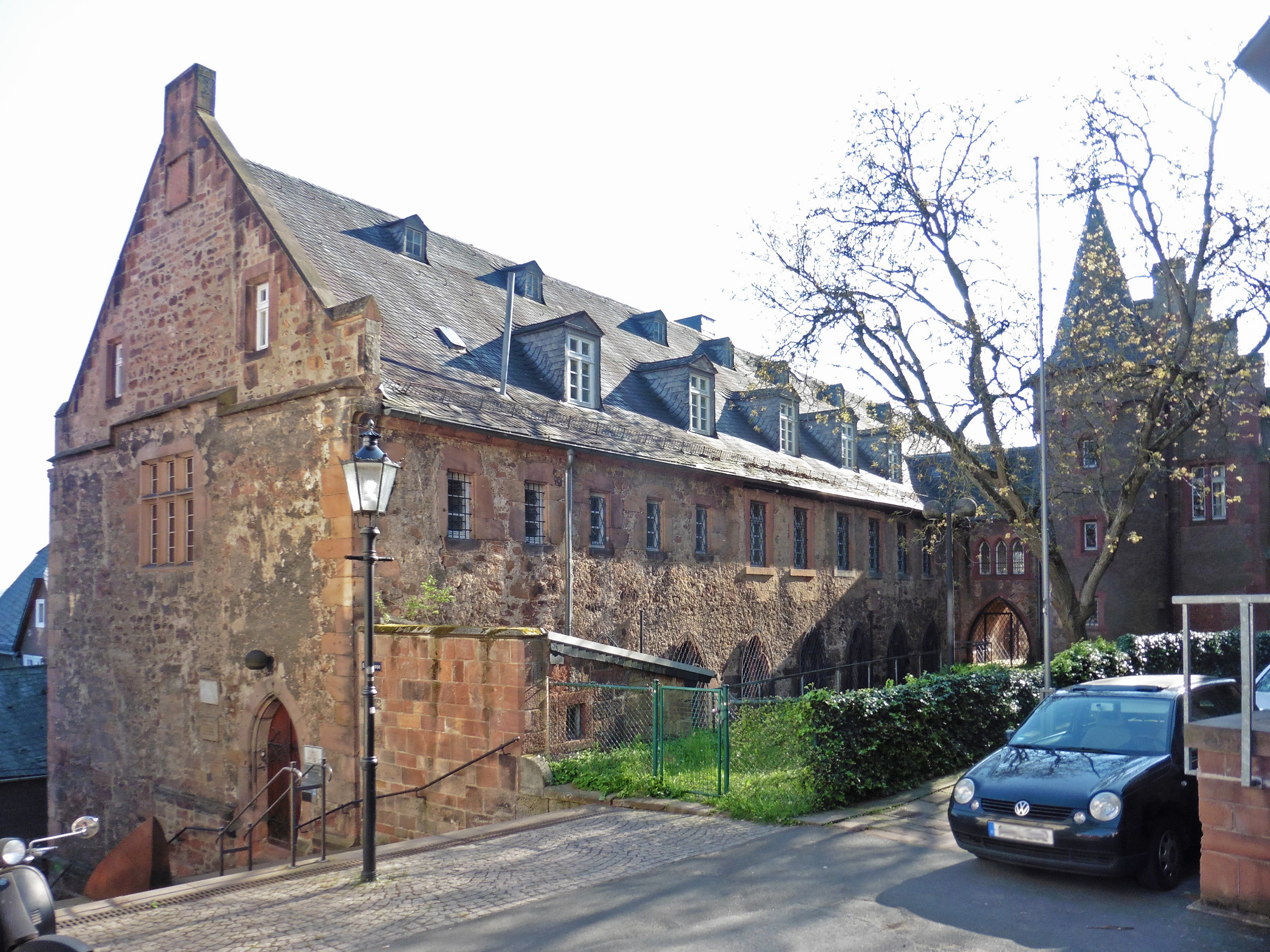
The Kugelhaus residence of the Marburg Theology Faculty, where Pfeiffer died in 1791

- Marianne Charlotte (16 February 1788 – 24 March 1863)
- Caroline Catherine Louise Henriette (18 March 1790 – 5 February 1875)

Through his marriage to his second wife, Pfeiffer became the brother-in-law of Jakob Ludwig Passavant, Johannes Bering, and Carl Wilhelm Robert, all of whom were married to his wife's sisters.

== Works ==
- Dissertatio Philosophica De Adquiescentia Hominum in Voluntate Divina' (with Johann Gottlieb Stegmann, Kassel 1756)
- Predigten (Kassel 1776)
- Entwurf zum Unterricht im Christenthum (Minden 1778, second edition Kassel 1783, third edition Kassel 1785, fourth edition Kassel 1791)
- Magnificentissimi Orationem Aditialem Viri Amplissimi Iohannis Henrici Iung in Auditorio Maiore Habendam Indicit (Kassel 1787)
- Progr. de praemiis virtutis christianae (Two parts, Marburg 1787–1788)
- Anweisung für Prediger, und die es werden wollen, zu einer treuen Führung ihres Amtes; nebst eingestreuten historischen und literarischen Bemerkungen (Marburg 1789)
