= Carl Jonas Pfeiffer =

German merchant, banker, and amateur malacologist

- Born: 7 February 1779; Cassel, Landgraviate of Hesse-Cassel, Holy Roman Empire
- Died: 5 March 1836 (aged 57); Cassel, Electorate of Hesse
- Education: University of Marburg (partial)
- Spouses: Maria Louisa Theodora Merrem (m. 1808; died 1827) Dorothea Margarita Karoline Magdalene Friederike Wilhelmine Günste (m. 1831)
- Relatives: Johann Jakob Pfeiffer (father); Burkhard Wilhelm Pfeiffer, Franz Georg Pfeiffer (brothers); Louis Pfeiffer (nephew)
- Scientific career
- Author abbrev. (zoology): C. Pfeiffer

Carl Jonas Pfeiffer (7 February 1779 – 3 May 1836) was a German merchant, banker, and amateur malacologist.

== Early life and business ventures ==
Pfeiffer, called Jonas as a child, was born in the Oberneustadt parsonage on Karlsplatz in Cassel, where his father, Johann Jakob Pfeiffer, was the preacher. Shortly after his birth, the family relocated to Marburg, where his father accepted a position as a professor in the Department of Theology at the university there. His mother died before he was 5 years old, but his father's second wife cared for all of their children, especially after Johann Jakob's early death in 1791. Pfeiffer attended the gymnasium of Marburg until the age of 14, at which point he relocated to Cassel to apprentice as a cloth merchant. At the completion of his apprenticeship, he spent time as a traveling salesman in Frankfurt am Main, but soon found himself back in Marburg, where, despite not attending the University, as had his father and brothers, he spent time learning French, Hungarian and Spanish. He also attended lectures by some of the academic luminaries of the time, such as Michael Conrad Curtius on history and statistics, Johannes Bering on logic, Johann Heinrich Jung on occupation science, and Carl Wilhelm Justi on aesthetics.

By 1803, Carl Pfeiffer and his brother Georg were living in Hanau, where they had take over running a snuff factory owned by their uncle Simon Rüppell and his partner Wilhelm von Harnier, prominent bankers in Frankfurt. Drawing on his experience as a traveling salesman, as well as his knowledge of languages, Carl undertook many journeys throughout central Europe in the interest of increasing tobacco sales. He travelled on horseback through Germany, Austria, Hungary and Switzerland, and often claimed that there was not a single town in Bavaria that he had not visited, no matter how remote. In 1807, the Napoleonic Wars transformed the borders of the German states, with Cassel becoming the capital of the new Kingdom of Westphalia, and Hanau being absorbed into the newly created Grand Duchy of Frankfurt. This created new borders and customs issues that affected trade and commerce throughout the region, which spurred the brothers Pfeiffer to open a second snuff factory in Cassel, so as not to lose their profitable business in lower Hesse. George relocated to Cassel, while Carl remained in Hanau, where he tried and filed to set up a Turkey red yarn-dying factory, but that venture proved unsuccessful. Due to the difficulties presented by the interruptions in the Napoleonic period, the brothers realized that they were well-positioned to engage in banking, having business interests in both Cassel and Hanau. With the return to normalcy after the re-establishment of the Electorate of Hesse, the factory in Hanau was closed. In the meantime, George and their eldest brother Burkhard Wilhelm purchased (for 17,0000 thaler) a grand house on the Königsplatz in Cassel, directly next to the Hôtel zum König von Preußen, which had formerly been owned by Louis, Landgrave of Hesse-Philippsthal. The production of tobacco took place in a workshop and warehouse behind the residence, augmented by extensive gardens. After Burkhard Wilhelm was forced to relocated to Lübeck in 1820, Carl and his family moved into the vacant second floor. Around 1825, Carl and Georg ceded the tobacco business to their cousins Hartmann and Wilhelm Pfeiffer, who relocated the factory, and focused themselves solely on their banking interests.

== Scientific career ==
While living in Hanau, Carl Pfeiffer cultivated a friendship with the naturalist Gottfried Gärtner, which resulted in a deep interest in botany and the natural world. Pfeiffer's curiosity eventually settled on conchology, a field in which his nephew Louis Pfeiffer would eventually achieve renown. His particular specialty was land snails. In Hanau, and later in Cassel, Carl would spend his evening walks searching for snails and mollusks anywhere they could be found: hedges, old masonry, stagnant water, ponds and streams. He trained himself to kill the animals without damaging their shells, which he would then store in small green and white card boxes (handmade for that purpose), and meticulously classify. Carl's reduced role in the banking business after 1823 afforded him more time to engage in his scientific pursuits, as indicated by the publishing of additional volumes of his conchological work. His scholarship was well-received by the academic community, despite his lack of formal training, and he was given membership in the natural history societies of Wetterau, Bonn, Frankfurt, Marburg, Paris and Lund in recognition of his scholarship.

=== Organisms described ===
- Lithoglyphus naticoides
- Pisidium
- Stagnicola fuscus
- Clausilia obtusa
- Theodoxus prevostianus
- Macrogastra badia
- Urticicola umbrosus
- Vidovicia caerulans
- Clausilia minima
- Valvata (Atropidina) depressa
- Cochlodina costata
- Kosicia intermedia syn for Chilostoma intermedium
- Unio elongatulus
- Caucasotachea vindobonensis
- Carychium menkeanum
- Theodoxus danubialis
- Theodoxus transversalis
- Clausilia gracilis
- Fusulus interruptus
- Edentiella leucozona
- Edentiella lurida
- Clausilia pumila
- Holandriana holandrii
- Pseudofusulus varians

== Family and later life ==
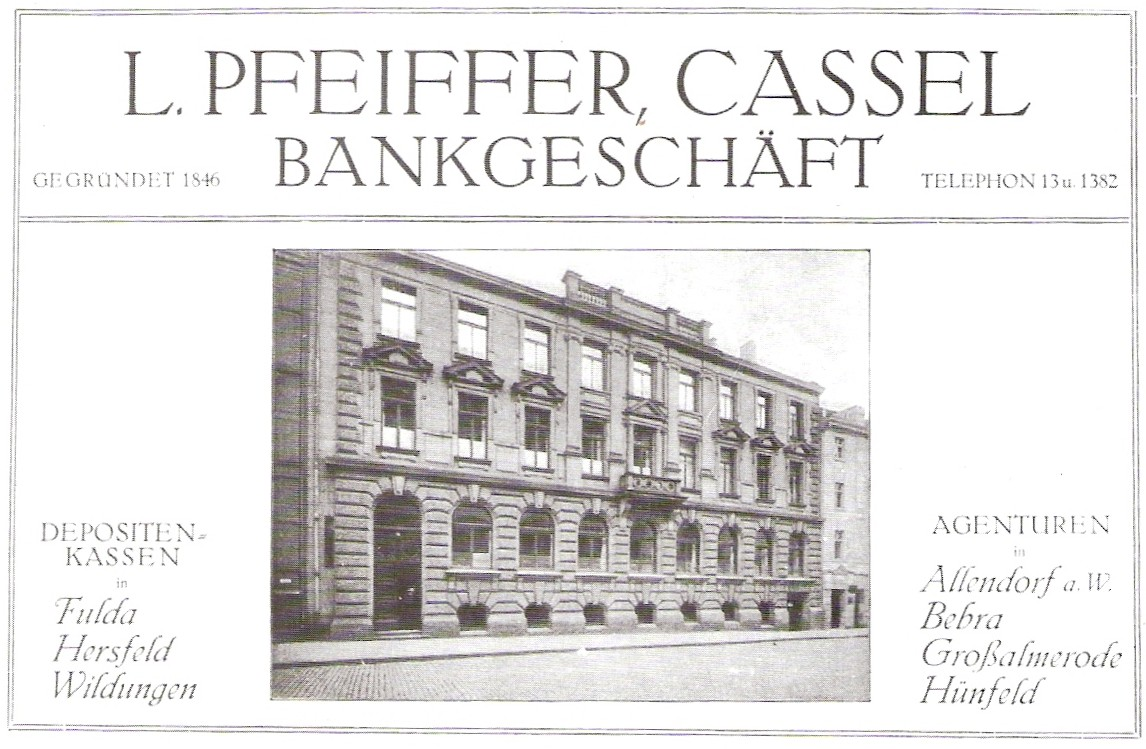
Carl's banking interests would eventually become Bankgeschäft L. Pfeiffer and flourish under family directorship for four generations

Carl Jonas Pfeiffer was married twice. He married his first wife, Louise Marie Theodore (née Merrem, 13 October 1787 – 31 Aug 1827) on August 7, 1808, in Marburg. She was the eldest daughter of the naturalist and University of Marburg professor Blasius Merrem (4 February 1761 – 23 February 1824) and his wife Juliane Johanne Marie (née von Cotzhausen, 1759–1808). This union produced three children:

- Georg Ludwig (18 July 1809 – 1892)
- Marie Sophie Christiane (14 December 1810 – 22 March 1850)
- Carl Wilhelm Theodor (19 May 1816 – after 1886)

Louise Pfeiffer had spent much of her late life in delicate health, and Carl had purchased her a garden plot on the Akazienallee in Cassel, where he built her a small summer home. Despite his best efforts, she died on August 31, 1827, at the age of 39. In 1831, Carl remarried, this time to his erstwhile childhood sweetheart, Friederike (née Günste, 1 December 1784 –13 July 1871). Their happiness was short-lived, however, as Carl suffered a debilitating stroke in that same year, and never recovered. Carl Jonas Pfeiffer died on May 30, 1836, just weeks after his daughter's wedding. By this time, his elder son had taken over his banking interests, and his younger son had followed his grandfather's footsteps and was living in Switzerland as a preacher. At his death, Carl Pfeiffer's extensive collection of malacological and conchological specimens was given partly to his friend, Dr. Karl Theodor Menke, and partly to his nephew, Dr. Louis Pfeiffer.

== Bibliography ==
- Systematische Anordnung und Beschreibung deutscher Land- und Süßwasserschnecken, mit besonderer Rücksicht aus die bisher in Hessen gefundenen Arten. Cassel: Schüppelschen Buchhandlung. 1821.
- Naturgeschichte deutscher Land- und Süßwasser-Mollusken. Vol. 1. Weimar: Verlage des Grosherzogl. Sächs. Privil. Landes-Industrie-Comptoirs. 1825. (re-issue of the above)
- Naturgeschichte deutscher Land- und Süßwasser-Mollusken. Vol. 2. Weimar: Verlage des Grosherzogl. Sächs. Privil. Landes-Industrie-Comptoirs. 1825.
- Naturgeschichte deutscher Land- und Süßwasser-Mollusken. Vol. 3. Weimar: Verlage des Grosherzogl. Sächs. Privil. Landes-Industrie-Comptoirs. 1828.
