= Order of the Crown of Westphalia =

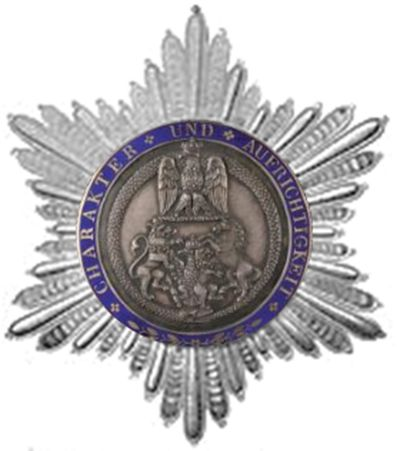
- Breast star of the Order

Awarded by King of Westphalia
- Type: Order of chivalry
- Established: 25 December 1809
- Motto: CHARACTER UND AUFRICHTIGKEIT ("Character and Honesty")
- Awarded for: Service, at the monarch's pleasure
- Status: extinct
- Founder: Jérôme Bonaparte
- Grades: Royal Prince Grand Cross; Grand Commander; Commander

Precedence
- Next (higher): none (highest)
- Next (lower): Médaille d'honneur militaire
- Ribbon bar of the order

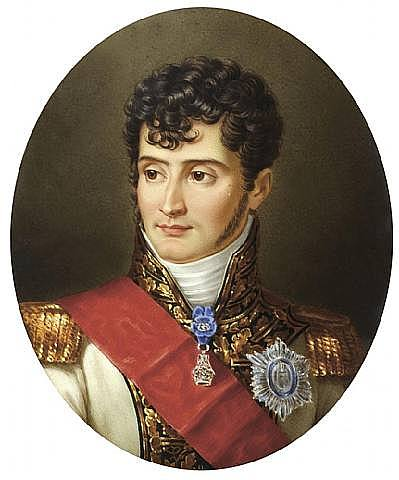
Jérôme Bonaparte. Painted by Sophie Lienard.

The Order of the Crown of Westphalia (German: Orden der Westfälischen Krone) was instituted in Paris on 25 December 1809 by King Hieronymus I of Westphalen, better known as Napoleon's brother Jérôme Bonaparte. The motto of the Order was "CHARACTER UND AUFRICHTIGKEIT" (Character and honesty). At the back stood the words "ERRICHTET DEN XXV DEZEMBER MDCCCIX".

The ribbon of the Order was dark blue.

== History ==
On July 7, 1807, Napoleon I gave his youngest brother Jérôme Bonaparte the Kingdom of Westphalia, created from scratch from hitherto independent German states. After entrusting the organization to confirmed French statesmen, such as Count Joseph Jérôme Simeon (1749-1842), he invited Jérôme to take possession of his kingdom on December 7, 1807.

The organized kingdom, the sovereign was wanting only a decoration to give to his subjects. Jérôme presented to the Emperor in July 1808 a project of order and motivated:

"The institution of a Westphalian order should please the Germans ... Your Majesty knows their character, many of them have been forced to leave their decorations and nothing will be more pleasant to them than to see a new order of theirs founded kingdom. "

The insignia, in the form of an eight-pointed cross with spokes, would have been placed in the center of the Westphalian eagle. The institution would have taken the name of Order of the Blue Eagle. Napoleon did not accede to the wishes of his brother. The insignia was too much like that of the Legion of Honor, and then the Emperor considered the sovereignty of his younger brother to be too recent for him to consider rewarding anyone.

Finally, on December 25, 1809, "with imperial authorization," the king was able to sign the royal decrees of creation of the Order of the Crown of Westphalia.

According to the decree of February 5, 1810, the insignia, inspired by the coat of arms of the kingdom created in 1807 under the direction of Talleyrand, revealed a complex symbolism: a snake biting its tail, symbol of immortality, surrounded a set of motifs illustrating the composite nature of the kingdom, all surmounted by a crowned imperial eagle. "There are too many animals in that order! Exclaimed the Emperor, reading the decree.

Jérôme gave his work on the job. A new decree was drawn up, issued on April 25, 1810, which definitively fixed the composition of the insignia, with a general outline close to that of the Order of the Iron Crown. Above a crown bandeau, we find the symbolic elements of the previous badge: heraldic animals, snake in bail, and of course the imperial eagle encroaching a lightning.

Despite all the pomp that surrounded him, the Order disappeared with the kingdom of Westphalia in 1813. Jérôme nevertheless continued to wear the insignia until his death in 1860.

== Organization ==
The members were divided into three and four classes. This order was to consist of:

10 Grand Commanders or dignitaries, three of whom each have a large commandery; 30 Commanders; 300 Knights of 1st class; 500 Knights of 2nd class. Not included in this number are the princes of the imperial family and foreigners to whom his Majesty would like to confer this decoration.

The King is Grand Master of the Order.

The Royal Prince alone rightly receives the great decoration of the Order.

The Grand Commanders have the title of Excellence, and enjoy the civil honors bestowed on the Grand Officers of the Crown, and military honors rendered to the highest rank.

The Commanders receive the same civil honors as the state councilors, and the military honors attached to the rank of officer.

== Description ==
The decoration is composed of a crown with eight gold florets without apses, placed on a blue enameled headband, on which are written in Roman letters in gold and in all its periphery, the motto of the order): "CHARAKTER UND AUFRICHTIGKEIT "(in French:" Honesty and character "), as well as the date of its founding:" ERRICHTET DEN XXV DEC M. DCCC IX ".

On the bottom of the crown and in the middle pose an eagle and a lion backed and crowned by a single crown.

On the right side of the lion, is the horse of Westphalia; on the left, on the side of the eagle, is the lion of Cassel.

The whole is surmounted by the imperial eagle crowned and carried on its lightning, on which is written: "I THE UNITED. "

The decoration is suspended from a big-blue ribbon moiré, by a ring having the shape of a snake biting its tail, symbol of the immortality.

The reverse of the cross is absolutely similar, with this difference only, that there is on the eagle and lion backed, an azure shield on which are the Roman letters "H N" intertwined.

The Grand Commander's decoration is thirty lines high, from the underside of the crown band to below the crown of the imperial eagle. That of Commander has only twenty-three leagues high and that of Chevalier only sixteen.

The Great Commanders wear the decoration, over the suit, from right to left.

The knights fastened a badge of silver to the clerk, and the commanders hung a jewel of gold around their necks. The great commanders wore daily a plate - novelty compared to the decree of February 5, 1810 which did not provide - and a cord. On solemn days, they wore a gold necklace.
