= Lycée Champollion =

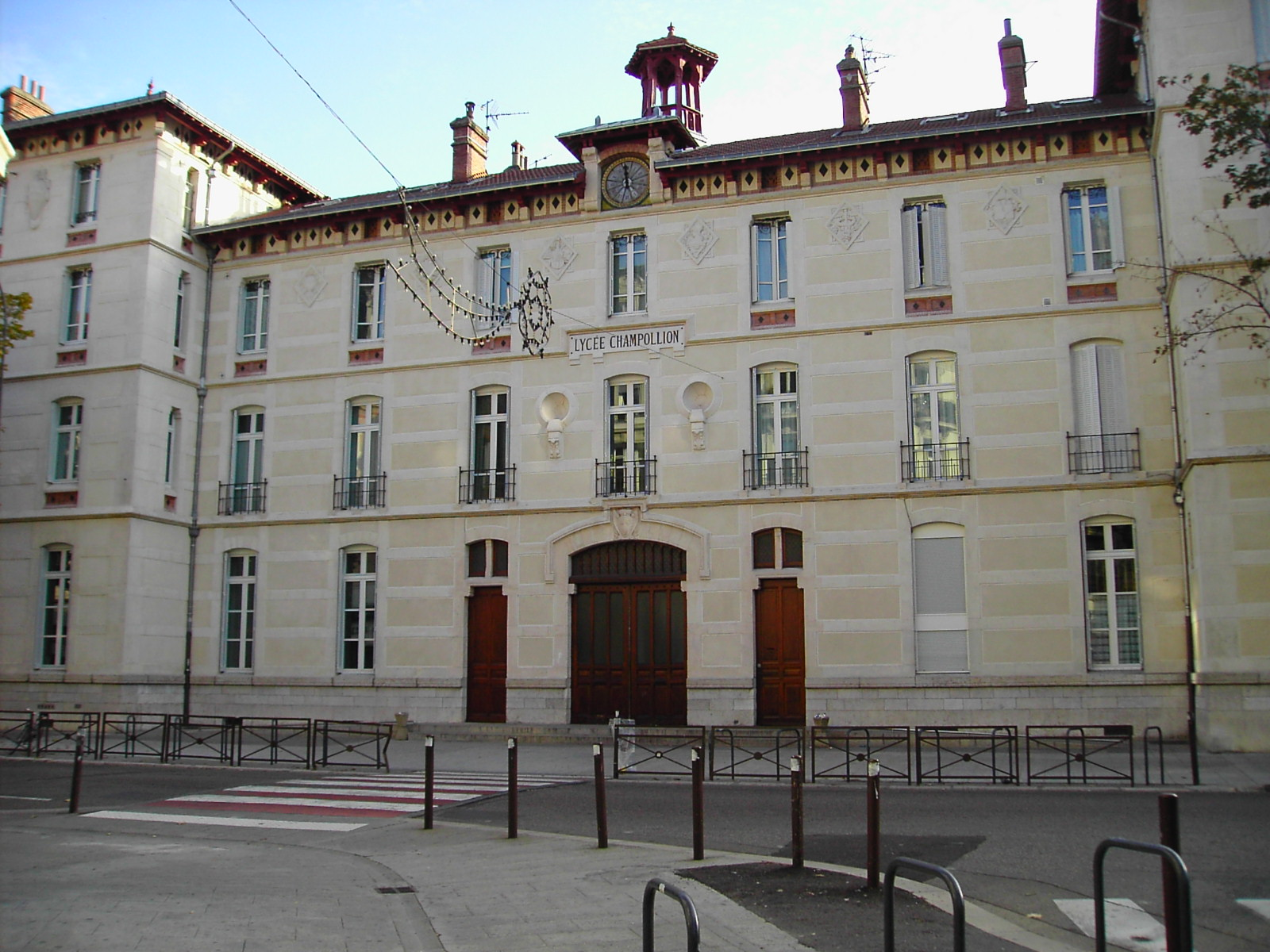
- Main entrance of the Lycée Champollion

Location
- 1 cours Lafontaine; Grenoble, 38000; France

Information
- Type: Lycée public
- Established: 1887
- Head of school: Manuel Neves

The lycée Champollion or "Champo" is a French secondary school and higher education establishment in Grenoble, at 1 Cours Lafontaine, one block from the Place Victor Hugo. Its present director is M. Neves. It was M. Mattone before him.

The second oldest lycée in Grenoble (after the lycée Stendhal, where the linguist Jean-François Champollion was educated), the lycée Champollion is best known for the quality of its classes préparatoires, making it the traditional school for the elites of Dauphiné and Savoy.

In 2017, 350 pupils were studying in Seconde, 256 in Première, 232 in Terminale and 982 in CPGE, at the lycée Champollion.

== History ==
The decision to build a second lycée in the town and to name it after the linguist Champollion was taken in 1880. Designs were commissioned from the architect Joseph Auguste Émile Vaudremer and the building was completed in October 1887.

== The languages studied ==
List of languages in alphabetical order:

- (Germany) German
- (United Kingdom) (United States) English
- (Spain) Spanish
- (Italy) Italian

== Options ==
- Ancient Greek
- Latin
- Plastic arts
- Music

== Classes Préparatoires ==
In 2007, about 800 students were in classes préparatoires at the lycée Champollion. In 2022, they were about 1000.
