= Demetrius Stefanovich Schilizzi =

- Δημήτριος Στεφάνοβικ Σκυλίτσης
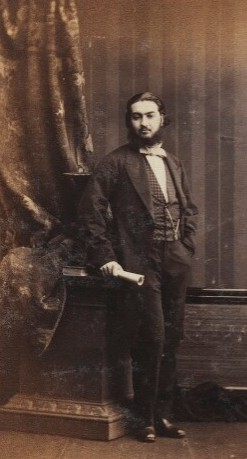
- Demetrius Stefanovich Schilizzi, 1861 photograph
- Born: 1839; Constantinople, Ottoman Empire
- Died: 1893 (aged 53–54)
- Occupations: Banker; Steamship Owner; Acting Italian Consul for India; Composer
- Parents: Zannis Stefanovich Schilizzi (father); Eleni Vouro (mother)

Demetrius Stefanovich Schilizzi (many spellings; Greek: Δημήτριος Στεφάνοβικ Σκυλίτσης; 1839–1893) was an Ottoman-born Greek banker in London and Paris, and later a steamship owner in Constantinople. He was also the acting Italian consul in Calcutta for some time starting in 1864, and an amateur composer.

== Life ==
Demetrius was born in Constantinople to Zannis Stefanovich Schilizzi (1806–1888), one of the Schilizzi merchant and shipping family originally from Chios, (Note: The modern Greek form of the surname is Skylitsis.) and Eleni Vouro. The Schilizzi family was one of the trading dynasties that arose after the 1822 Chios massacre of the Greek War of Independence. Demetrius' uncle J. S. Schilizzi (1805–1892) was in the Black Sea grain trade at Livorno, and founded a London branch in 1837. Demetrius Schilizzi began his banking career in Paris.

In 1871 Demetrius Schilizzi was living in Surrey Gardens, Hyde Park, London, with J. S. Schilizzi. In 1873 the London firm Schilizzi & Co. was restructured, with J. S. Schilizzi retaining the name, and Demetrius and two other family members forming Schilizzi Brothers, in business at 25 Austin Friars. He was also a director of the Imperial Bank, joining its board in 1873 on the death of Pantaleone Constantine Ralli. He became a naturalised British subject on 27 February 1874.

On his death Schilizzi left a reported £600,000 in securities, largely to a brother and nephew. He was buried at the Şişli Greek Orthodox Cemetery.

== Benefactor ==
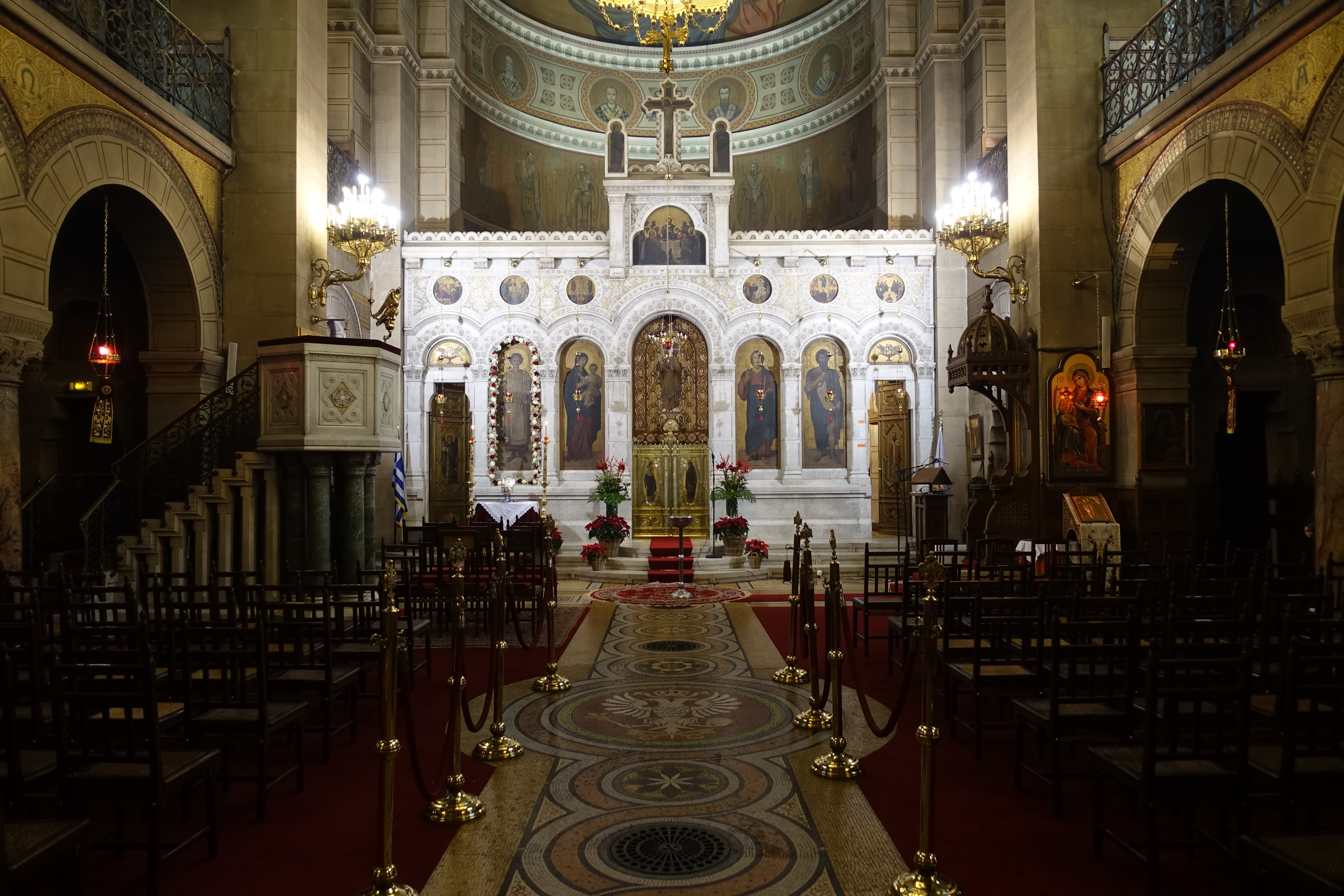
The Greek Orthodox cathedral in Paris, commissioned by Schilizzi, internal view

The Greek Orthodox cathedral of St. Stephen in Rue Georges Bizet, Paris, designed by Joseph Auguste Émile Vaudremer and decorated by Charles Lameire and Ludwig Thiersch (iconostasis), and a home for the aged (present-day Foyer Jean Bosco) by the same architect in the Rue de Varize, were commissioned by Schlizzi, who did not live to see them completed. Schilizzi's brother Paul oversaw and possibly funded the completion of the work. Demetrius Schilizzi had earlier been on the Building Committee of St Sophia's Cathedral, London.

== Musical works ==
Schilizzi's works include Hélène, polka-mazurka, published in Paris by E. Girod, 1858, and Fantaisie élégante pour la flûte, published by Legouix, 1861. (Note: A piano roll of Fantaisie élégante was issued in 1905.) The fifth fantasy in Jean Rémusat's Le Flûtiste romancier, published 1959, and the second number in Jules Demersseman's Six petites fantaisies faciles pour deux flûtes, Op. 28 bis, appear both to be using a melody from a romance composed by Schilizzi, titled Simplicité.
