= Joseph Auguste Émile Vaudremer =

French architect (1829–1914)

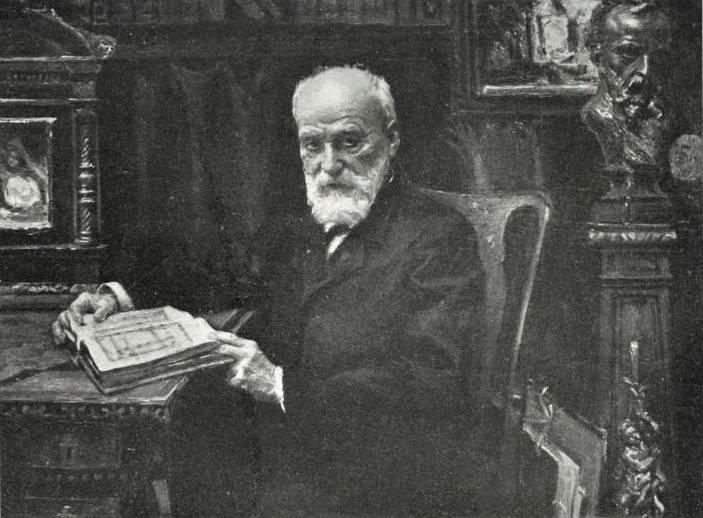
- Photograph by Jean-Joseph Weerts
- Born: 6 February 1829; Paris
- Died: 7 February 1914 (aged 85); Antibes
- Occupation: Architect
- Awards: Prix de Rome (1854)

Joseph Auguste Émile Vaudremer (6 February 1829 – 7 February 1914) was a French architect. He won the prix de Rome and designed several public buildings in France, particularly in Paris, four of which have been designated monuments historiques.

== Life ==
Entering the École nationale supérieure des beaux-arts in 1847, he apprenticed in the practice of Guillaume Abel Blouet. Winning the lauréat du premier grand of the Prix de Rome in 1854, he resided at the French Academy in Rome at the Villa Medici from 20 January 1855 to 31 December 1858.

He spent his career as a public architect with several prestigious posts, including Architect of the City of Paris, inspector-general of buildings, member of the Conseil supérieur for prisons and of the Conseil for collèges and lycées, diocesan architect for several départements, and finally teaching at the École nationale supérieure des beaux-arts, from which he also ran his own practice. Notable among his pupils were Jacques Hermant, and the Americans Louis Sullivan, Theophilus Parsons Chandler Jr. and Arthur Rotch.

In 1867 he was elected to the seventh seat of the Académie des Beaux-Arts, architecture section, succeeding Alphonse de Gisors. He is buried in the cimetière Saint-Véran at Avignon.

== Work ==
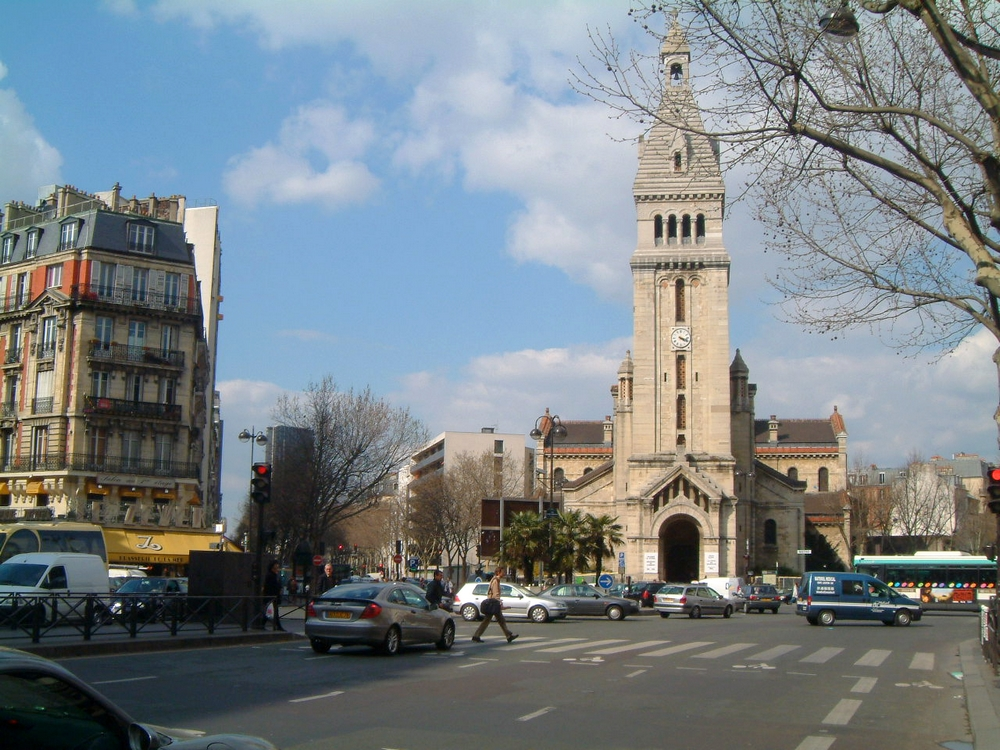
Saint-Pierre-de-Montrouge, Paris

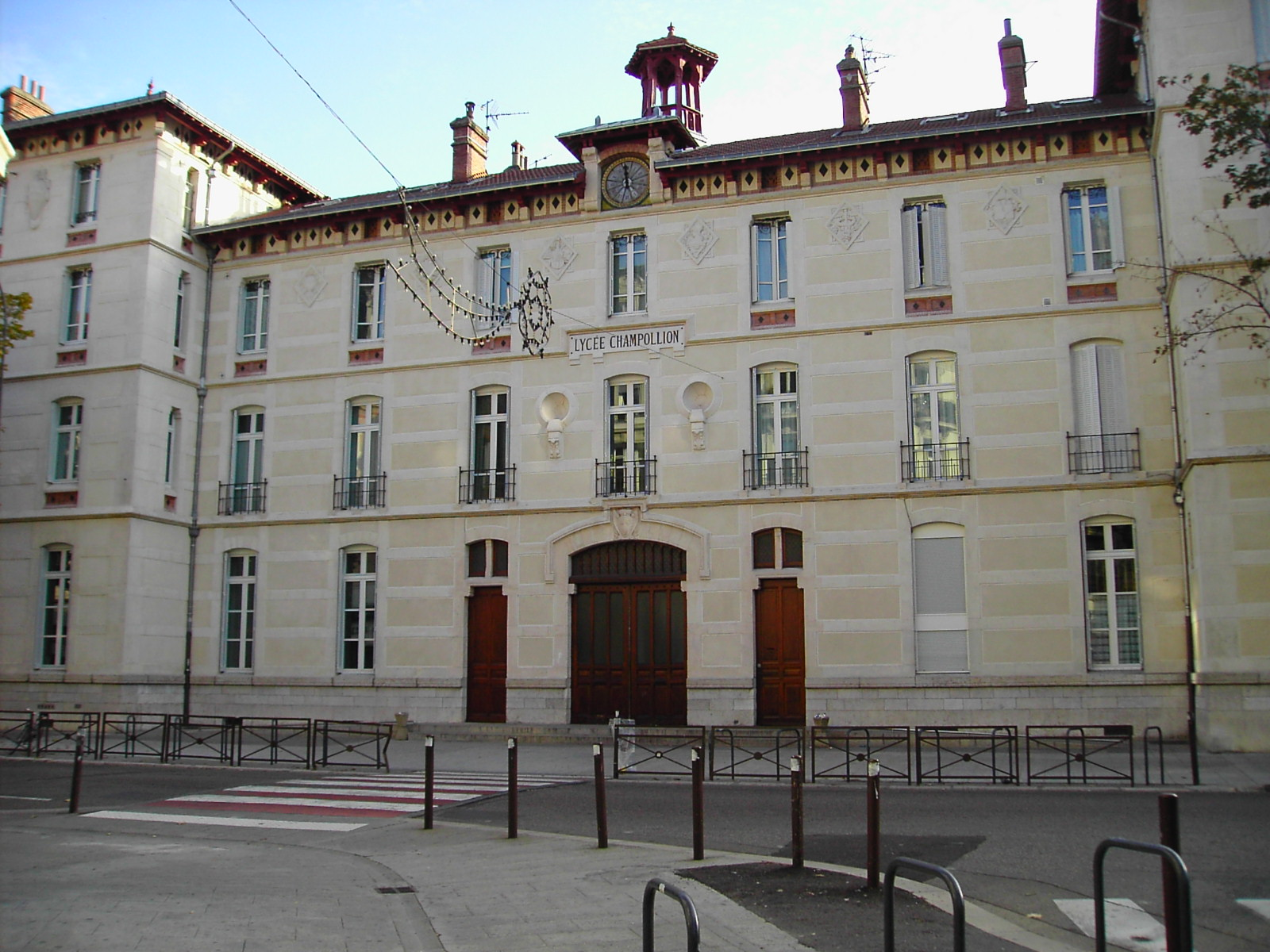
Lycée Champollion, Grenoble

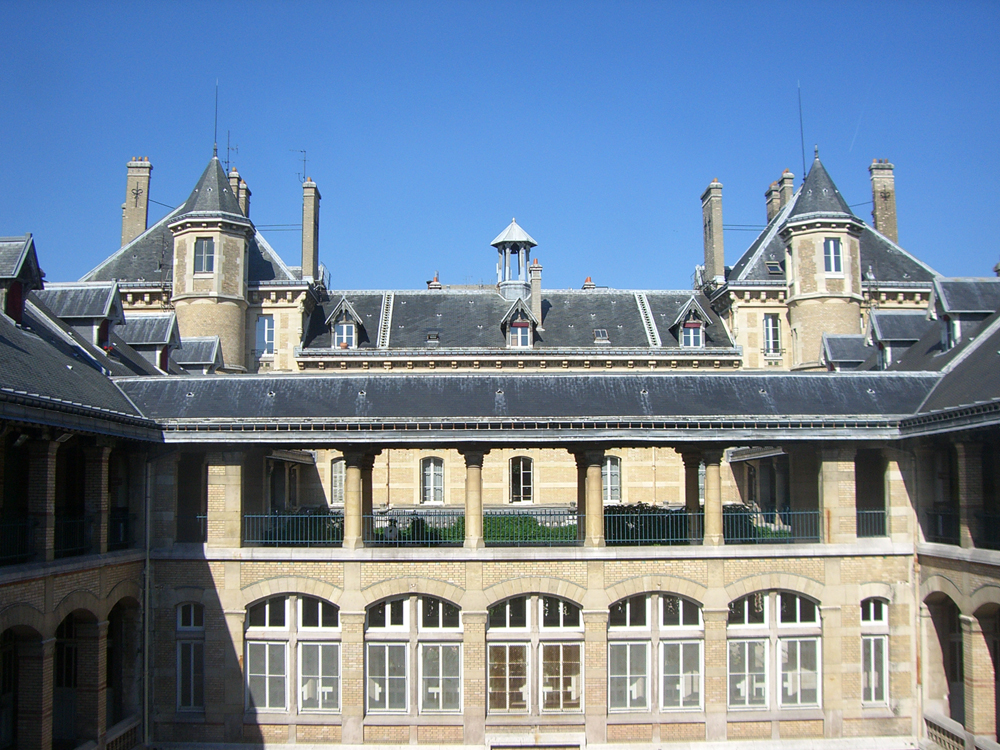
Lycée Buffon, Paris

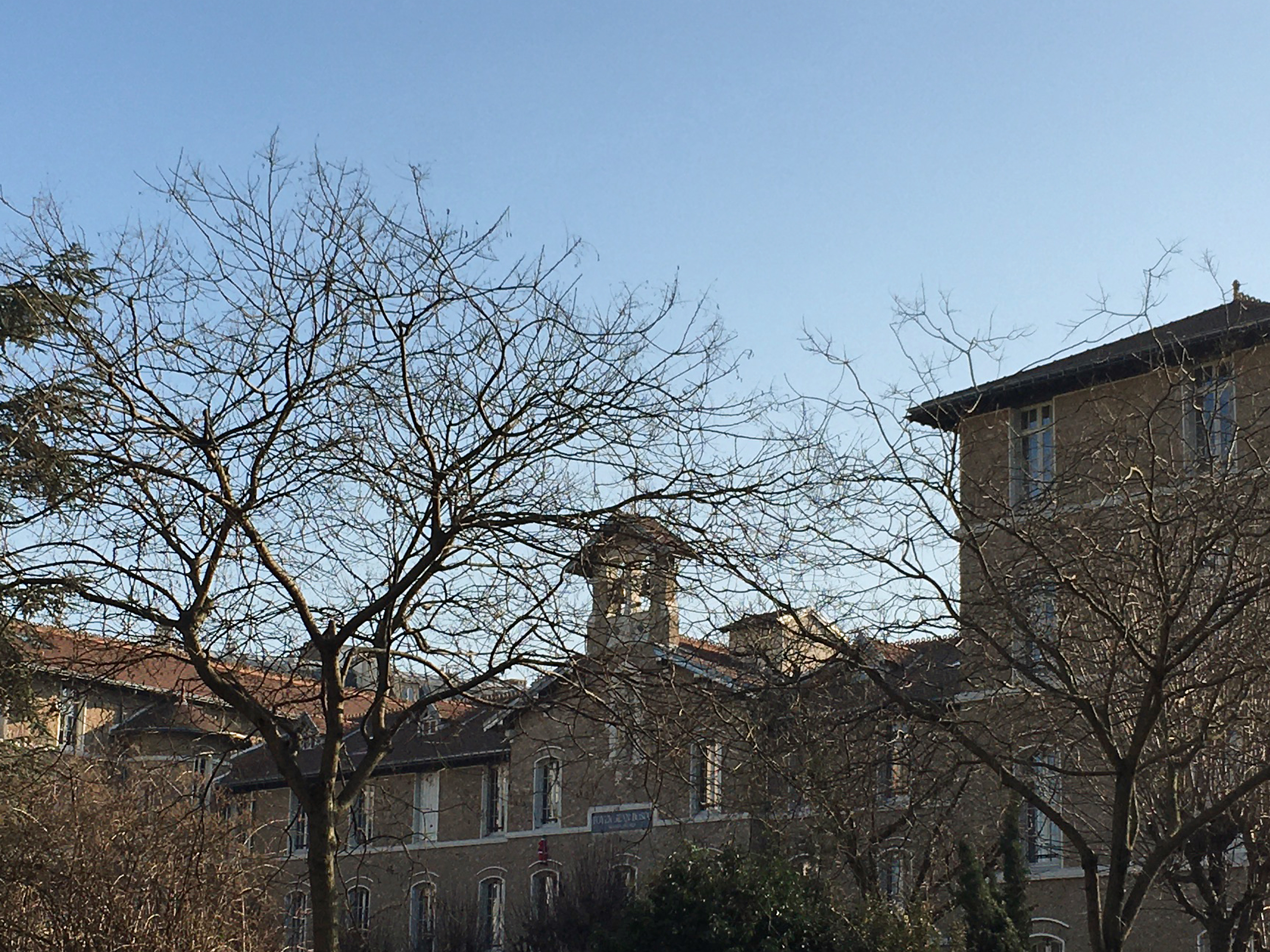
Foyer Jean Bosco, Paris
- 1861–1867: Prison de la Santé, 13th arrondissement of Paris
- 1865–1870: Saint-Pierre de Montrouge, 14th arrondissement of Paris (inscribed MH)
- 1873: primary school of the Ville de Paris (present-day Collège Alberto Giacometti), 14th arrondissement of Paris
- 1873: Commemorative monument of the Battle of Champigny, Champigny-sur-Marne
- 1877–1879: Protestant Temple of Belleville, 97 rue Julien-Lacroix, 20th arrondissement of Paris
- 1877–1892: Notre-Dame-d'Auteuil, 16th arrondissement of Paris
- 1879: Episcopal Palace, Beauvais
- 1882: Villa Collin, Fourqueux, for Armand Collin (a watchmaker and friend of Vaudremer's) (classed MH)
- 1882–1887: boys' lycée (present-day Lycée Champollion), Grenoble
- 1883–1886: girls' lycée (present-day Lycée Michelet), Montauban
- 1885: Collège Guettard, Étampes
- 1885–1888: boys' lycée (present-day Lycée Buffon), 15th arrondissement of Paris
- 1886–1888: former girls' lycée (present-day Lycée Molière), 16th arrondissement of Paris
- 1890–1895: Greek Orthodox church, 5–7 rue Bizet, 16th arrondissement of Paris, commissioned by Demetrius Stefanovich Schilizzi (inscribed MH)
- 1896–1897: home for the aged (present-day Foyer Jean Bosco), 23 rue Varize, 16th arrondissement of Paris, commissioned by Schilizzi
- 1897: flats, 27 avenue Georges-Mandel, 16th arrondissement of Paris (inscribed MH)
- 1900–1903: Église Saint-Antoine-des-Quinze-Vingts, 12th arrondissement of Paris

== Bibliography ==
- (in French) Alice Thomine, Émile Vaudremer (1829-1914), la rigueur de l'architecture publique, (Librairie de l'architecture et de la ville.) 382 p. Paris: Picard, 2004 ISBN 2-7084-0630-2 (published version of the author's thesis)
