= St. Stephen's Greek Orthodox Cathedral, Paris =

St. Stephen's Greek Orthodox Cathedral
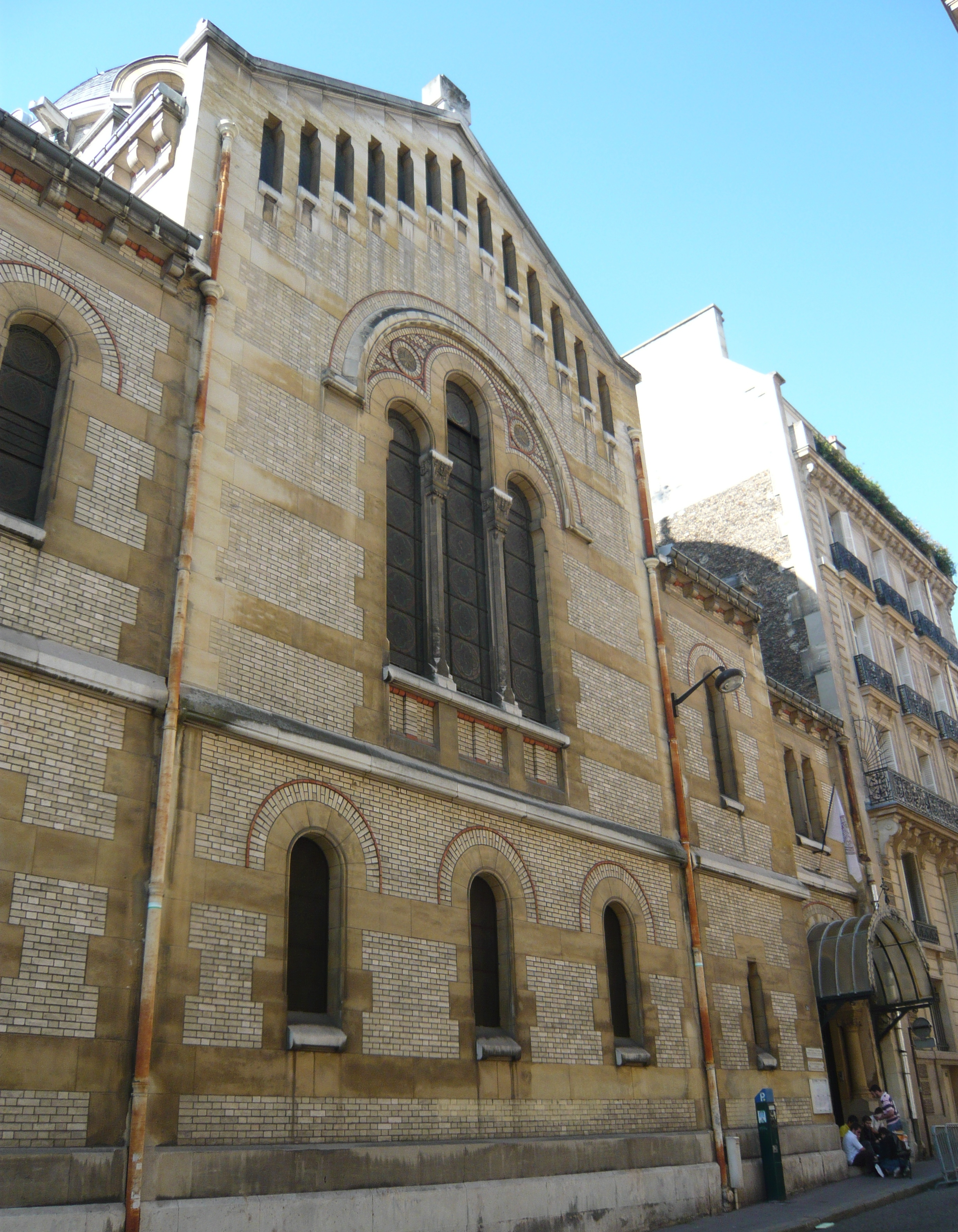

- 48°52′00″N 2°17′55″E
- Location: 7 rue Georges-Bizet, Paris
- Country: France
- Denomination: Greek Orthodox

History
- Status: Cathedral
- Consecrated: 22 December 1895

Architecture
- Functional status: Active
- Architect: Émile Vaudremer

Monument historique
- Type: Église
- Designated: 1995
- Reference no.: PA00135368

St. Stephen's Greek Orthodox Cathedral is the seat of the Greek Orthodox Metropolis of France in Paris. It is located at 7 rue Georges-Bizet, in the 16th arrondissement of Paris. It was consecrated on 22 December 1895.

== History ==
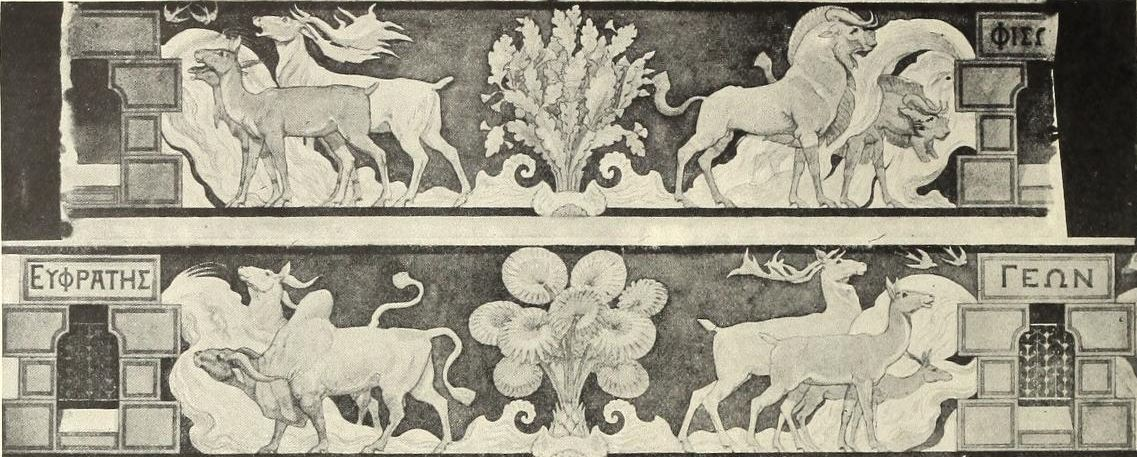
Black-and-white reproduction of a drawing by Charles Lameire of the frieze on the inner side of the cupola's drum, depicting the four rivers in the Garden of Eden.

Before the church was consecrated, there had been at least two attempts at creating a permanent Greek Orthodox place of worship in Paris. The church was commissioned by Demetrius Stefanovich Schilizzi, designed by architect Émile Vaudremer, and built by Guillotin. The purchase price of the site and construction cost amounted to F1,630,000 in total. The inside walls were decorated by Charles Lameire and the marble iconostasis by Ludwig Thiersch. Léon Avenet worked on the stained glass.

People for whom funeral offices were held in this church include Charles Debbas (August 1935), Eleftherios Venizelos (21 March 1936) and Maria Callas (20 September 1977). The wedding of Édith Piaf and Théo Sarapo was celebrated there also on 9 October 1962.

== Gallery ==
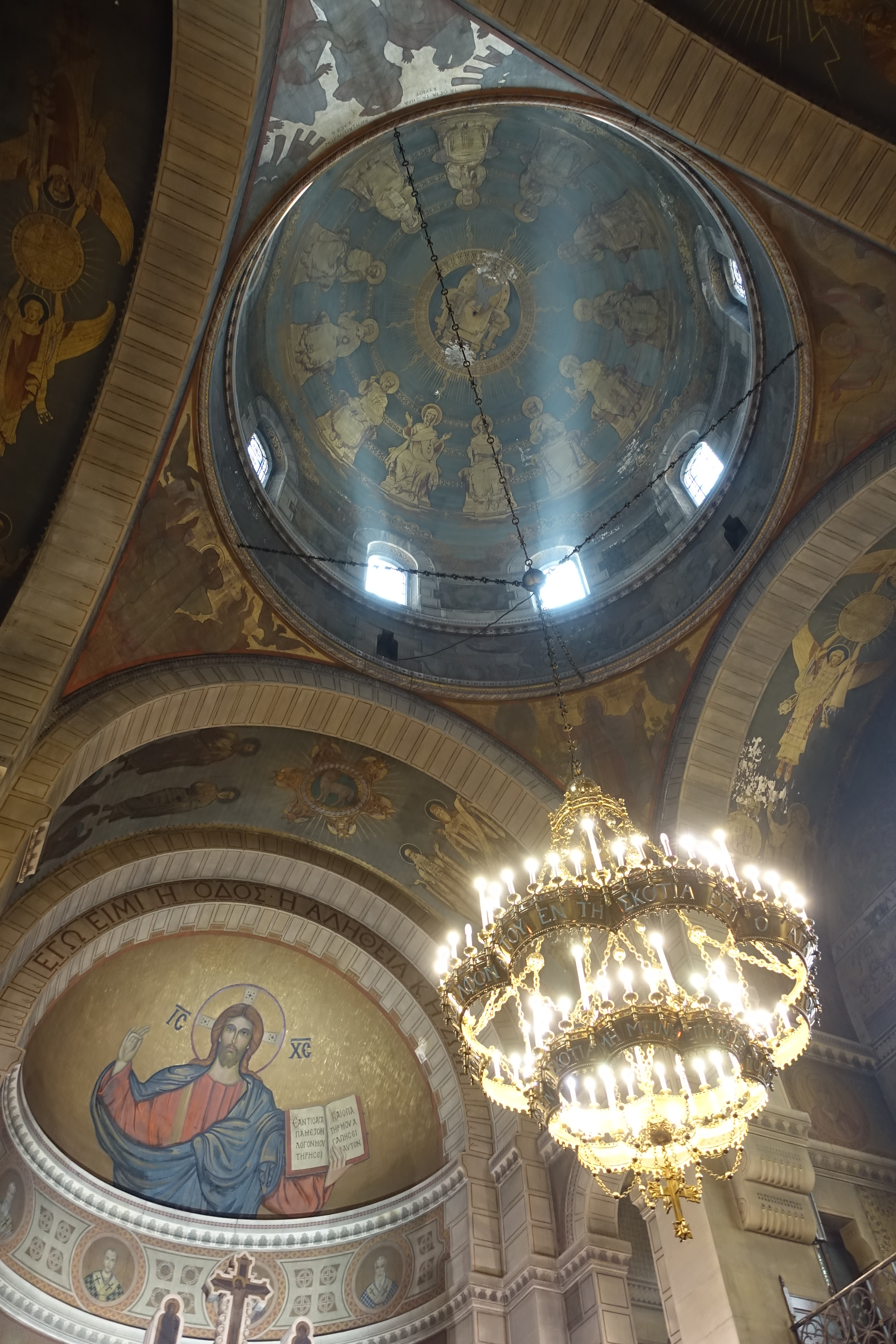

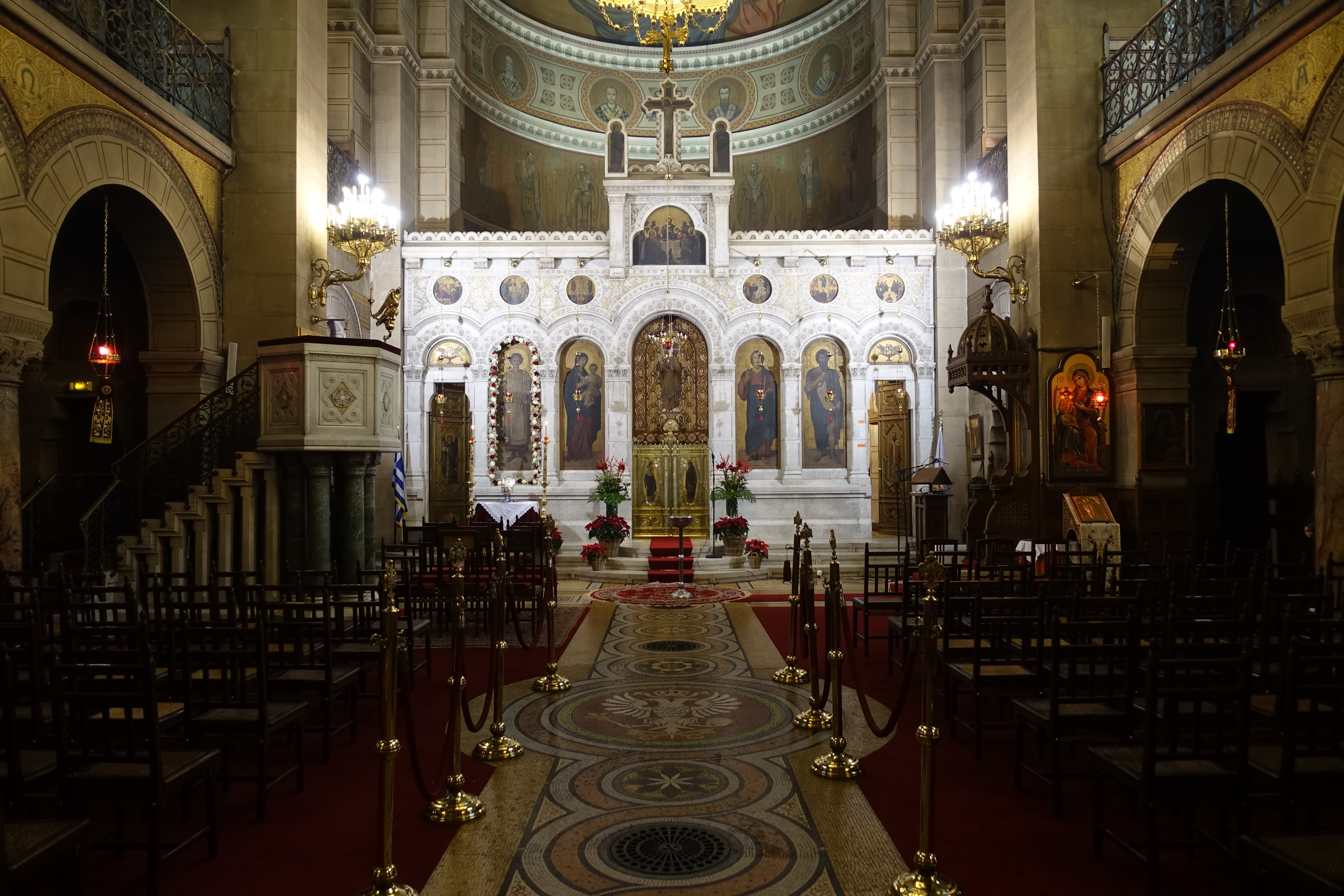

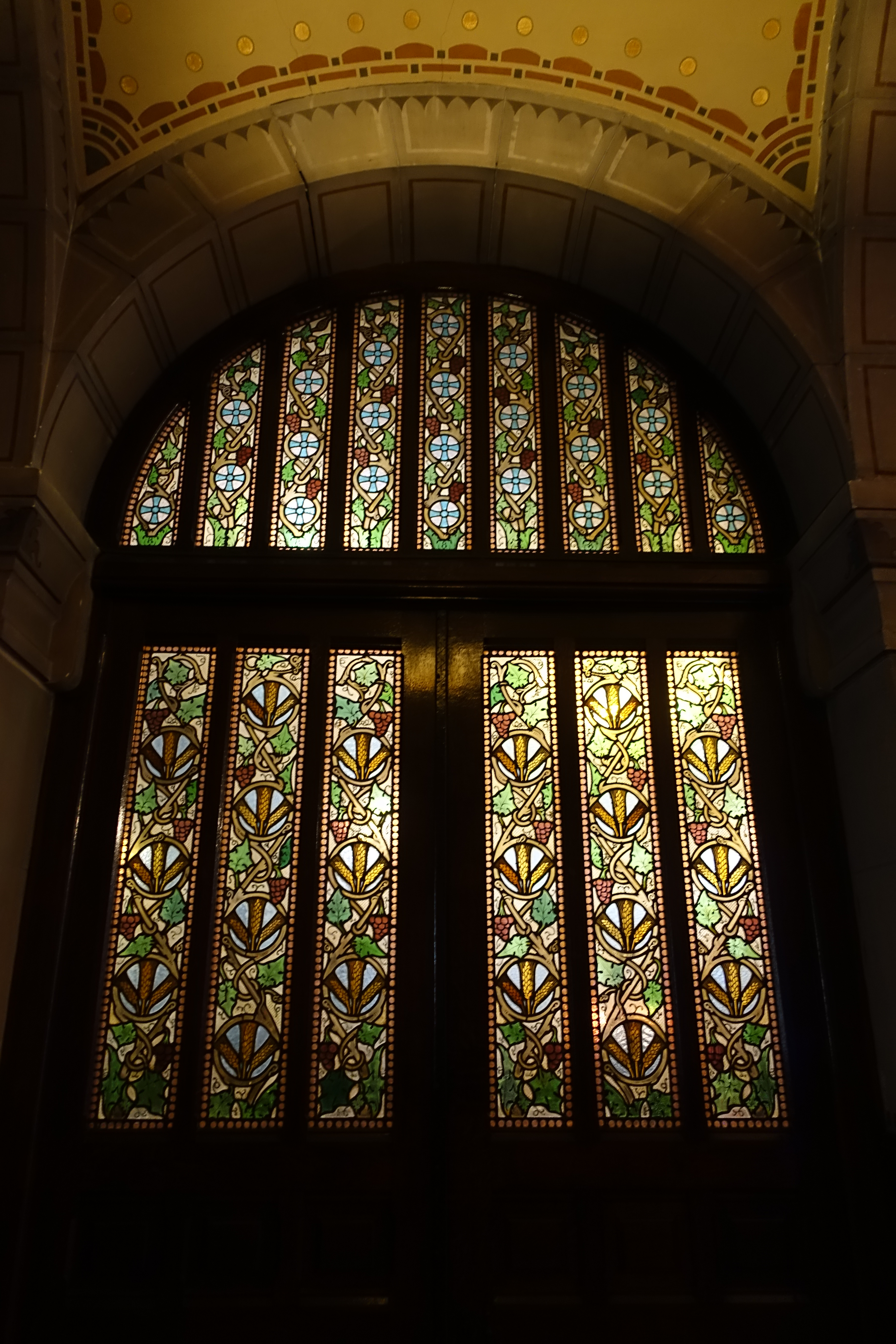
