= Saint-Pierre de Montrouge =

Church of Saint-Pierre de Montrouge
- Église Saint-Pierre de Montrouge
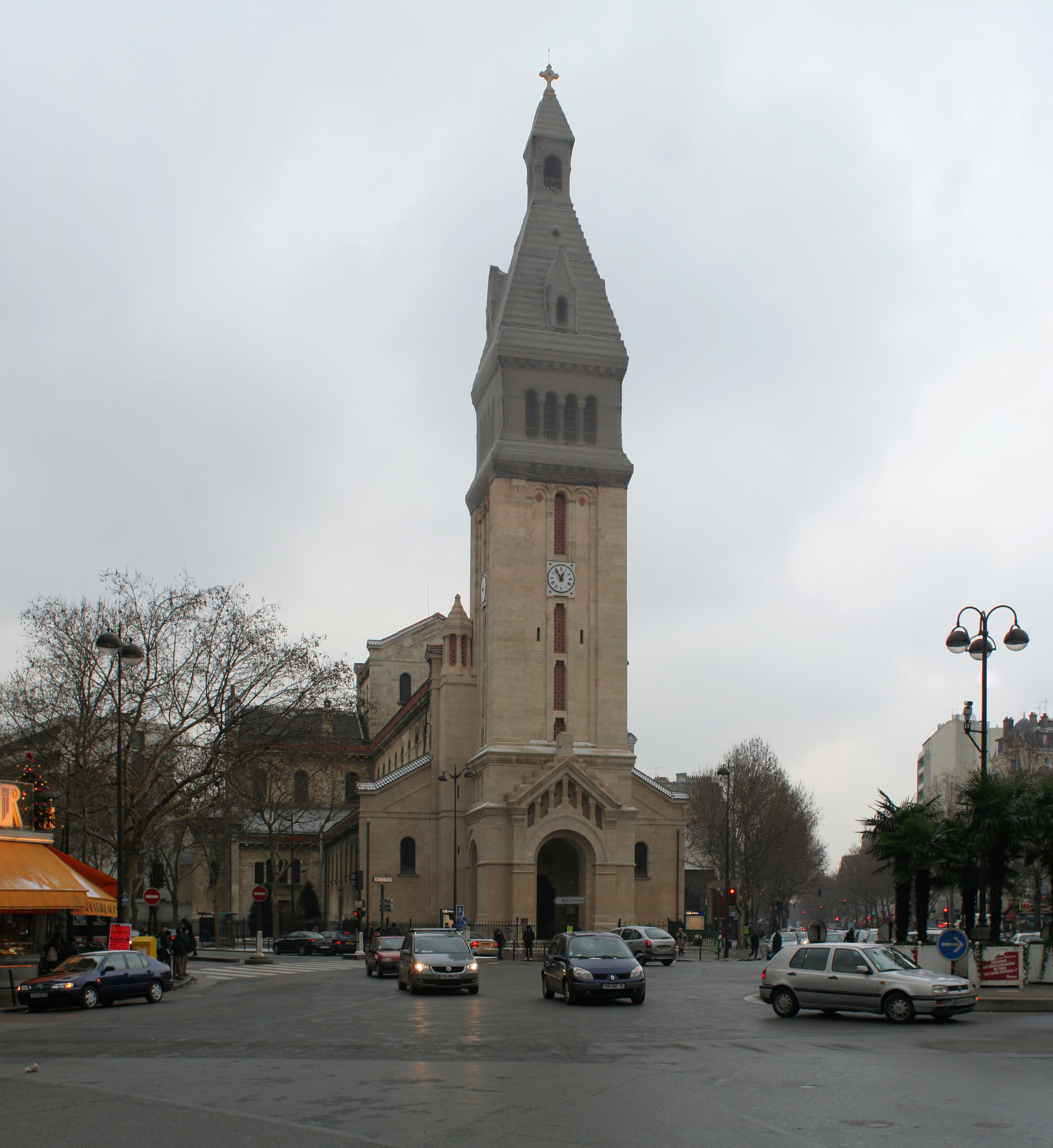
- Church of Saint-Pierre de Montrouge
- 48°49′43.1″N 2°19′37.3″E
- Location: 14th arrondissement of Paris
- Country: France
- Denomination: Roman Catholic Church
- Website: saintpierredemontrouge.fr

Saint-Pierre de Montrouge (French pronunciation: [sɛ̃ pjɛʁ də mɔ̃.ʁuʒ]) is a Roman Catholic parish church located at 82 avenue du General Leclerc in the Petit-Montrouge quarter of the 14th arrondissement of Paris It occupies a triangular lot at the intersection of two major streets, the Avenue du Maine and the Avenue General-Leclerc. It was built in 1863 in the Neo-classical style. It was inscribed as an historic monument of Paris in 1982.

== History ==
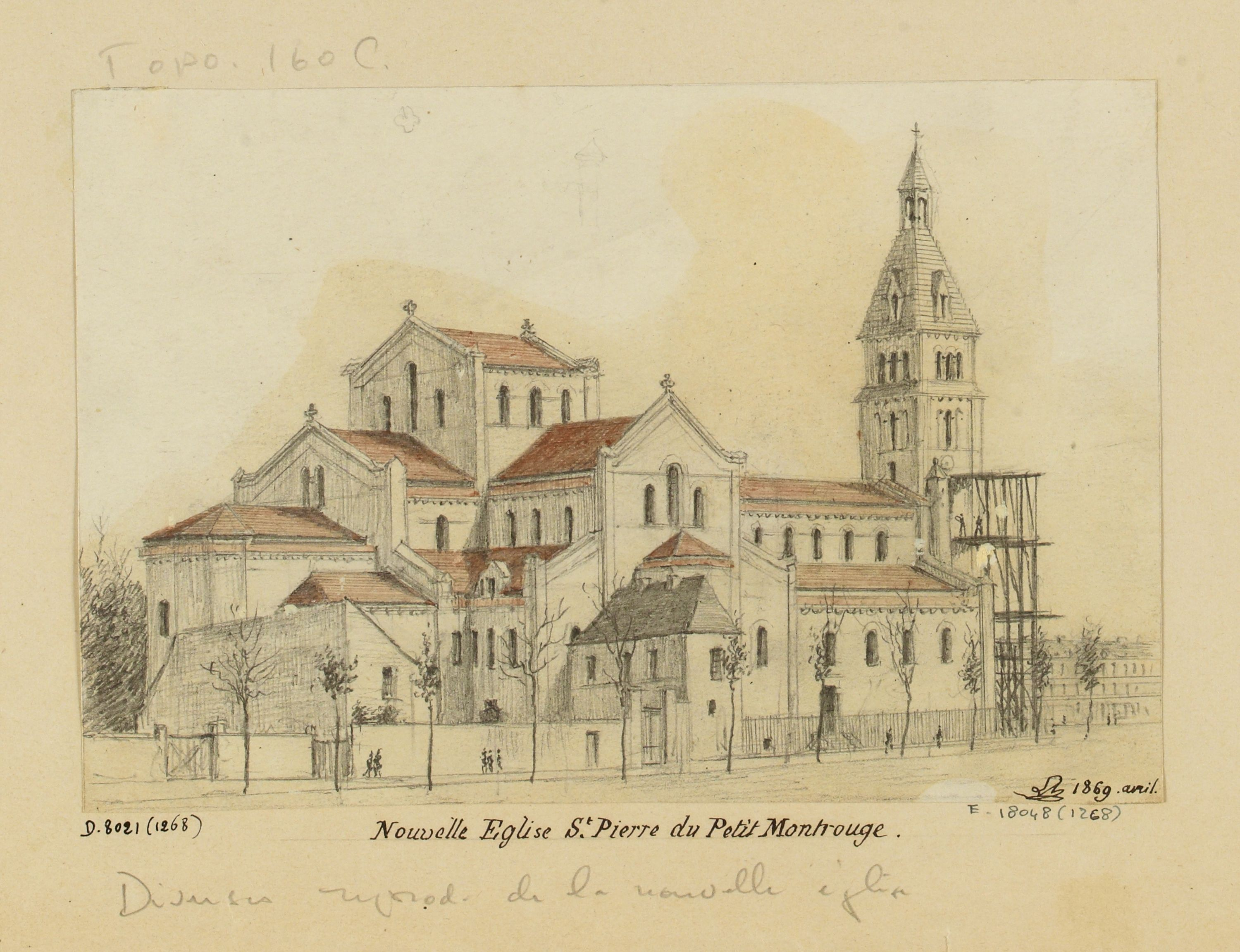
The church in the 1870s

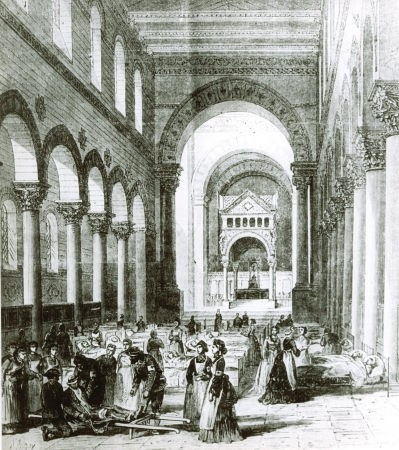
The church became a hospital during the 1870 Siege of Paris

The church was built beginning in 1863, as part of the grand reconstruction of central Paris ordered by Napoleon III and carried out by his prefect of the city, Baron Haussmann. and by Emile Vaudremer (1829–1914, the architect charged with designing the 14e arrondissement. It occupies a triangular site bounded by the Avenue du Maine and the Avenue du Général-Leclerc, and its bell-tower faces the quarter's central square. Place Victor-et-Helene-Basch. The nearest metro station is Alesia.

The church served as a hospital and survived bombardments during the Siege of Paris by the Prussians in 1870–1871. During the Paris Commune, the church was closed and turned into a workers' club.

The church was designed by Joseph Auguste Émile Vaudremer, architect of the city of Paris. He was particularly inspired by early Christian basilicas and Romanesque churches. His other works included the Notre-Dame d'Auteuil (1877–1892) and Saint-Antoine-des-Quinze-Vingts, finished in 1903.The name of the church was inspired by the reddish color of the iron-oxide that was common in the area. r

== Architecture ==
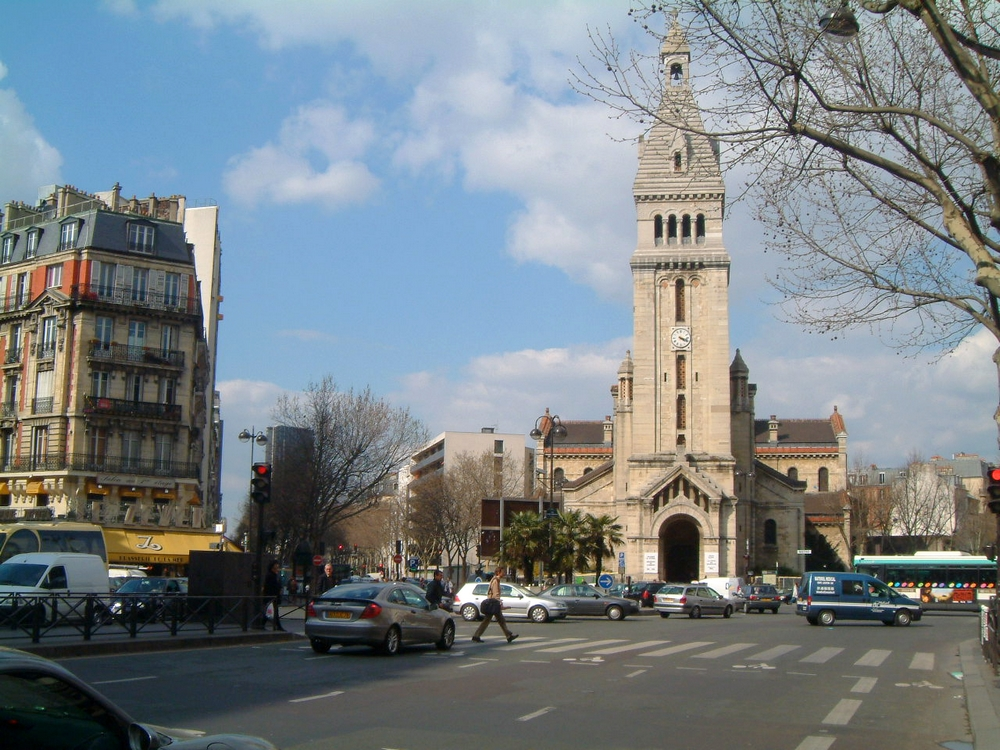
The bell tower

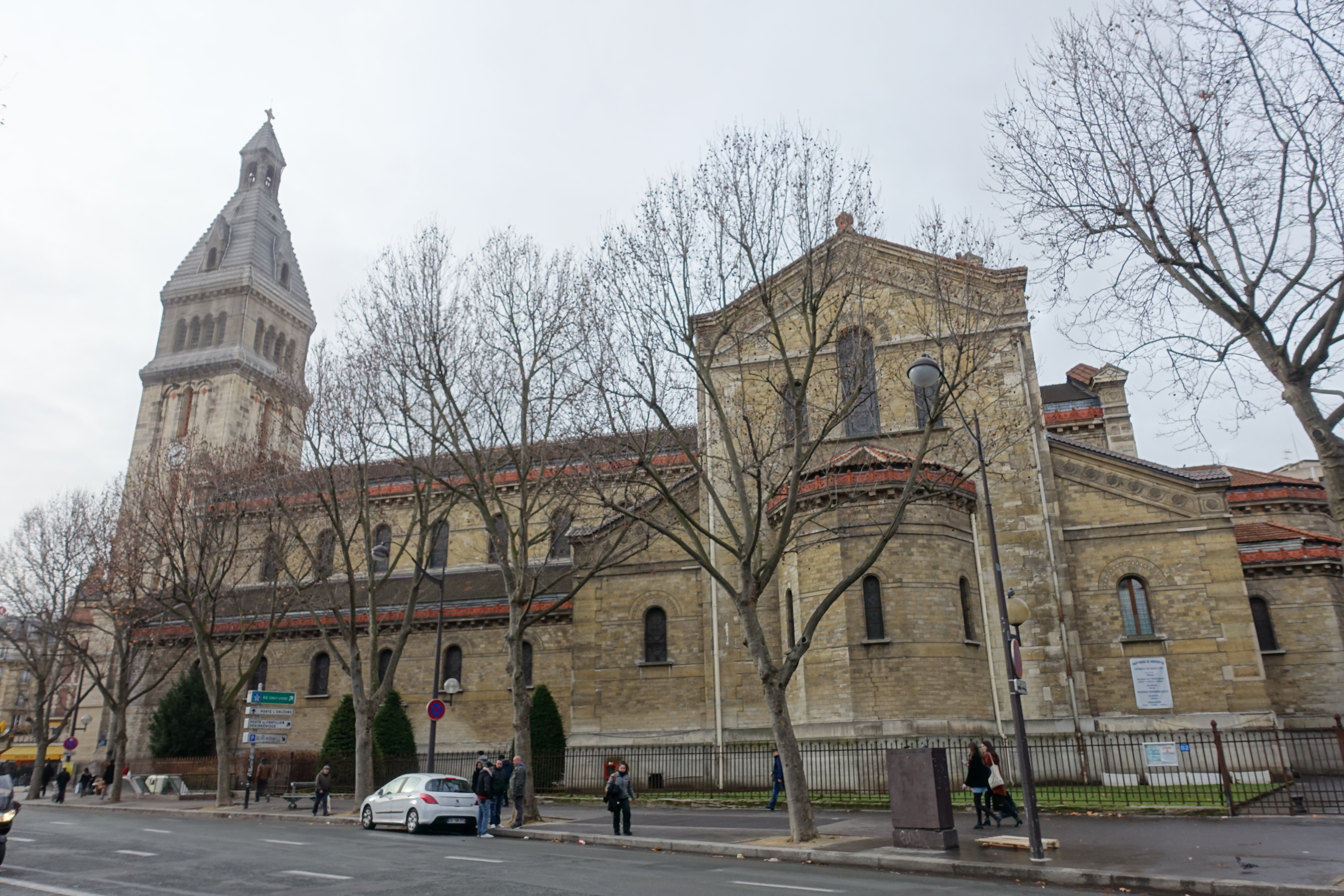
The nave and transept

Vaudremer built the church on a triangular site, with the portal at the point of the triangle. The portal, in the Neo-Classical style, has a rounded arch, and is surmounted by the bell tower. The church follows a standard basilica model, with a nave, separated from the two side aisles by arcades of columns with Corinthian capitals.

The eastern portion of the church is more elaborate, with a large transept flanked by small chapels, and another chapel, flanked by two smaller chapels, which extends the longitudinal axis.

he crossing of the transept is preceded by a large triumphal arch, and is topped by a lantern-tower. Within the church transept is a large Ciborium, or altar canopy, supported by columns, and on top is a lantern tower.

== Interior ==
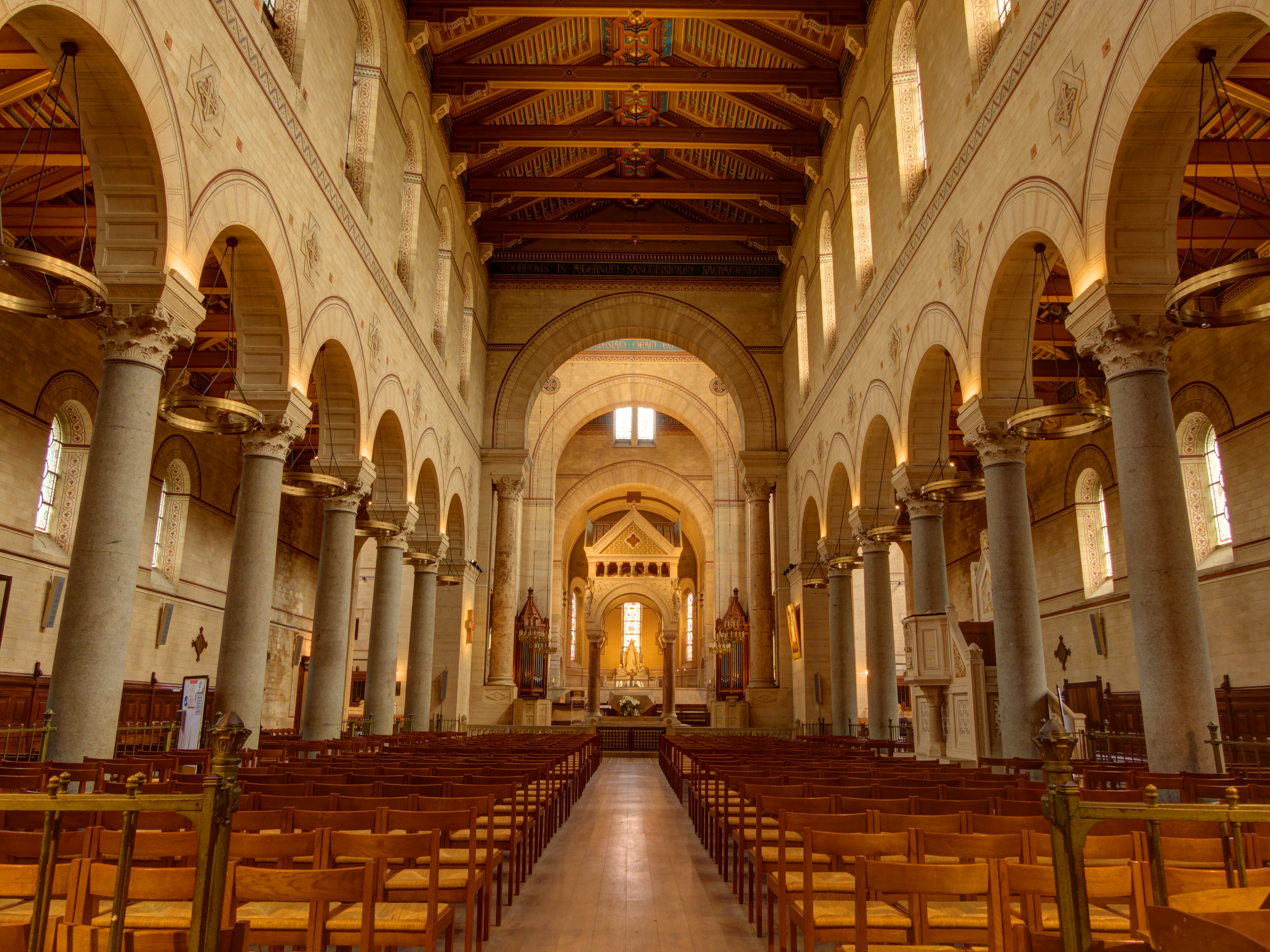
The nave facing the choir

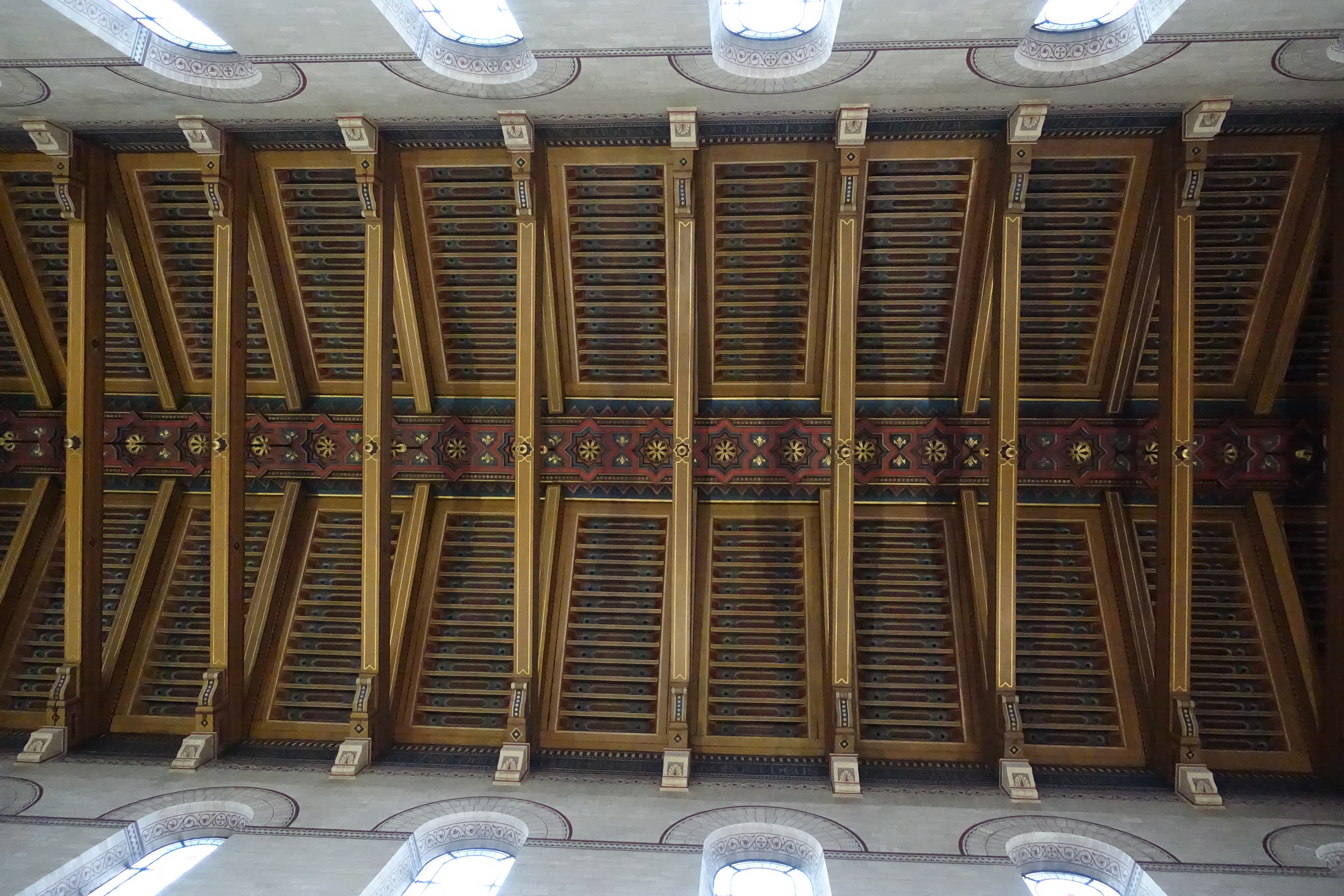
The nave ceiling

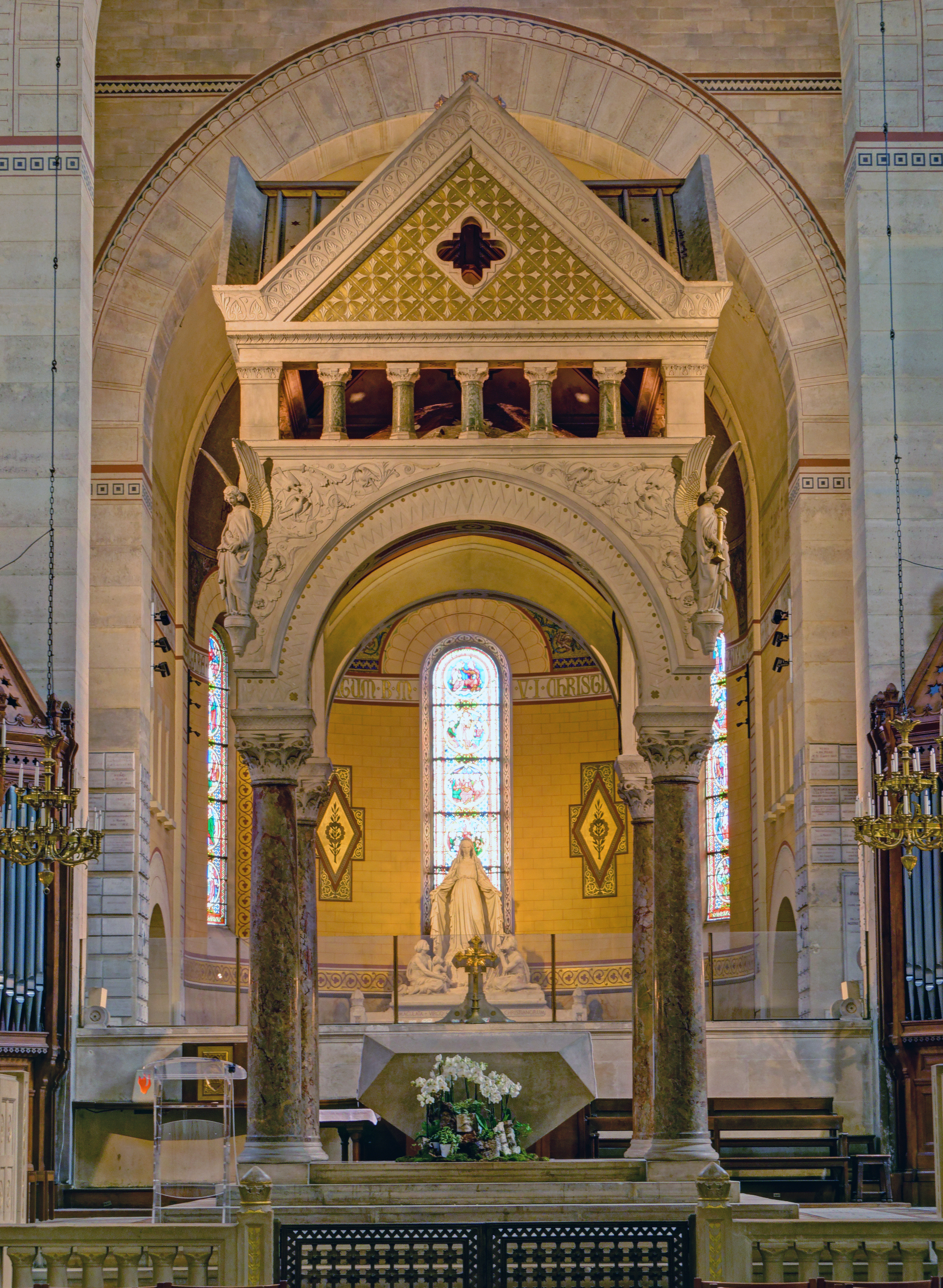
The Ciborium in front of the altar, with statues of angels on the corners

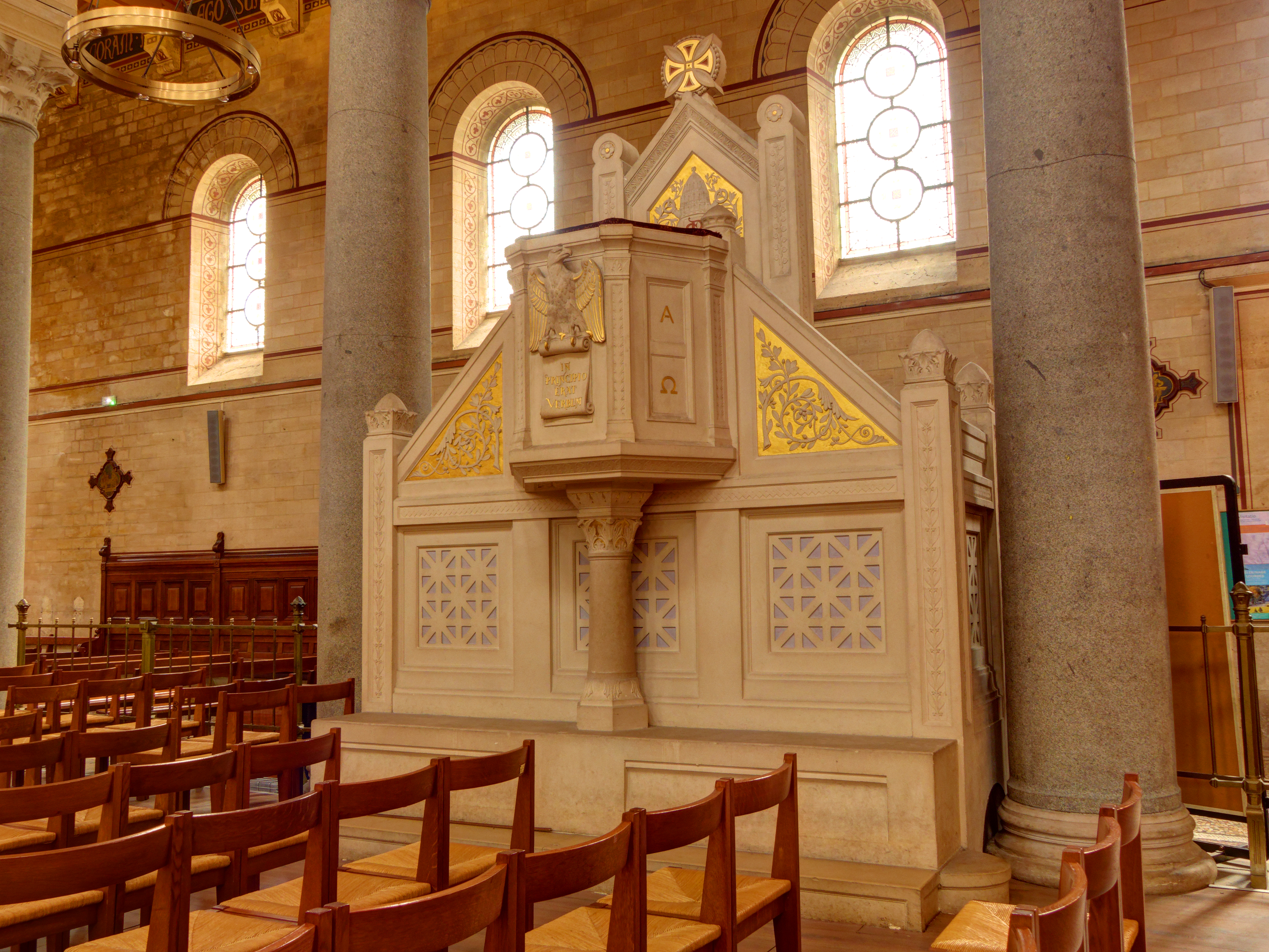
the pulpit

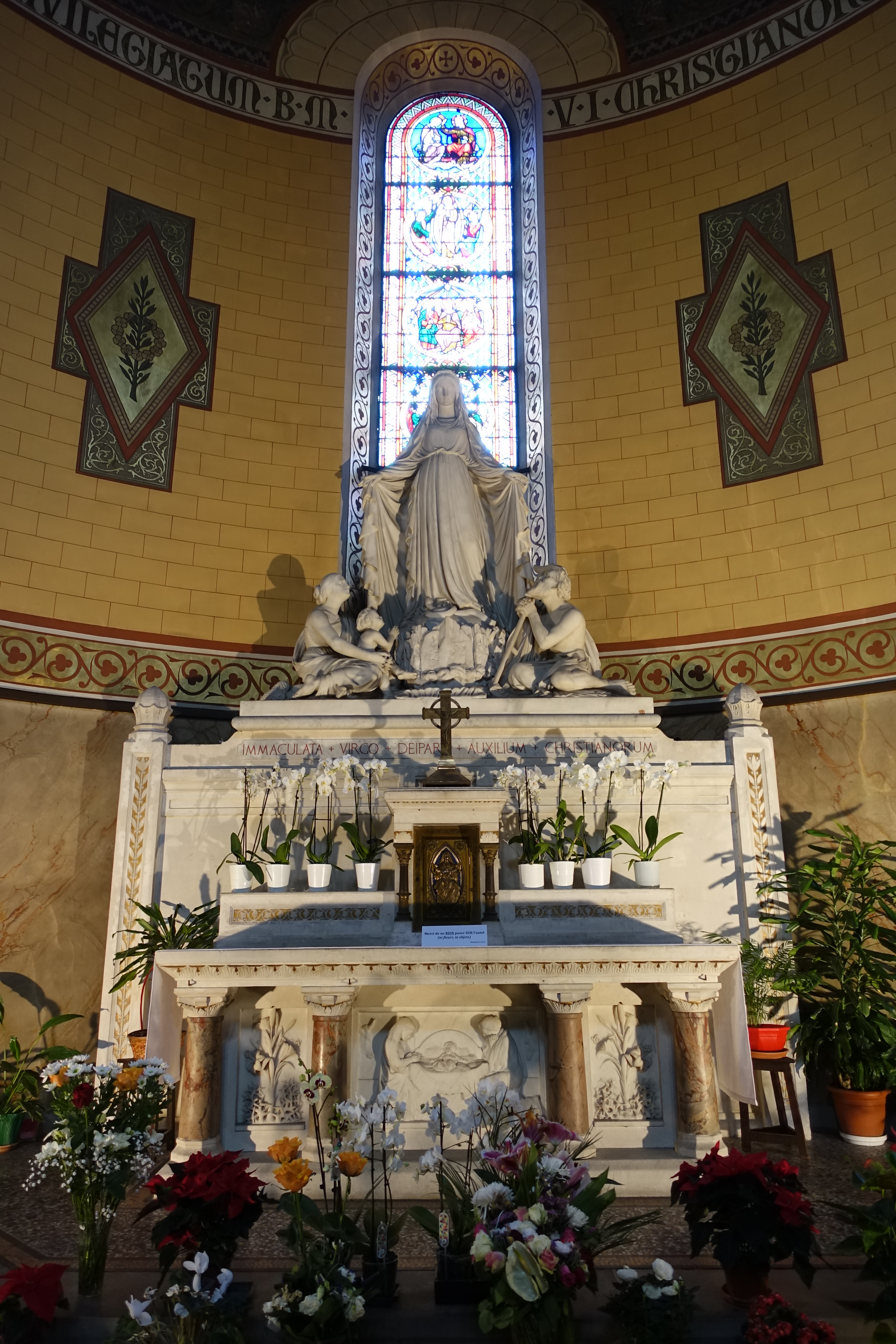
Chapel of the Virgin

The church has an abundance of paintings, frescos, sculpture and stained glass made by Paris artists of the period, particularly since the church was sponsored by the Emperor Louis-Napoleon. The entrance is flanked on the west by baptismal fonts, and by a statue of Saint Peter. The insides of the cupolas are decorated with paintings; Christ is shown on the chapel axis, together with Saint Joseph and Saint John.

The four corners of the transept display statues of saints.:

-On the east are two saints connected with the history of France; Saint Louis and Saint Joan of Arc.

-On the west are two saints connected with the history of the Christian church in Paris; Saint Denis, the first Bishop of Lutece and a martyr, and Saint Genevieve, who rallied the Parisians to fight the Huns led by Attila.

The pose and the tympanum are decorated with frescos by Euuene Capelle, and stained glass windows made by Gaspoard Gsell and Emmile Lauirent.

== Stained glass ==
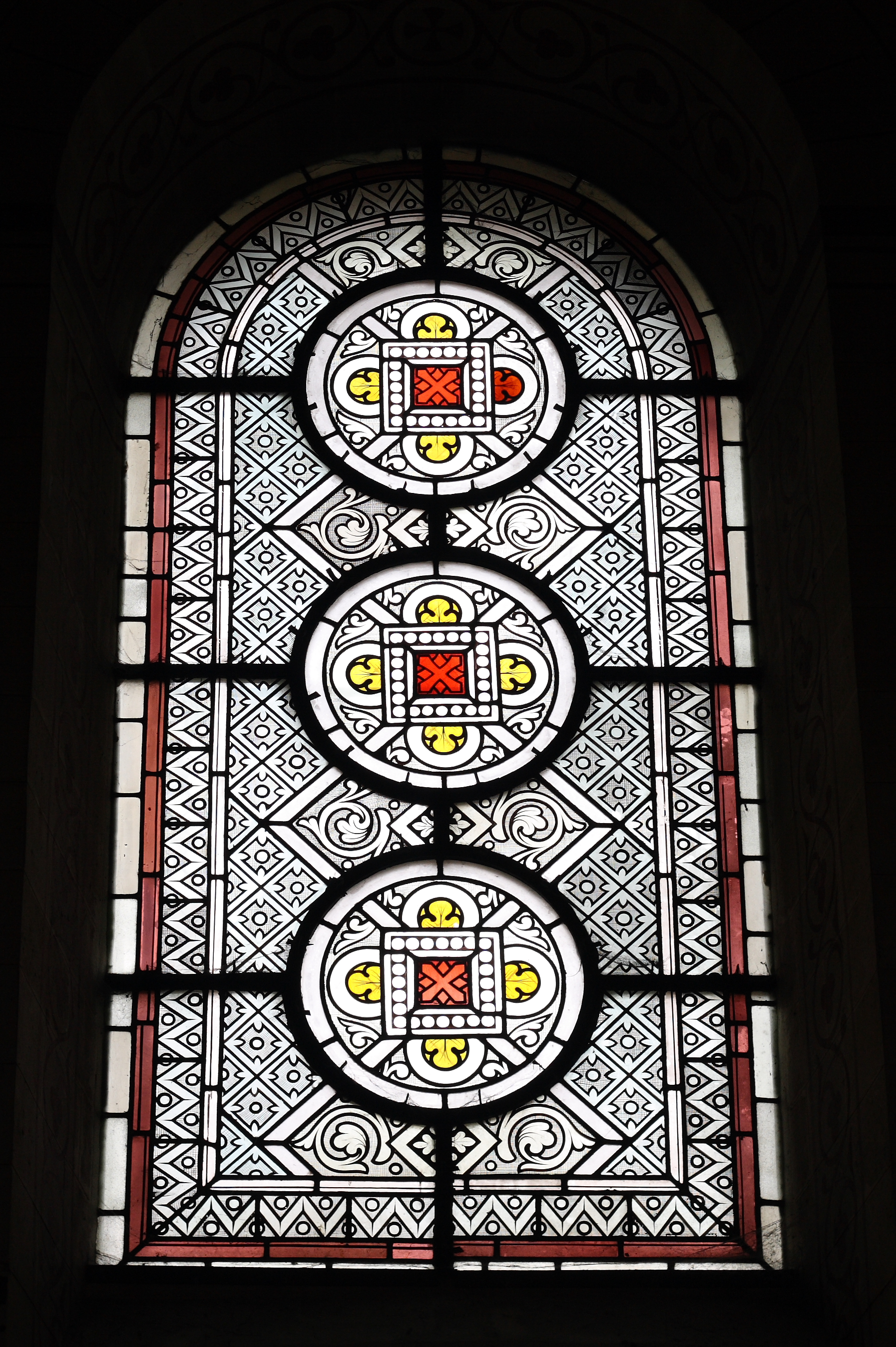
Abstract window

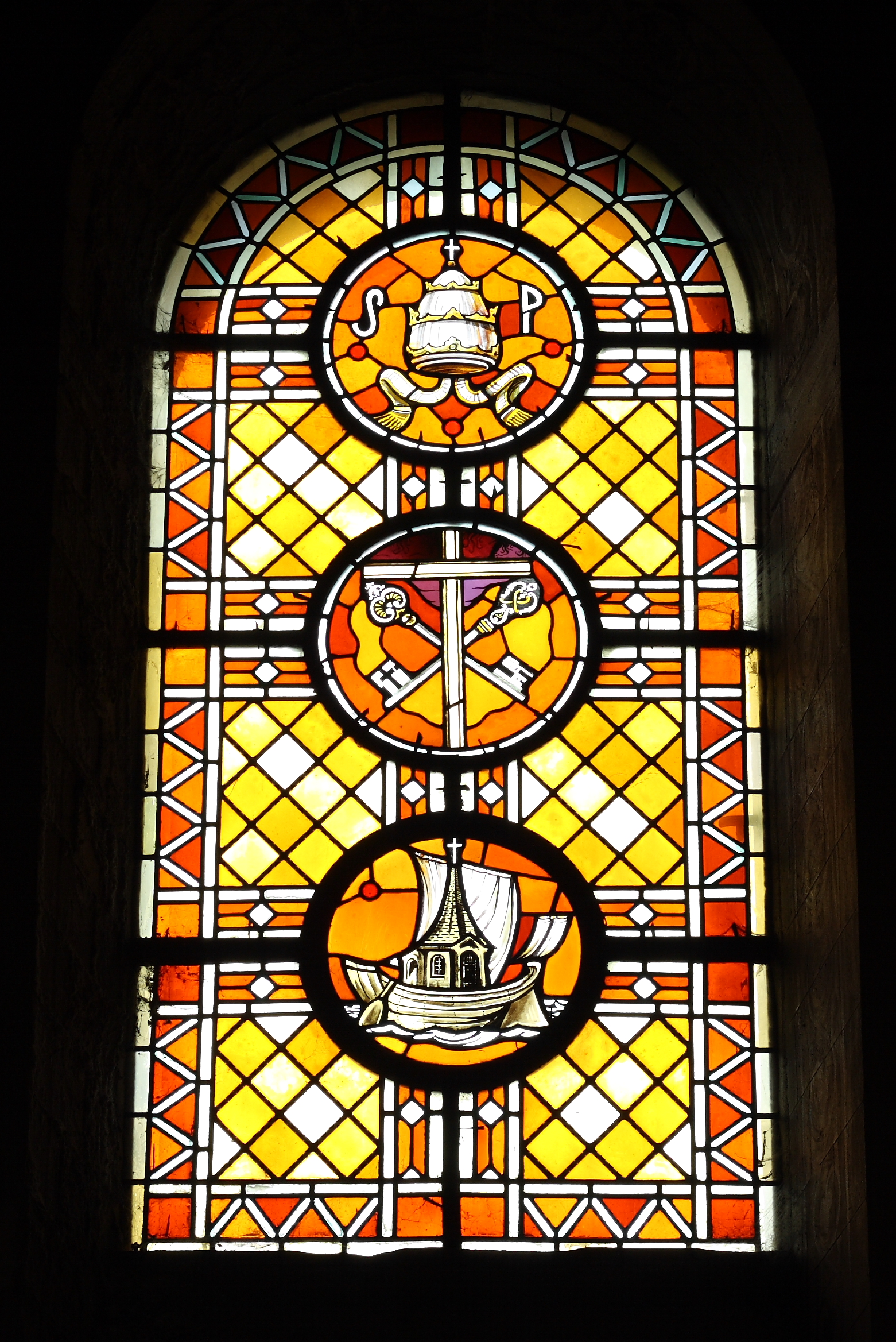
Symbols of Saint Peter

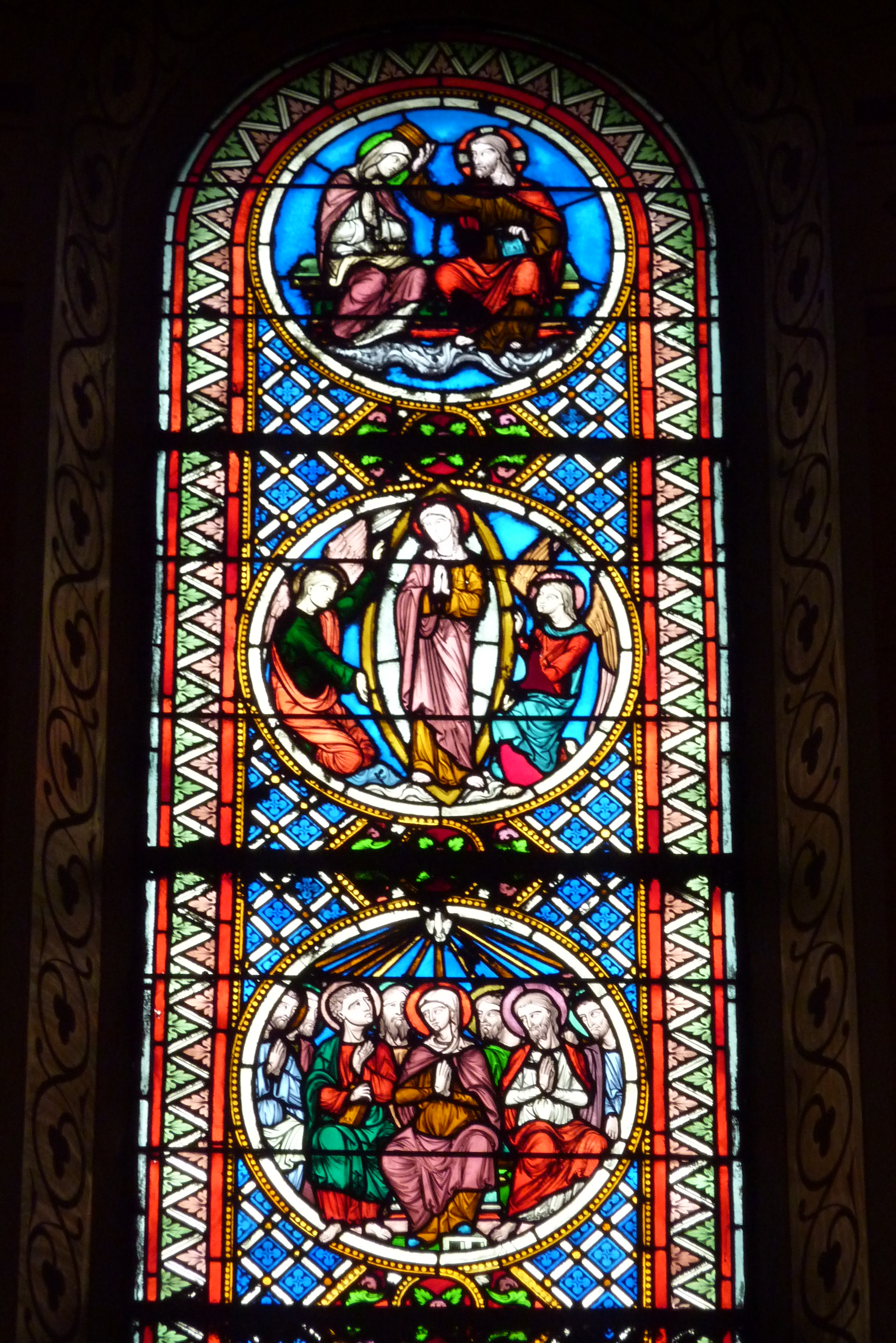
Scenes from the life of the Virgin Mary

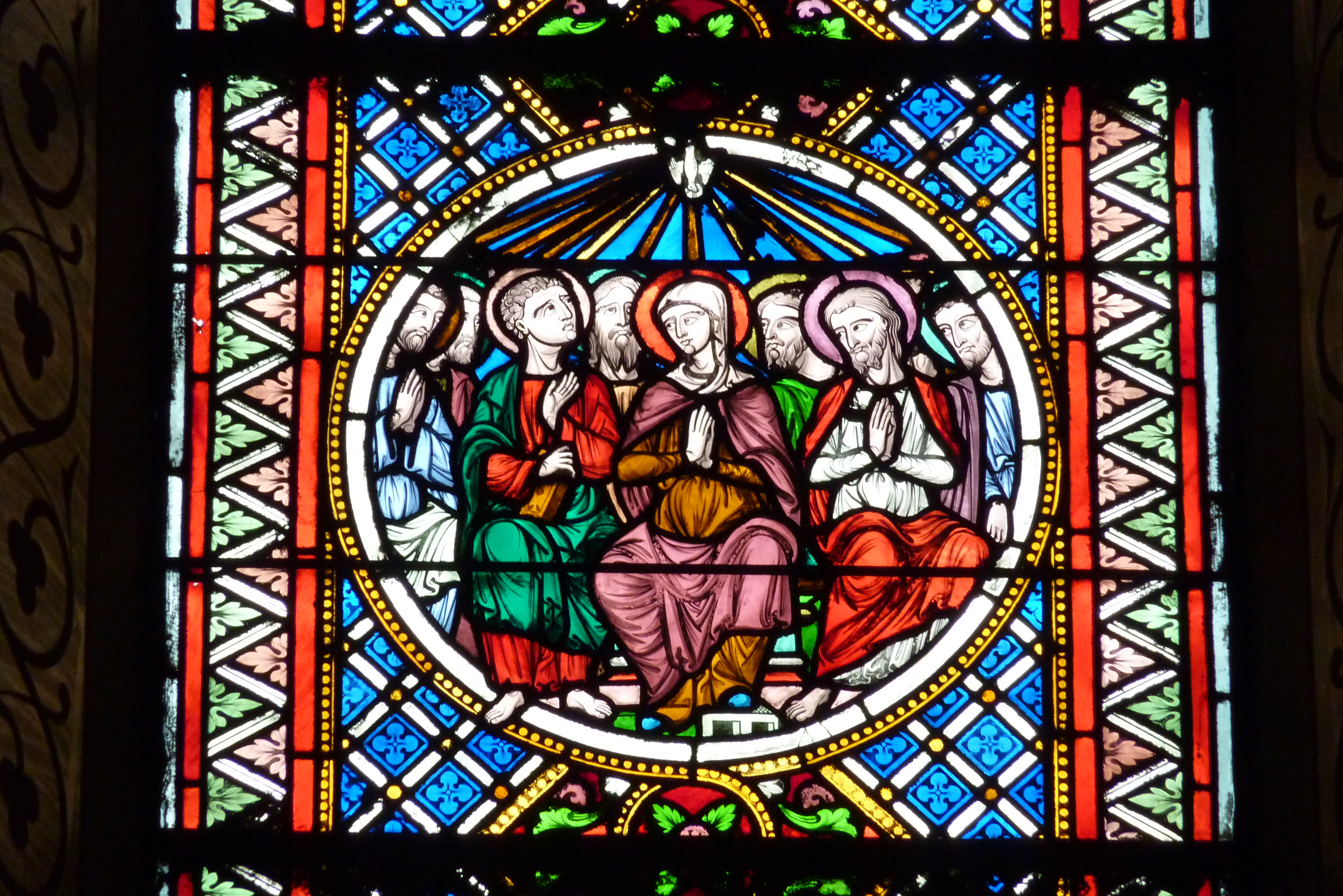
Mary and the Apostles

The upper windows of the nave feature geometric designs in grisaille glass, to provide abundant light to highlight the decoration of the ceiling and the interior. They were made in the 19th century by the workshop of Gsell and Laurent.

== The Organ ==
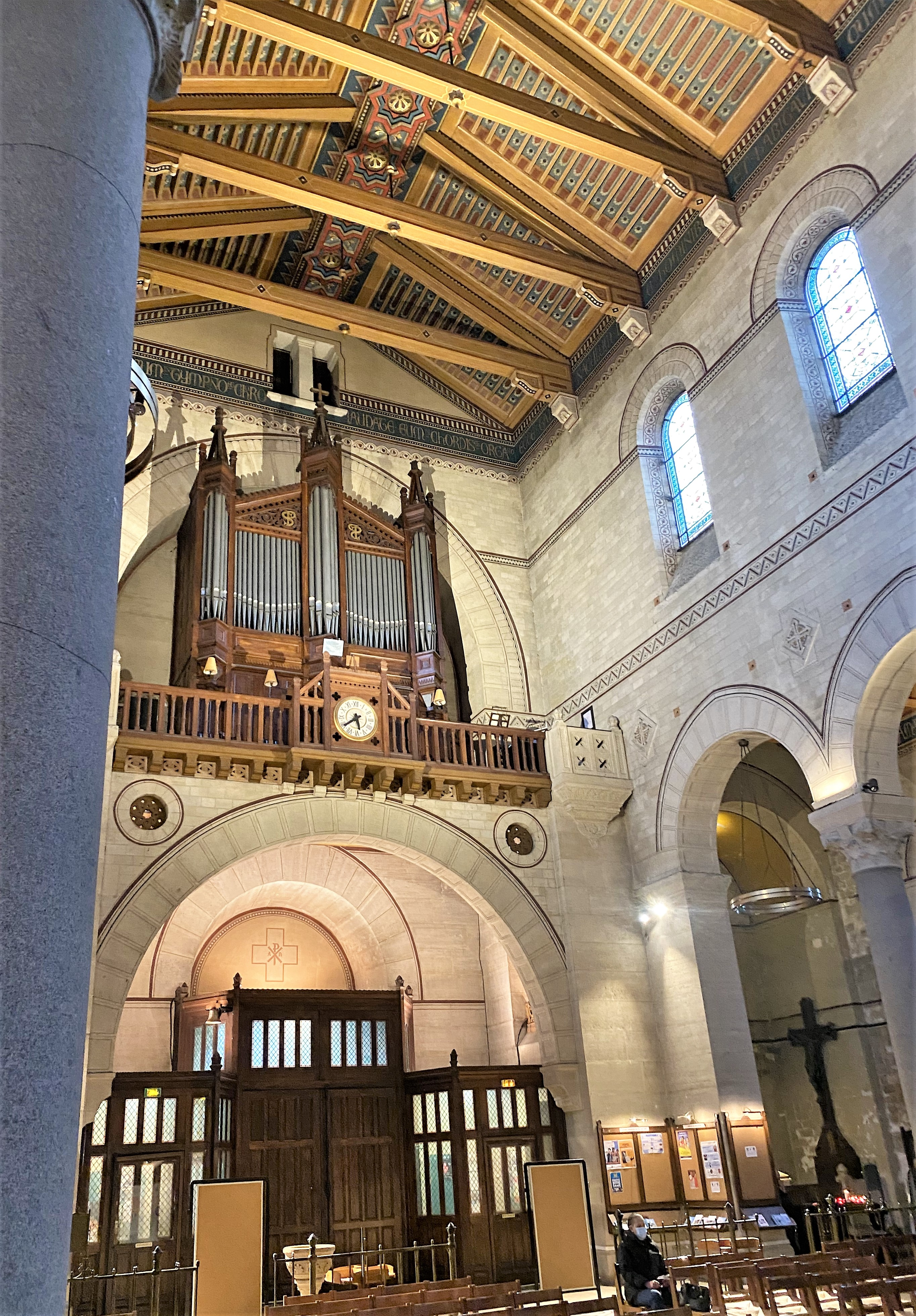
The grand organ in the tribune

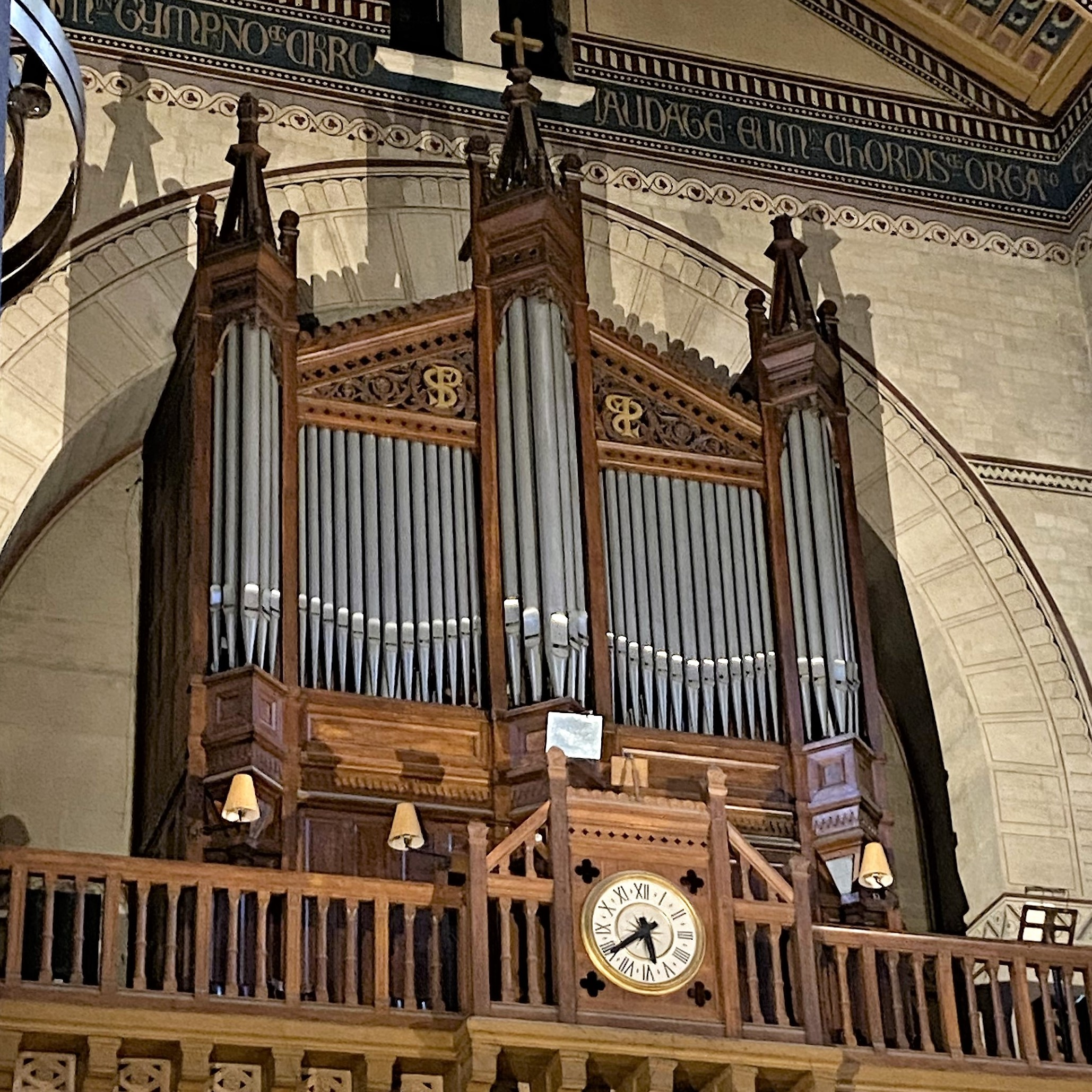
The grand organ

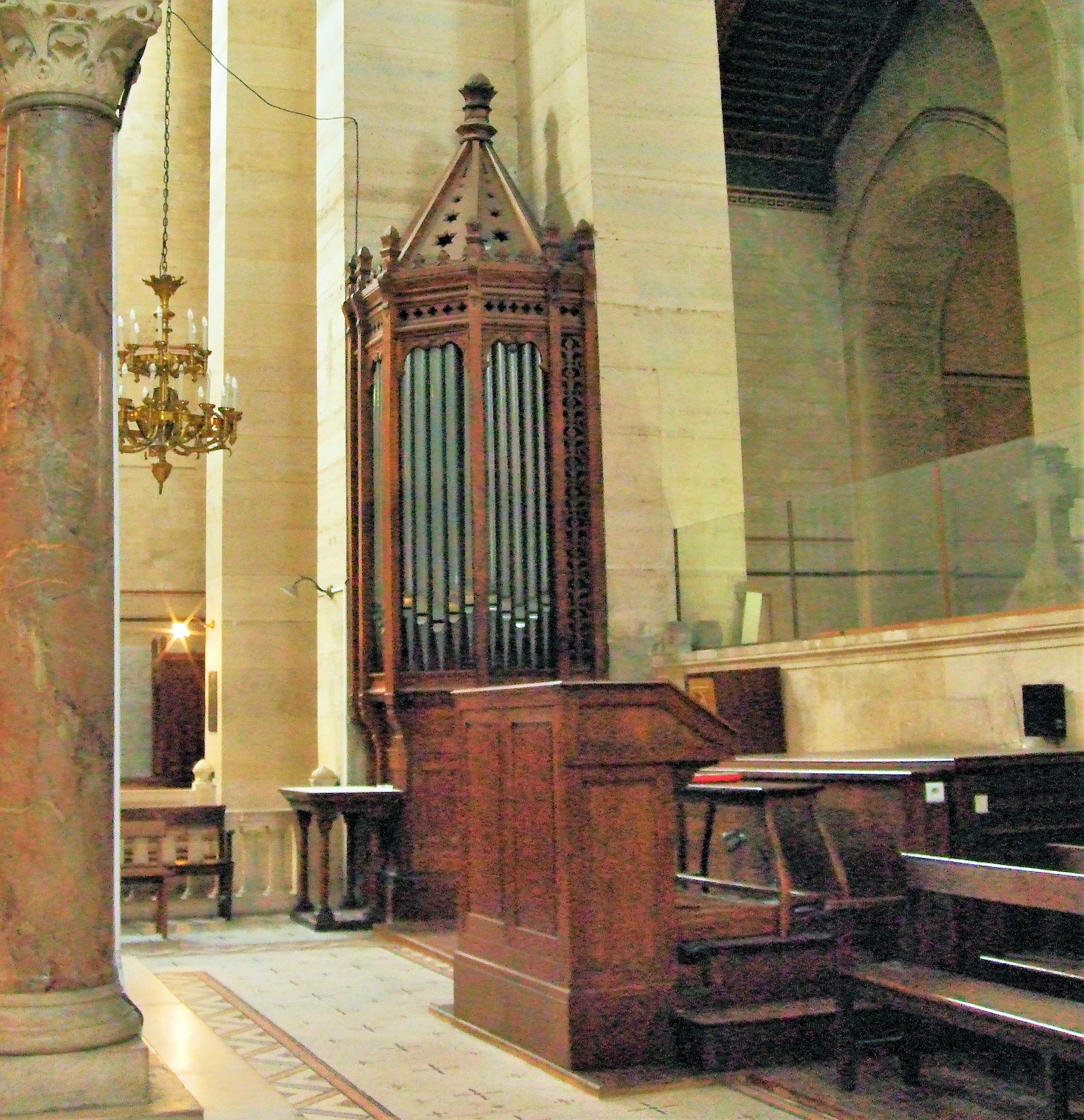
the choir organ

The grand organ in the tribune over the entrance to the nave was built in 1868 by Barker, and underwent a series of modifications in Joseph Merkin in 1892, Gutschenritter in 1917, 1924 and 2935, and Beuchet-Debierre in 1951. The organ in the tribune and keyboard are connected electronically. A smaller organ is located in the choir.
