= Agoraios =

Agoraios or Agoraeus can refer to several things:

- Agoraeus, an epithet of several gods of Greek mythology
  - Altar of Zeus Agoraios
- Agoraios Kolonos, in ancient times a meeting place for Athenian craftsmen
