= Ancient Agora of Athens =

Square of ancient Athens

- Αρχαία Αγορά της Αθήνας (Ancient Greek)
- Classical Agora
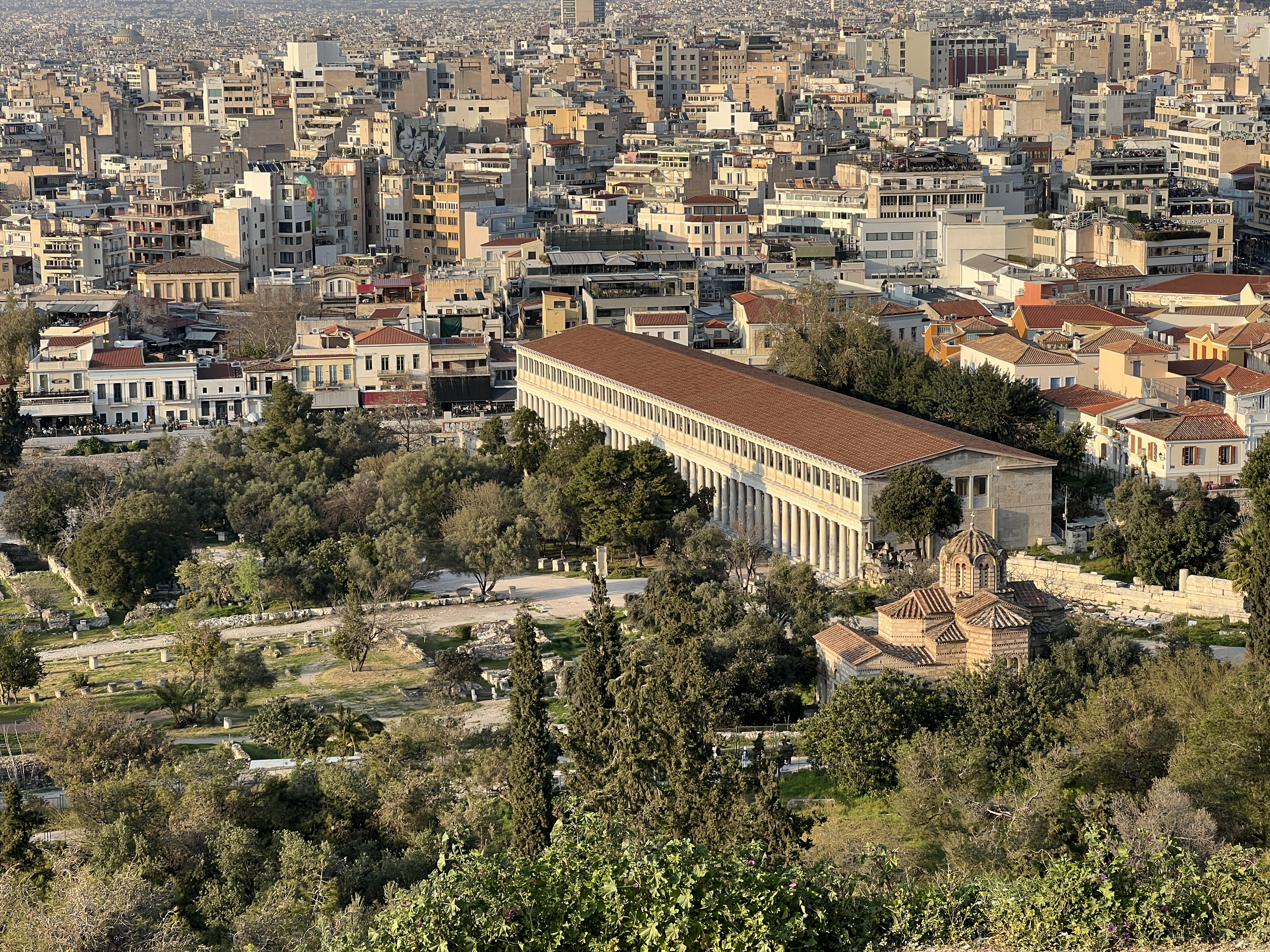

- Central Athens
- 37°58′30″N 23°43′21″E
- Periods: Classical era
- Cultures: Ancient Greece
- Location: Greece
- Region: Attica

History
- Built: 6th century BC

Site notes
- Material: Marble
- Excavation dates: 1931–present
- Archaeologists: American School of Classical Studies at Athens
- Condition: Ruined
- Owner: Public property
- Management: Minister for Culture
- Public access: Yes

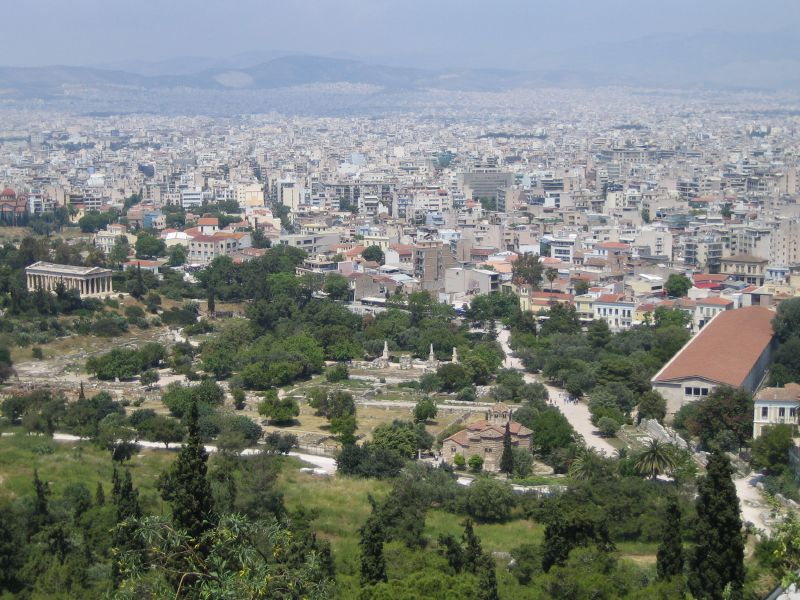
View of the ancient agora. The temple of Hephaestus is to the left and the Stoa of Attalos to the right.

The Ancient Agora of Athens (also called the Classical Agora) is an ancient Greek agora. It is located to the northwest of the Acropolis, and bounded on the south by the hill of the Areopagus and on the west by the hill known as the Agoraios Kolonos, also called Market Hill. The Agora's initial use was for a commercial, assembly, or residential gathering place.

== Buildings and structures of the classical agora ==
Plan of the Agora at the end of the Classical Period (ca. 300 BC).

Plan of the Ancient Agora of Athens in the Roman Imperial period (ca. 150 AD).

=== North side of the agora ===
- Stoa Poikile (Painted stoa), a building built in the 5th century B.C. used purely for socialising unlike many other buildings in the agora.
- Altar of the Twelve Gods
- Stoa Basileios (Royal stoa)
- Temple of Aphrodite Urania
- The south end of what is believed to be a Basilica has been uncovered near Hadrian Street and is dated to the mid 100s C.E.

=== East side of the agora ===
- The Stoa of Attalos, a stoa lined with shops built in the 2nd century B.C. which has since been reconstructed for use as the Museum of The Ancient Agora.
- The Square Peristyle was a law court originally located under the northern end of the Stoa of Attalos.
- A collection of buildings were added to the south-east corner: the East stoa, the Library of Pantainos, the Nymphaeum and a temple.
- The Library of Pantainos was more than just a library, the west and north wings were series of rooms that were used for other purposes other than storing books. With the construction of the Library of Pantainos, the official entrance into the agora was now between the Library and the Stoa of Attalos.
- The Mint, a building which was used for the minting of bronze coinage in the 2nd and 3rd centuries B.C. but there is no evidence for it being used for the minting of Athenian silver coinage.
- The Monopteros was located south of the Basilica and also dated to the mid 100s C.E. It had no walls, was a dome supported by columns and was about 8 meters in diameter.
- The Bema was a speakers platform and was located near the Stoa of Attalos.

=== South side of the agora ===
- The Middle stoa which was the most extensive monument built during the 2nd century B.C.
- The Southwest Temple, built with material from Thorikos in the early first century AD.
- South-east Fountain House
- South Stoa I
- Aiakeion

=== West side of the agora ===
- Strategeion
- Tholos
- Boundary stone
- Monument of the Eponymous Heroes, a monument for the ten heroes of the tribes of Athens which was also used as a notice board for new legislation, public events and military conscription.
- Metroon (Old Bouleuterion)
- Bouleuterion
- Temple of Apollo Patroos and the Temple of Zeus Phratrios and Athena Phratria.
- Stoa of Zeus

=== Other monuments ===
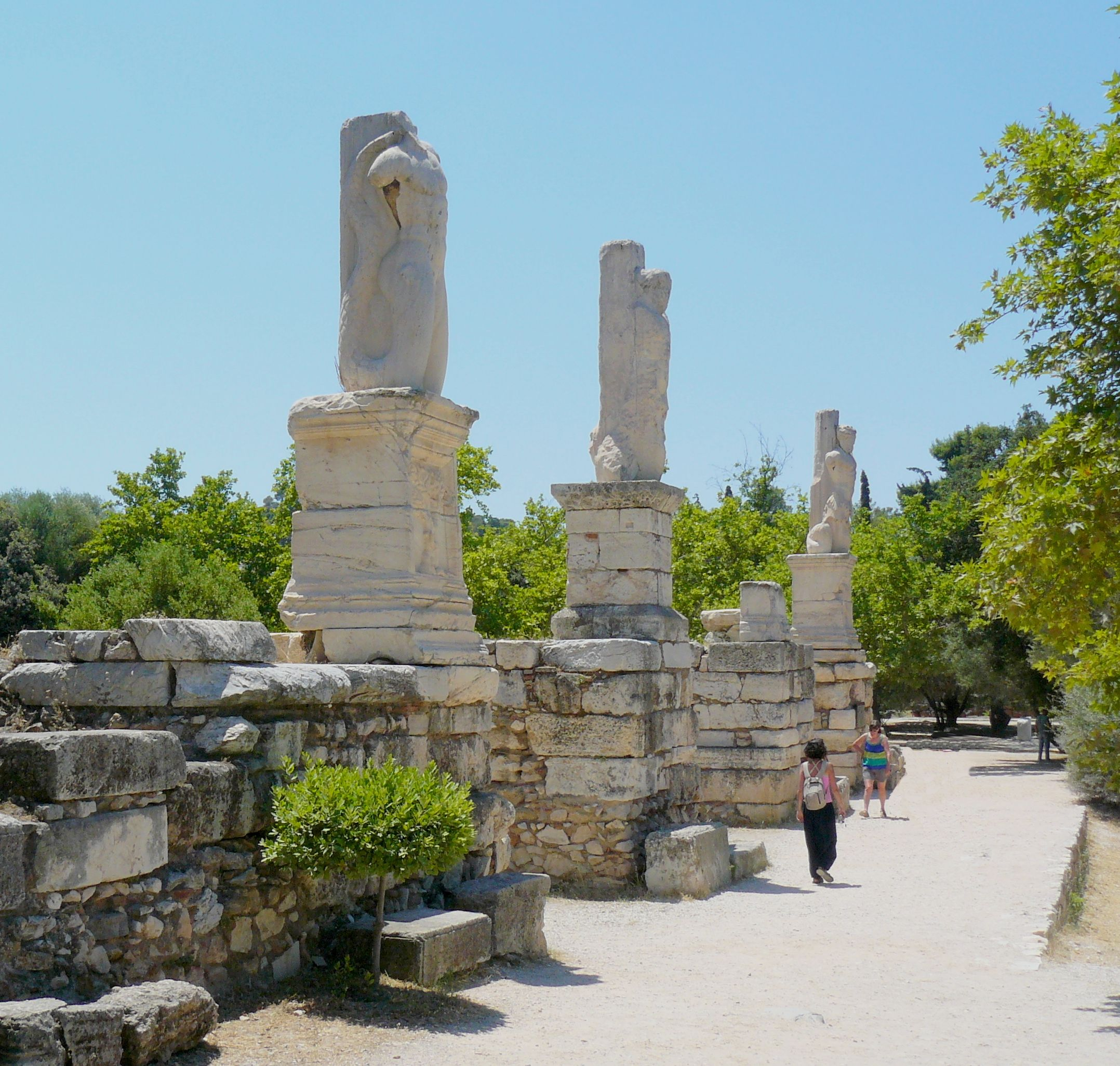
The entrance to the Odeon of Agrippa

A number of other notable monuments were added to the agora. Some of these included:

- An Altar of Zeus Agoraios was added just to the east of the Monument to the Eponymous Heroes.
- The Temple of Ares, dedicated to Ares, the god of war, was added in the north half of the agora, just south of the Altar of the Twelve Gods.
- The Odeon of Agrippa and accompanying gymnasium were added in the centre of the agora.
- There is evidence of a Synagogue in the Agora of Athens in the 3rd century.

== Women's roles in the Athenian Agora ==
=== Professions ===
In the 5th and 4th centuries BC, there was significant evidence of women being innkeepers and merchants selling their products in the market of the Athenian agora. Some of the products they sold included fruits, clothes, pottery, religious and luxury goods, perfume, incense, purple dye, wreaths, and ribbons.

=== Rituals ===
The Athenian calendar boasted several religious festivals that were held in the Athenian agora. These festivals were significant as they provided Ancient Athenian women with the opportunity to socialize outside of the home. Additionally, some of these festivals were performed by women; these duties included officiating the worship of goddess Athena, patron goddess of the city. Performing these rituals for goddesses was a prerequisite for the daughters of aristocratic families. Women of all ranks and classes could be seen making offerings at the small shrines in the agora. Some women also set up substantial memorials to their piety within the agora. Religious festivals were a significant opportunity for the women of Athens to participate in their social culture.

== Marble-workers in the Athenian Agora ==
As of the early 5th century, the Ancient Agora of Athens was known as glorious and richly decorated, set with famous works of art, many of them sculpted from marble. The buildings of the Athenian Agora had marble decoration and housed dedications in the form of marble statues. Finds from the agora excavations identified that generations of marble-workers made the agora of Athens an important center for the production of marble sculptures. Marble-workers made sculptures, marble weights, sundials, furniture parts, and an assortment of kitchen utensils. Excavations of the Athenian agora revealed the remains of many marble-working establishments, various unfinished statues, reliefs, and utilitarian objects.

=== Marble workshops in the Agora ===
Excavations of the Athenian agora have proved that marble-workers were very active, the earliest workshops being established in the early 5th century. The earliest areas used by marble workers were the residential and industrial districts southwest of the agora. Another area where marble-workers set up shop was in the South Square, after the sack of Athens by the Roman general Sulla in 86 BC. As the South Square was in ruins, marble-workers were attracted to the remains of the marble temples. A workshop from the southern corner of the agora was also important, the Library of Pantainos rented out rooms to marble-workers.

=== Famous marble-workers in the Agora ===
Literacy and evidence from excavations give a sense of statues and famous marble sculptors in the Athenian agora. These famous marble-workers of the Agora include, the 5th-century master Phidias and his associate Alkamenes, and the 4th-century sculptors Praxiteles, Bryaxis, and Euphranor.

==== Phidias ====
Phidias was the most well known marble-worker to have worked in the agora. He was famous for his gold and ivory cult statue of Zeus at Olympia, and for his three lost sculptures of Athena.

==== Alcamenes ====
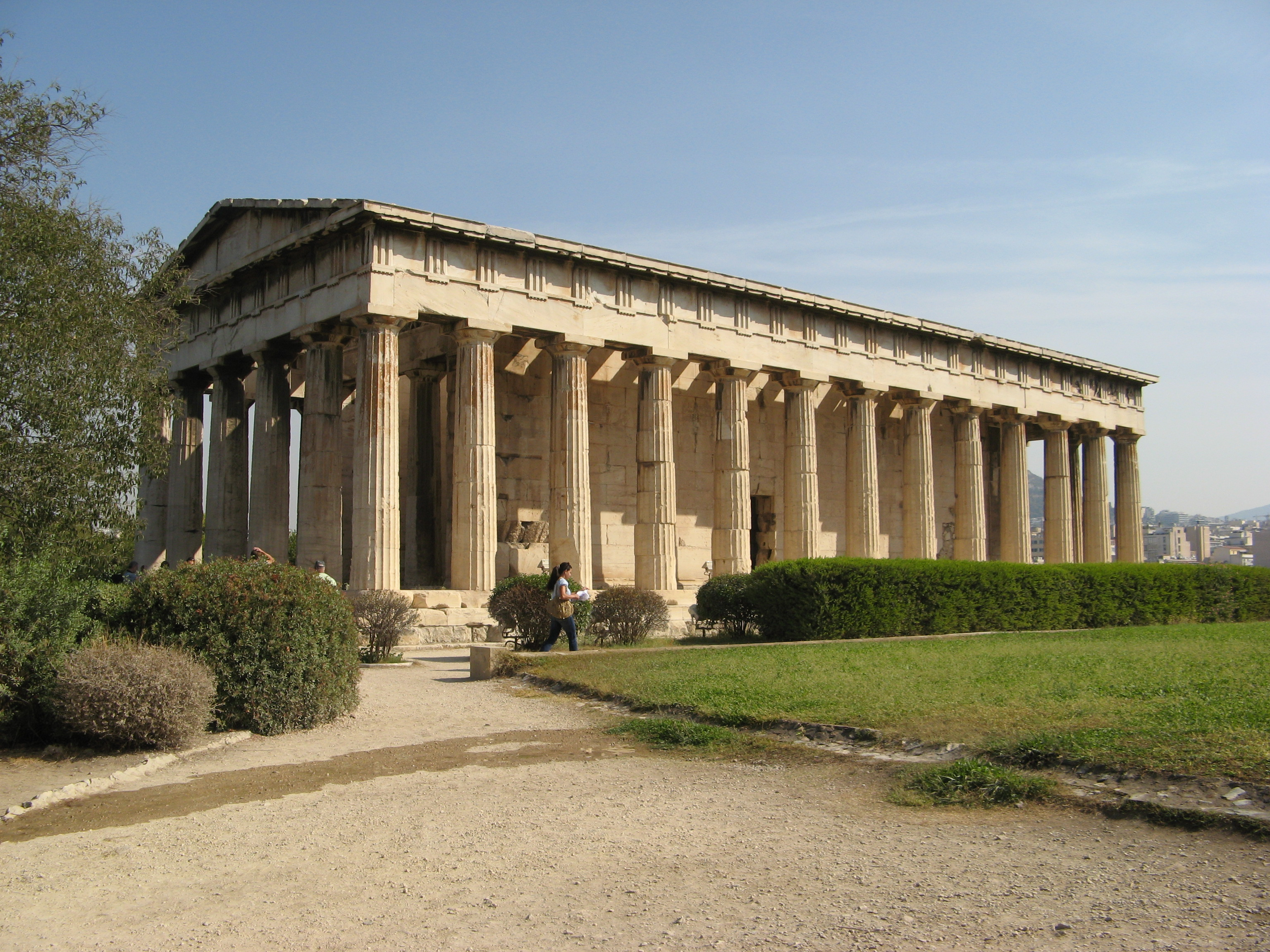
The Temple of Hephaestus

A well-known associate of Phidias was Alcamenes, whose most important works in the agora were the bronze cult statues of Hephaestus and Athena in the Temple of Hephaestus.

==== Praxiteles and Bryaxis ====
These famous sculptors are attested in the agora by the discovery of signed pieces of work that could no longer be preserved. A marble statue signed and possibly carved by Bryaxis was found in the agora behind the Royal Stoa.

==== Euphranor ====
The 4th century marble-worker known for his sculptures, made a colossal statue of Apollo for the Temple of Apollo Patroos on the west side of the agora.

== Excavations ==
=== Early explorations and excavations ===
Between 1851 and 1852, the Archaeological Society of Athens (a learned society with a prominent role in the excavation and conservation of ancient monuments) undertook excavations in the neighbourhood of Vrysaki (later discovered to be the area of the Agora), in the courtyard of a house (known as the "Psoma House") owned by Louisa Psoma. The excavation was intended to uncover the remains of the Bouleuterion (the ancient city's assembly building) and the temples known as the Metroon and the Tholos, and required the Archaeological Society to sell shares in the National Bank of Greece worth 12,000 drachmas (Note: Approximately equivalent to €72,400 in 2023, based on conversion rates in Bikelas, Demetrius (1868). "Statistics of the Kingdom of Greece". Journal of the Statistical Society of London. 31 (3): 265–298. doi:10.2307/2338853. ISSN 0959-5341. JSTOR 2338853..) to buy the plot. Pittakis led the excavation, assisted by the society's archaeologists Panagiotis Efstratiadis and D. Charamis. Although the excavation furnished several ancient inscriptions, published by Efstratiadis in three volumes, it failed to uncover the promised ancient monuments; the archaeologist Konstantinos Kouroniotis found in 1910 that the antiquities discovered at the house were associated with the late Roman walls of the city. Further excavations were undertaken by Wilhelm Dörpfeld, the director of the German Archaeological Institute at Athens (DAI), in 1882–1888, to locate the ancient Agora on the western slope of the Acropolis and on the Areopagus hill; the DAI undertook further excavations in the Agora area in 1895–1896, while the Archaeological Society of Athens made more explorations in 1907–1908 with the same goal.

In 1924, a bill was presented to the Hellenic Parliament for the expropriation of properties in Vrysaki to allow the excavation of the Agora, but it was defeated. The government attempted to persuade the Greek Archaeological Service to find the necessary funds, but it became clear that only the foreign archaeological institutes would be able to raise sufficient capital, and of these only the American School of Classical Studies at Athens (ASCSA) took interest in the project. The ASCSA's control of the excavation was negotiated by the Edward Capps, whom the school would honor with a memorial overlooking the project. In 1930, the ASCSA appointed T. Leslie Shear, then director of its work at Corinth, to lead the excavation. Although the initial plan was for Shear to serve as the project's field director, under Rhys Carpenter as general director, Carpenter was never appointed, and Shear had total control over the excavations. Shear arranged for the photographic documentation of Vrysaki, which was to be demolished in the course of the project, under the excavation's photographer, Hermann Wagner, and a Greek photographer named Messinesi.

=== The beginning of the ASCSA excavations, 1931–1940 ===
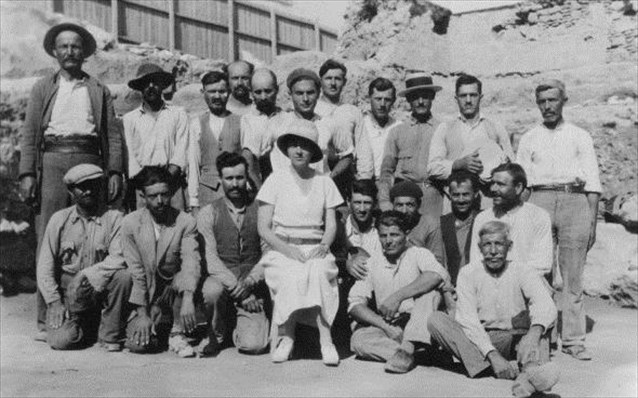
Dorothy Burr with her Greek excavation crew at the Athenian Agora, 1933

The Agora excavations became one of the largest archaeological projects in Greece. They were largely funded by the financier John D. Rockefeller Jr., and secured through American loans to Greece. Staff on the project included Homer A. Thompson, Eugene Vanderpool, Benjamin Meritt, Dorothy Burr, Virginia Grace, Lucy Talcott, Alison Frantz, Piet de Jong and John Travlos, all of whom were or became noted figures in Greek archaeology. Shear's wife, Josephine Platner Shear, supervised the digging and led the study and conservation of numismatics from the site, as well as making the discovery of a new 2nd-century CE Athenian coin.

The first season, in 1931, consisted only of minor exploratory work. The 1932 season was more substantial; excavation was conducted for a period of six months. The work uncovered the Stoa Basileios, the Agora's Great Drain, and the Stoa of Zeus Eleutherios, as well as a statue of the Roman emperor Hadrian believed to be that described by Pausanias as standing in front of the latter building. During the 1933 season, which ran from February to July, parts of the Bouleuterion were uncovered, as well as inscriptions placing the Metroon in the area south and east of the Stoa Basileios, and parts of the late Roman Valerian Wall. In the excavation season between January 22 and May 12, 1934, the project uncovered the Tholos, secured the location of the Bouleuterion and the Metroon, and discovered the Temple of Apollo Patroos and the Altar of the Twelve Gods. The 1935 season closed on June 29: by this point, around half of the site had been cleared, and the total discoveries included almost 600 items of sculpture, over 6,000 pieces of pottery, and over 41,000 coins.

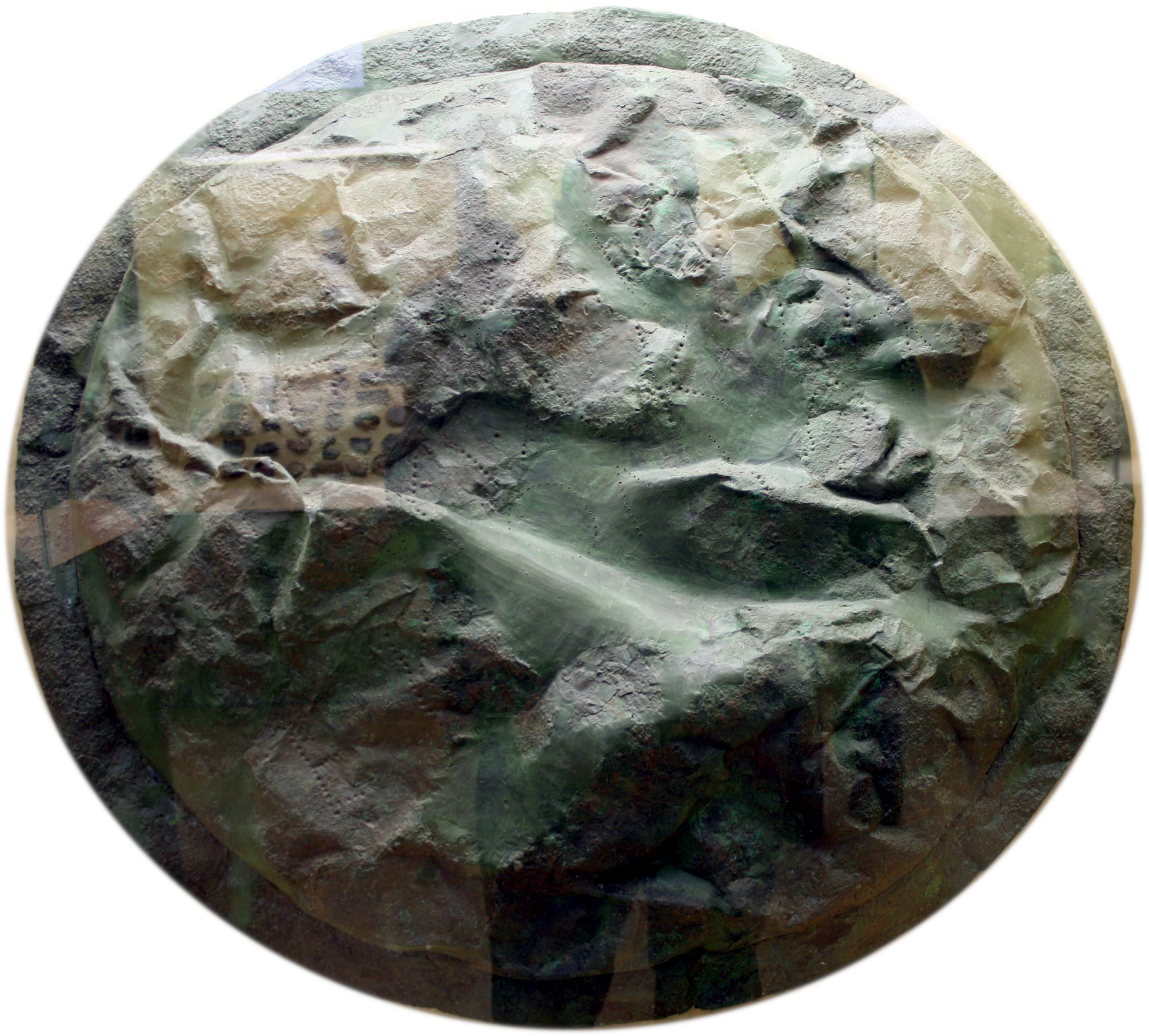
The shield, found in 1936, originally taken by the Athenians from the Spartans after the Battle of Pylos in 425 BCE

By the 1936 season, which ran between January 27 and June 13, the excavations were conducted over eight different locations. This campaign uncovered the Odeon of Agrippa and a fountain-house identified as the Enneakrounos, as well as parts of the Monument to the Tyrannicides and a shield taken as plunder after the Battle of Pylos in 425 BCE. Between January 25 and June 1937, the ASCSA excavated around the Temple of Hephaestus, determining the date of the Valerian Wall and uncovering the location and footprint of the Temple of Ares, as well as several items of Early and Middle Helladic pottery. In the 1938 season, between January 24 and June 18, the course of the Panathenaic Way was plotted, allowing the full boundaries of the Agora to be established.

Shear expected the 1939 season to be the last major campaign of digging required, and during it 56,000 tons of earth were cleared, more than in any other year. The excavations largely concentrated on the lower slope of the Areopagus hill, where a Mycenaean chamber tomb believed by to have been built by one of the Kings of Athens was uncovered. Ground was also cleared for the construction of a new museum, under the direction of Rodney Young, but was delayed by Young's discovery of ancient tombs in the area. These tombs were further investigated during a five-week campaign in 1940. During that season, preparations were made for the excavations to be halted for the Second World War: artefacts were handed over to the Greek government, and records were photographed and then placed in a bomb-proof shelter.

=== After 1945 ===
John McK. Camp served as Director of the excavations since 1994, until his retirement in 2022. John K. Papadopoulos is now in the position of Director following Camp's retirement.

After the initial phase of excavation, in the 1950s the Hellenistic Stoa of Attalos was reconstructed on the east side of the agora, and today it serves as a museum and as storage and office space for the excavation team.

A virtual reconstruction of the Ancient Agora of Athens has been produced through a collaboration of the American School of Classical Studies at Athens and the Foundation of the Hellenic World, which had various output (3d video, VR real-time dom performance, and Google Earth 3d models).

During a 1974 excavation, a lead tablet was discovered. The tablet was a letter written by Lesis, a slave. It was one of the few recorded instances of slave literacy.

=== Flora ===
Evidence of planting was discovered during the excavations and on 4 January 1954, the first oak and laurel trees were planted around the Altar of Zeus by Queen Frederika and King Paul as part of the efforts to restore the site with plants that would have been found there in antiquity.

== Museum of the Ancient Agora ==
The museum is housed in the Stoa of Attalos, and its exhibits are connected with Athenian democracy. The collection of the museum includes clay, bronze and glass objects, sculptures, coins and inscriptions from the 7th to the 5th century B.C., as well as pottery of the Byzantine and Ottoman periods. The exhibition within the museum contains works of art which describe the private and public life in ancient Athens. In 2012, a new sculpture exhibition was added to the museum which includes portraits from Athenian Agora excavations. The new exhibition revolves around portraits of idealized gods, officially honored people of the city, wealthy Roman citizens during the Roman occupation (1st and 2nd century A.D.), 3rd-century citizens and finally on works of art from private art schools of late antiquity.

- Media related to Museum of the Ancient Agora at Wikimedia Commons

== See also ==
- Ecclesia
- Church of the Holy Apostles
