= New Bouleuterion =

Ancient Athenian building

The New Bouleuterion is an ancient building in the city of Athens in Attica, Greece. It was located on the western side of the Ancient Athenian Agora. It is a theater with 12 rows of seats, with a seating capacity of greater than 500. A bouleuterion (Ancient Greek: βουλευτήριον, romanized: bouleutērion), sometimes translated as council house, assembly house, and senate house, was a building in ancient Greece which housed the council of citizens (βουλή, boulē) of a democratic city-state.

== Function ==
The New Bouleuterion housed a deliberative body within the Athenian legislature known as the Boule (βουλή, boulē), or the Athenian Council. The Boule was made up of 500 members, 50 from each of the 10 tribes. Its members were chosen by lot and served a one year term. The Boule met every day except festival days to propose legislation which could then be ratified by all the citizens in the Ekklesia.

== History ==
The Boule originally met in a building now known as the Old Bouleuterion, which lay along the west side of the Agora square. The Old Bouleuterion dates to the years around 500 B.C. and had simple wooden seating sufficient to accommodate the 500 members. During the first century of its use, it served also as a display area for numerous important documents, laws, and treaties:

Nevertheless I still wish you to hear the words on the stone in the Bouleuterion concerning traitors and those who attempt to overthrow the democracy.... These words, gentlemen, they inscribed on the stone, and this stone they set up in the Bouleuterion (Lykourgos, [Speech] Against Leokrates 124, 126).

In the late 5th century a new bouleuterion, immediately adjacent to the old one, was built to house the 500 members. The Old Bouleuterion was then given over entirely to archival storage.

== Structure ==
The original seats of the New Bouleuterion were probably of wood. There are differing views on the direction that the seats faced. Archaeologist John Travlos reconstructs them as facing east while professor and archaeological historian William Bell Dinsmoor's drawings show a New Bouleuterion with seats facing south. Classical archaeologist John Camp uses two versions of the actual seating configuration in his book (The Archaeology of Athens), both drawn by Dinsmoor, one in 1983/84 and one in 1985. Undisputed is that a porch was added ca. 300 B.C.

The reconstructions differ according to which seating arrangement one subscribes to; Travlos' reconstruction shows the porch with an open inner colonnade so the people seated could see out, whereas in the Dinsmoor/Camp reconstruction there is no inner colonnade.

== Conservation ==
Like the other buildings in the Ancient Athenian Agora, excavation of the sites was entrusted by the Greek state to the American School of Classical Studies. Conservation has been going on ever since 1949 as the final study of each building in the Ancient Athenian Agora was completed. The study of the New Bouleuterion (along with the Propylon, Metroon and Great Drain) was completed in 1953.

== Bibliography ==
- Thompson, Homer A. (1937). "Buildings on the West Side of the Agora". Hesperia: The Journal of the American School of Classical Studies at Athens. 6 (1): 1–226. ISSN 0018-098X. JSTOR 146486.
- Thompson, Homer A. (1940). "The Tholos of Athens and Its Predecessors". Hesperia Supplements. 4: i–160. doi:10.2307/1370766. hdl:2027/inu.32000000986101. ISSN 1064-1173. JSTOR 1370766.
- Thompson, Homer A.; Wycherley, R. E. (1972). The Athenian Agora XIV: The Agora of Athens: The History, Shape and Uses of an Ancient City Center. pp. iii–257. JSTOR 3601981.
- Camp, John McK. II (2010). The Athenian Agora: site guide (5th ed.). Princeton, N.J.: American School of Classical Studies at Athens. pp. 58–59. ISBN 9780876616574.
