= Strategeion =

Coordinates: 37.974690°N 23.721632°E

The Strategeion, a trapezoidal chamber located in the Ancient Agora of Athens, Greece, is known as the meeting room of the ten Strategoi of ancient Athens.

Having been built atop two ancient graves dating back nearly 2700 years, archaeological indications reveal the presence of a heroic cult dedicated to the hero named "Strategos", a name that was later used as a title for the Athenian generals.

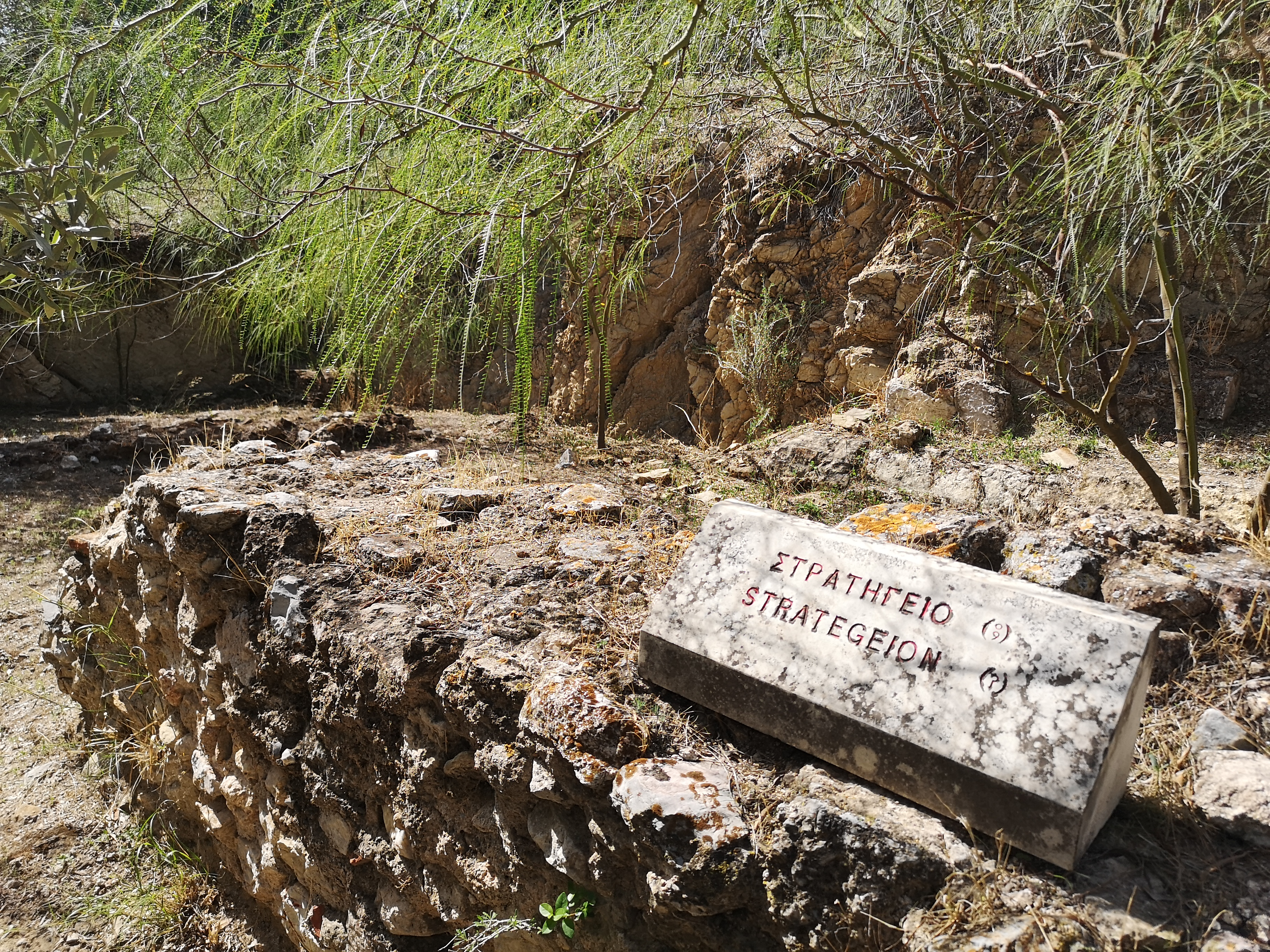
The remains of the Strategeion in the Ancient Agora of Athens

The ten Strategoi (including known figures such as Pericles, Aristides, Themistocles, Cleon, and Nicias), who were elected for one year and one for each tribe, used to discuss and take decisions regarding matters of finance, politics and foreign policy.

== See also ==
- Constitution of the Athenians
