= Odeon of Agrippa =

Odeon in the Ancient Agora of Athens

Coordinates: 37.9751°N 23.7232°E

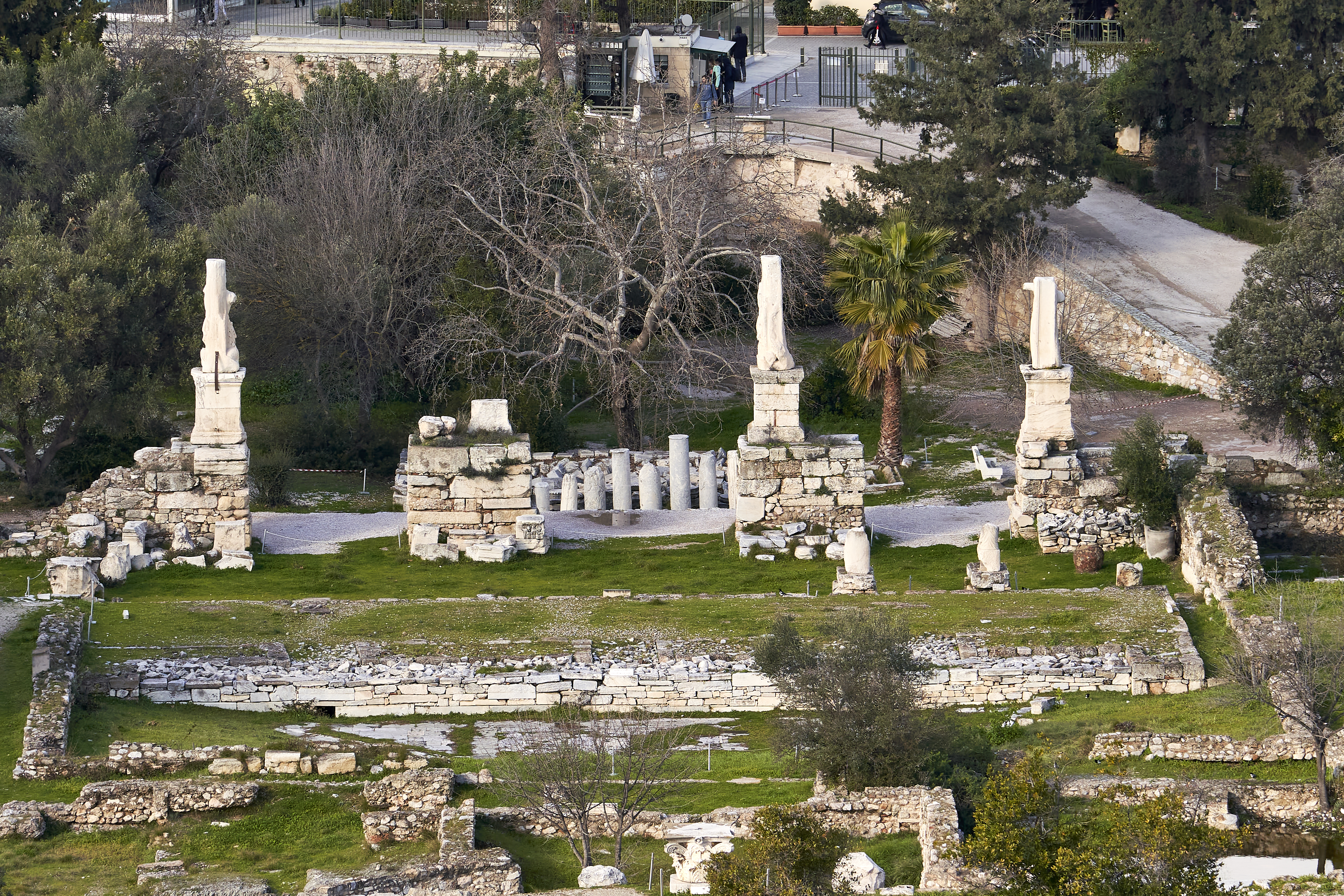
The remains of the Odeon in the Agora of Athens

The Odeon of Agrippa was a large odeon located in the centre of the ancient Agora of Athens. It was built about 15 BC, occupying what had previously been open space in the centre of the Agora. It was a gift to the people of Athens by Marcus Vipsanius Agrippa, a Roman statesman and general.

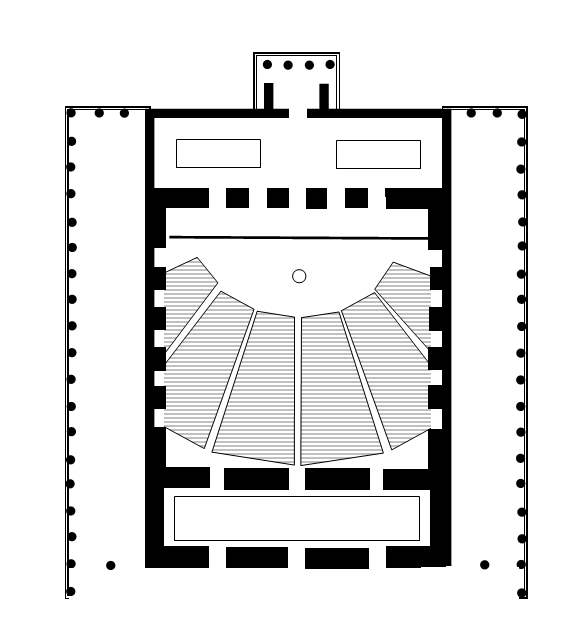
Floor plan of the original Odeon of Agrippa

== History ==
The two-story auditorium seated around 1,000 spectators and was equipped with a raised stage and marble-paved orchestra. On three sides it was surrounded by a subterranean cryptoporticus with stoae above. The building was decorated externally with Corinthian pilasters. The main entrance for spectators was originally on the south side of the building, with access from the terrace of the Middle Stoa. The north facade only had a small portico to give access to the stage.

Unfortunately, the 25 m (82 ft) span of the auditorium eventually caused the roof to collapse in around 150 AD. The Odeon was rebuilt as a smaller lecture hall, seating only 500, and a more elaborate facade was added to the north side. Its massive pillars were carved in the form of 'giants' (snake tails) and 'tritons' (fish tails).

The Odeon was finally destroyed in 267 AD by the Herulians. A sprawling palace was built on the site in the early 5th century AD with the pillars of the northern facade being used to create a monumental entrance.

== See also ==
- List of Greco-Roman roofs
- Lists of Roman sites
