= Lefteris Giovanidis =

Greek theatre director and translator

Lefteris Giovanidis (Greek: Λευτέρης Γιοβανίδης) is a theatre director, performing arts manager and translator from Greece. From 2020 until 2023 he was the artistic director of Piraeus Municipal Theatre. He was also the artistic director of the Municipal and Regional Theatre of Kozani.

== Biography ==
He studied at the Drama School of Athens supervised by director Giorgos Theodosiadis and graduated in 1995. After his graduation he worked for two years as an actor in Athens and in 1997 moved to New York, USA in order to study stage directing at Michael Howard Studios and Herbert Bergohof Studio. He also attended courses at Actors Studio New York City. During his stay in USA he worked as assistant director and then as director. He returned to Greece in 2000.

In New York 1998, he founded his own company, Seventh Theatre, and produced Sheppard’s True West and Marivaux's A matter of dispute. In 2003, he set up in Athens a not-for-profit company that has produced more than 14 performances.

Giovanidis has directed 46 plays, has translated 14 plays to Greek and made 6 adaptations of books for theatre. He has instructed drama and improvisation-classes at the Drama School of National Theatre of Northern Greece. He has co-operated with theatres and institutions like the National Theatre of Greece, National Theatre of Northern Greece, Croatian National Theatre (Gradsko kazalište Marina Držića), Patras Municipal and Regional Theatre, Foundation of the Hellenic World, Michael Cacoyannis Foundation, Athens Festival, State Theatre of Turkey, etc.

He directed the medal ceremonies of the Athens Olympics 2004 and 2004 Summer Paralympics and the opening ceremony for the 2007 World Rhythmic Gymnastics Championships in Patras.

== Theatre ==
Year	Title	Theatre
2024	Romeo and Juliet, William Shakespeare	State Theatre of Turkey and Megaron, The Athens Concert Hall
2023	The Elephant, Kostas Bostantzoglou	Municipal Theatre of Piraeus
2022	Merry Wives, William Shakespeare	Municipal Theatre of Piraeus
2022	Enoch Arden, Alferd Tennysson	MMA
2021	Loukis Laras, Dimitrios Vikelas	Municipal Theatre of Piraeus
2021	La bella Greca, Theodora Kapralou	
2019	The Rose Tattoo, Tennessee Williams	Regional Theatre of Greece
2019	The backgammon, Dimitris Kechaidis	Regional Theatre of Greece
2018	Romeo and Juliet, William Shakespeare	National Theatre of Croatia, Regional Theatre of Greece
2018	Manos Eleutheriou	Regional Theatre of Greece
2017-18	Schumann, Sophia Kapsourou	National Theatre of Greece
2017	The Greek Christmas Carols, Y. Markopoulos	Megaron, The Athens Concert Hall
2017	Fools, Neil Simon	Agios Dimitrios Theatre
2017	The Statue That felt Cold, Christos Boulotis	Benaki Museum
2017	L'Origine du monde, Sébastien Thiéry	Hellenic World
2017	Of love..., Konstantina Varsami	Gazarte stage
2016	Emil and the Detectives, Erich Kästner	Hellenic World
2016	Moonlight Sonata, Yiannis Ritsos	Festival of Mantinia
2016	Escuela, Guillermo Calderón	Theatre Thission
2015	Antigone, Sophocles	KDEPPAM, Mykonos
2014	The selfish giant and his love, Constantina Varsami	Texnopolis, Gazi
2014	Fishsoup, George Lebesis	Acropol Theatre
2014	Medea, Jan Rene Lemoine	Michalis Cacogiannis Foundation, Athens
2014	Janis Joplin-ROOM 105, Gigi Gaston	Aggelon Vima Theatre
2013	Heidi, Johanna Spyri	Piraeus 131 Theatre
2013	Dreaming stories, Elisavet Georgiadi	Texnopolis, Gazi
2013	Interview, Alexis Stamotis	Southbank Centre, London, UK
2013	Educating Rita, Willy Rusell	Theatre Alma, Athens
2012	Atomic Alert, Fred. Sonntag	Michalis Cacogiannis Foundation, Athens
2012	Bastion, Luko Paljetak	Kazaliste Marina Drzica, Dubrovnik, Croatia
2012	Reunion, David Mamet	Apollon Theatre, Patras
2011	Love to death, Aldo Nikolai	Mikro Theater, Larissa
2011	Heidi, Johanna Spyri	Apollon Theatre, Patras
2009	Sonnets, William Shakespeare	Theatre 104 Kastaniotis, Athens
2008	Hetaerae Dialogues, Loukianos	National Theatre of Northern Greece
2008	The Age of Chrysanthemums, Manos Eleftheriou	Athinaida Theatre
2008	Richard III, W. Shakespeare	La Fenice Theatre, Venice, U.T. of Europe
2007	Why Madonna and not me, Mixalis Kokkoris,	National Theatre of Northern Greece
2006	The magic flute, Wolfgang Mozart	Apollon Theatre, Patras
2005	Melocoton en almibar, Migel Mihura	Roes Theatre, Athens
2004	The Master Builder, Henrik Ibsen	Modern Theatre of Athens
2004	Wheelchair dancer, Sara Froeber	American – Hellenic Center of Arts
2003	A song of a night gale, Charlot Chandler	Metaxourgio Theatre, Athens
2002	Who discovered America?, Chrysa Spiliotis	Argo Theatre, Athens
2001	Los figurantes, José Sanchis Sinisterra	Institute Thervantes, Athens
1999	True West, Sam Shepard	Center Stage Theatre, New York
1999	A matter of dispute, Marivaux	Kraine Theatre, New York

== Selected translations ==
- “Enoch Arden”, Alfred Tennysson, (Megaron-The Athens Concert Hall-2022)
- “The Rose Tattoo”, Tennessee Williams (Regional theater of Northern Greece-2019)
- “Reunion”, David Mamet, (Apollon Theatre, Patras - 2012)
- “Heidi”, Johanna Spyri, (Apollon Theatre, Patras - 2011)
- “The smell of the kill”, Michelle Lowe, (Diana Theatre, Athens - 2010)
- The Magic Flute, Wolfgang Mozart, (Apollon Theatre, Patras - 2006)
- “Black bird”, David Harrower, (Aplo Theatre, Athens - 2006)
- “Trip to Bountiful”, Horton Foot, Vasilakou Theatre, Athens - 2005)
- “Melocoton en almibar”, Migel Mihura, Roes Theatre, Athens - 2005)
- “The Master Builder”, H. Ibsen, Modern Theatre, Athens - 2004)
- “Wheelchair dancer”, Sara Froeber, American– & Hellenic Center of Arts - 2004)
- “Play on”, Rick Abbot, Argo Theatre, Athens - 2003)
- “The whales of August”, David Berry, National Theatre of Greece - 2002)
- “Happy days”, Samuel Becket, (Rialto Theatre, Athens - 1997).
