= Agoraea =

Ancient Greek mythological figure

"Agoraea" and "Agoraeus" (Ancient Greek: Ἀγοραία, Agoraia and Ἀγοραῖος, Agoraios) were epithets given to several divinities of Greek mythology who were considered to be the protectors of the assemblies of the people in the agora (ἀγορά), particularly in Athens, Sparta, and Thebes. The gods so named were Zeus, Athena, Artemis, and Hermes. As Hermes was the god of commerce, this epithet seems to have reference to the agora as the marketplace; a bronze statue of Hermes Agoraeus is mentioned as standing near the agora in Athens by both Aristophanes and Demosthenes.

The Agoraios Kolonos, or "Market Hill", was a precinct on the westernmost boundary of the agora in Athens.

== See also ==
- Altar of Zeus Agoraios – Ancient altar in Athens, Greece
