= Bouleuterion =

Assembly building of Ancient Greece

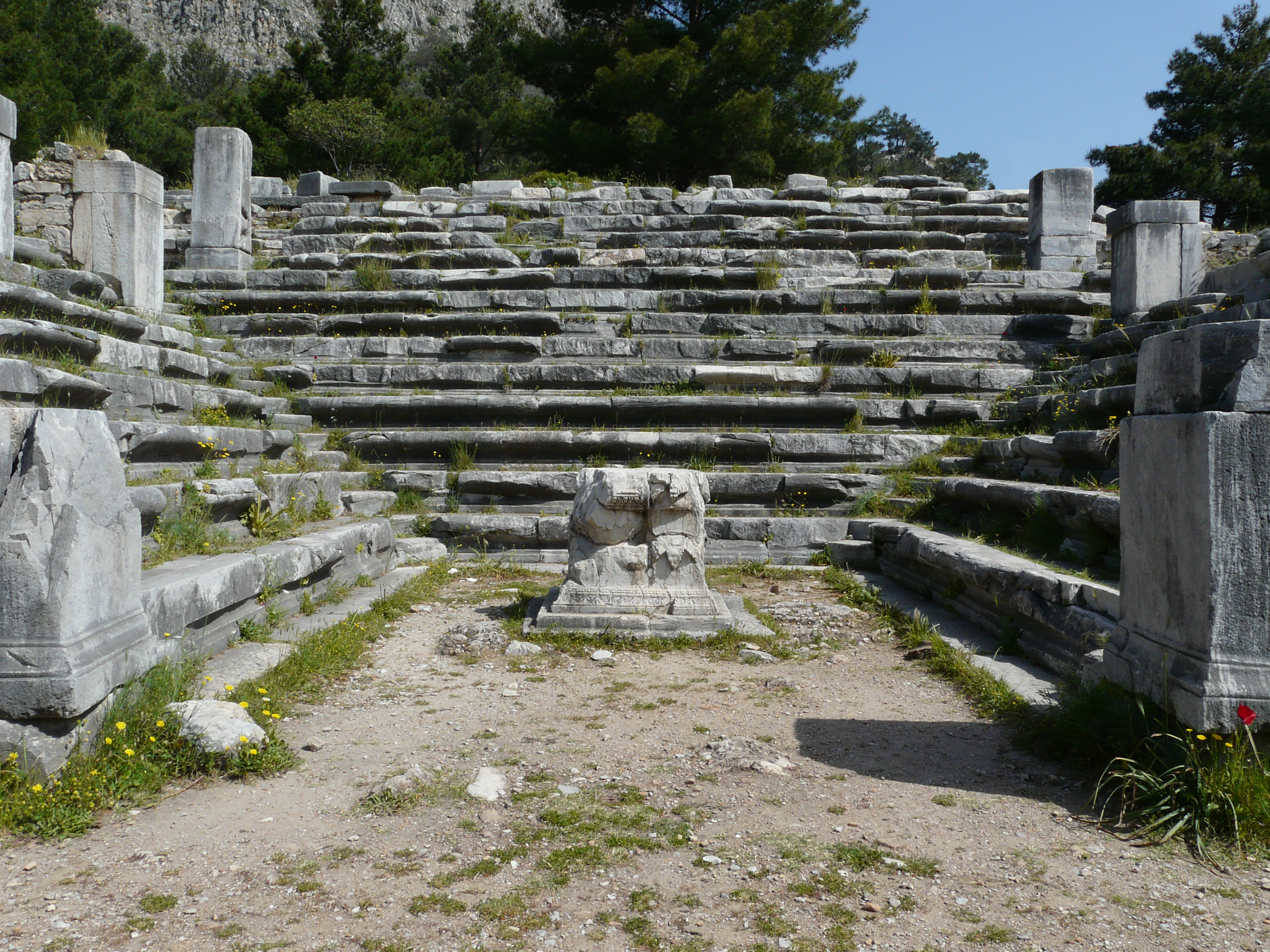
Bouleuterion of Priene

Bouleuterion (Ancient Greek: βουλευτήριον, bouleutērion), also translated as council house, assembly house, and senate house, was a building in ancient Greece which housed the council of citizens (βουλή, boulē) of a democratic city state. These representatives assembled at the bouleuterion to confer and decide about public affairs. There are several extant bouleuterion around Greece and its former colonies. It should not be confused with the Prytaneion, which housed the executive council of the assembly and often served as the boule's mess hall. The early bouleuterions were believed to have been originated from entertainment buildings as their architecture was similar to each bouleuterion. These buildings differed in size and structure as well as design.

== The Greek Agora ==
The agora in ancient Greece was the heart of a city state. It housed buildings like the bouleuterion but also was used for public uses like athletics or voting. The agora was used by the citizens of Greece on an everyday basis, and holds inscriptions to express its laws and record keeping. The Agora was bordered by stones to mark its area to not be encroached on by individuals. Other buildings held inside of the Agora were temples, stadiums, altars, and fountains, for the people of Greece to be able to use.

== Athenian Bouleuterion ==
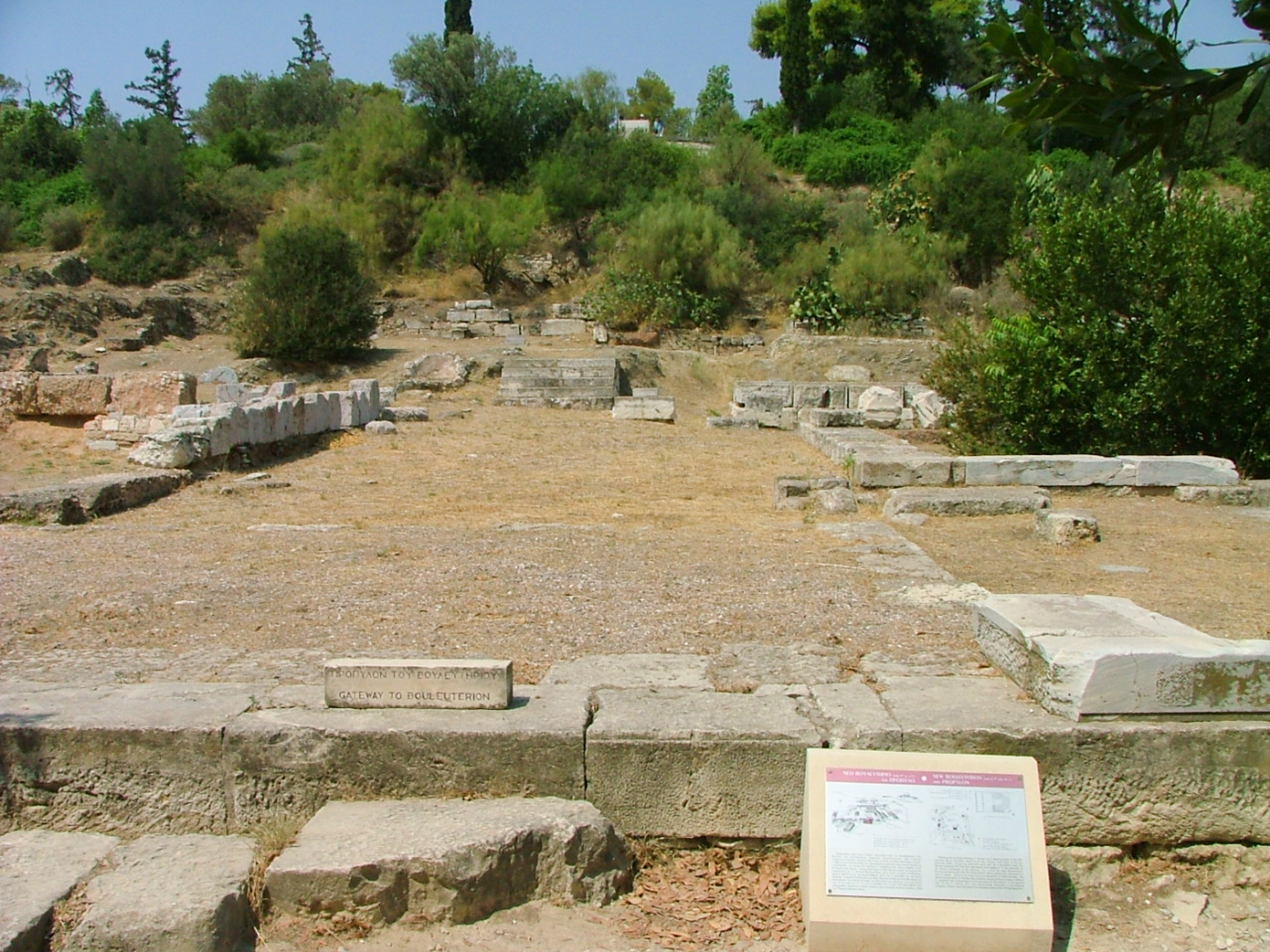
Remains of the bouleuterion in the Agora of Athens

The Athenian Boule is better known as the Council of 500. Solon was credited with its formation in 594 BC as an assembly of 100 men each from Athens's four original tribes. At the adoption of the new constitution around 507 BC, this was changed to 50 men each from the 10 newly created tribes. Each served a one-year term. The boule had specific powers and responsibilities to their government that revolved around supervising the officials and their actions. The most common actions the boule focused on were taxes, and land reservation.

The Old Bouleuterion was built on the west side of the Agora below the Agoraios Kolonos around 500 BC. It was almost square and included an oblong antechamber and a main council chamber, a large rectangular room with wooden benches arranged in rows along the walls. The roof was supported by five columns. It is now better known as the Metroon ("House of the Mother") since it was repurposed as her temple after the construction of the New Bouleuterion.

The New Bouleuterion was built west of the old building in the late 5th century BCE. It was smaller but more sophisticated, with an amphitheater-like system of twelve levels of semicircular benches. The New Bouleuterion used a form of democracy similar to the Old Bouleuterion where ten tribes had 50 different members to ensure equal participation. Both the Old and the New Bouleuterion used the nearby Tholos.

== Athenian Bouleuterion Architecture ==
The Old Bouleuterion in Athens had dimensions measured at 23.5 x 23.8 meters which is larger than the New Bouleuterion. The New Bouleuterion took a smaller size of 17.5 x 22.5 meters. It is unknown as to why the New Bouleuterion was constructed. The Old bouleuterion differs from the New Bouleuterion in shape as the New Bouleuterion holds a semi-circular shape interior and rectangular outside, while the Old Bouleuterion holds a rectangular shape both inside and outside.

== Bouleuterions Outside of Athens ==
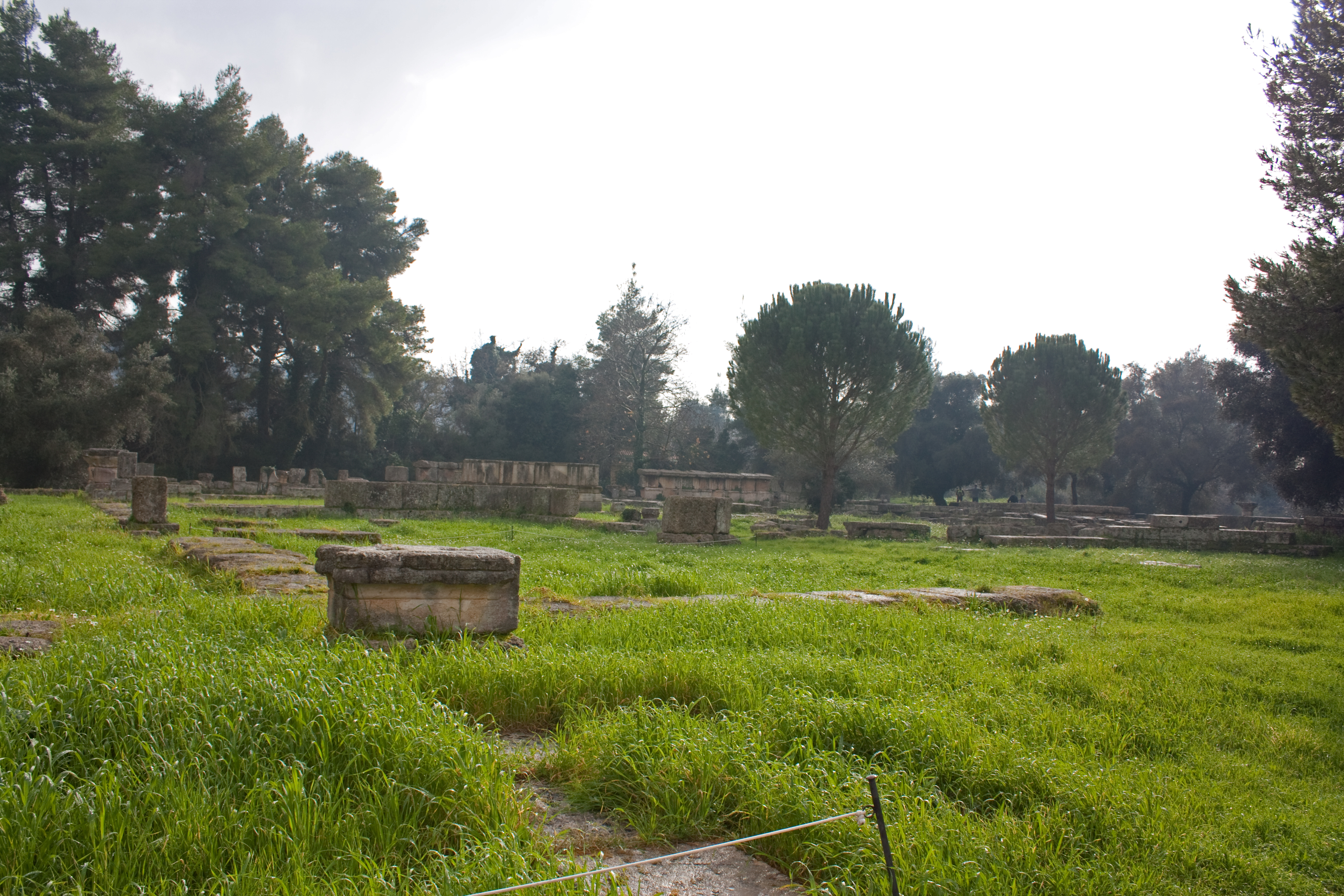
Bouleuterion ruins in Olympia

The bouleuterion in Olympia was built with the dimension of 13.78 x 30.65 meters, which is smaller than the Old Bouleuterion, but larger than the New Bouleuterion in Athens. The only structure of this monument that has survived was the foundations it was built on.

The Bouleuterion at Dodoni had dimensions of 43.60 x 32.35 meters, being one of the largest bouleuterion discovered. The entrance is still intact measuring to 3.25 meters high. The roofing collapsed but the pillars on the inside of the bouleuterion show that the roof went up to 30.2 meters high.

== Other bouleuteria ==
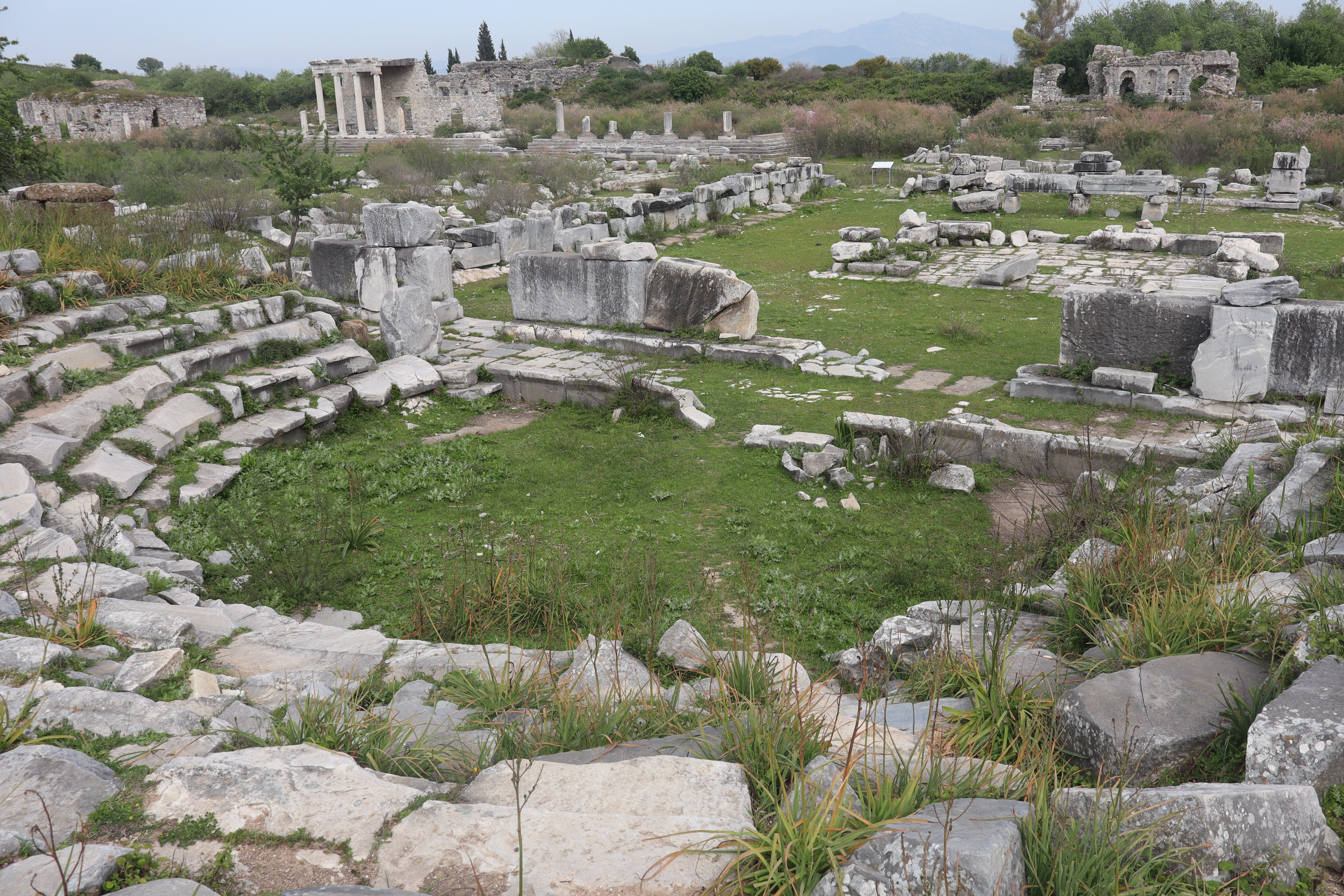
Bouleuterion of Miletus

Other notable bouleuteria are located at:

- Anemourion (Anamur, Turkey)
- Aphrodisias (Geyre, Turkey)
- Argos in Greece
- Ancient Mantineia (Gortsouli, Arkadia)
- Glanon (St-Rémy, France)
- Iasos (Güllük Gulf, Turkey)
- Lemnos in Greece
- Miletus (Balat, Turkey)
- Paestum (Italy)
- Philippopolis (Plovdiv, Bulgaria) – Bouleuterion of Philippopolis
- Priene (Güllübahçe Turun, Turkey)
- Messene (Messini, Greece)
- Termessos (Güllük Dağı, Turkey)
- Troy (Hisarlik, Turkey)
