= Synagogue in the Agora of Athens =

Putative ancient synagogue in the Agora of Athens, Greece

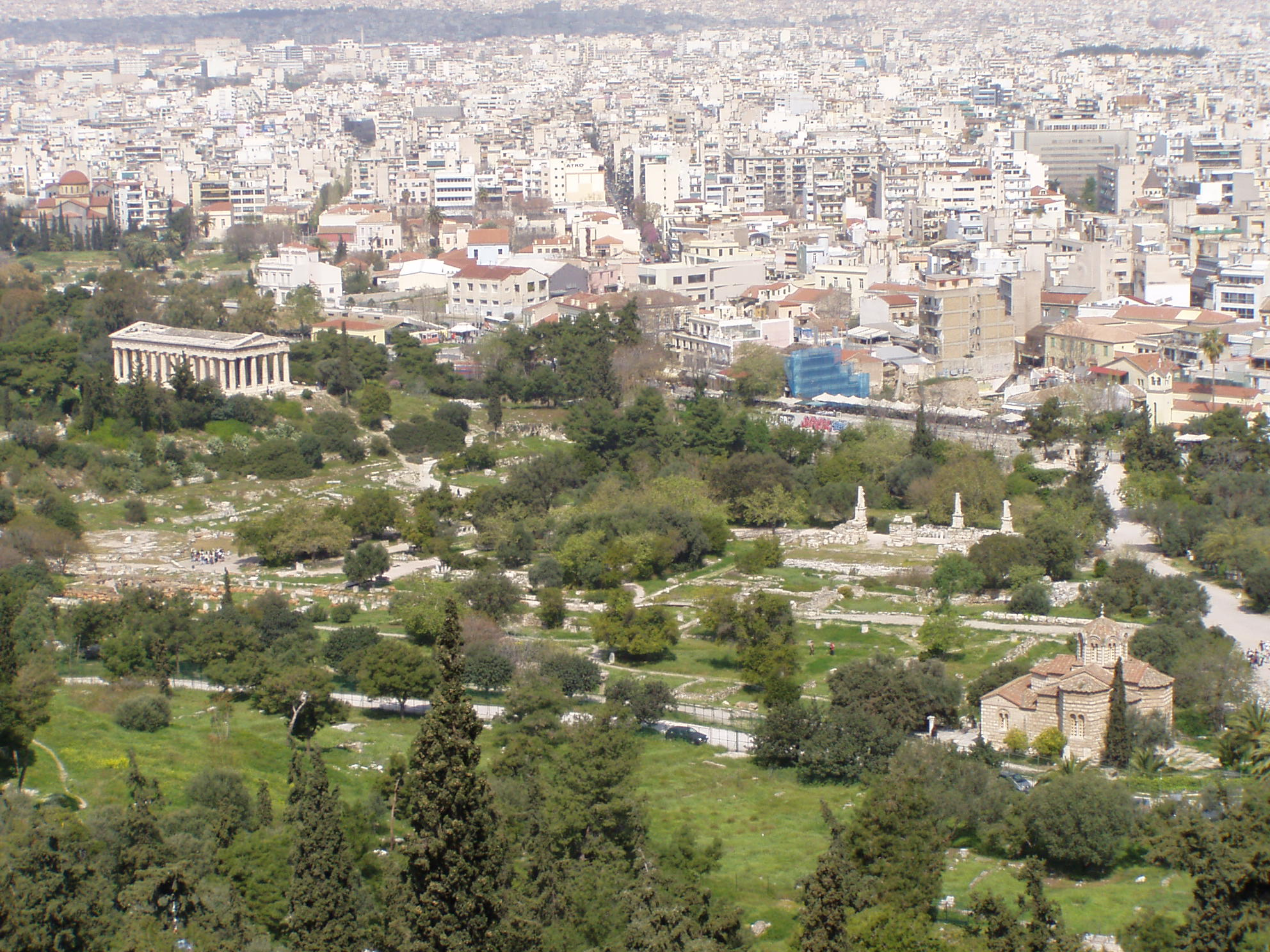

- Approximate location of the putative synagogue in Athens

Religion
- Affiliation: Judaism (former)

Location
- Location: Ancient Agora of Athens
- Country: Greece
- Coordinates: 37°58′29″N 23°43′20″E

Architecture
- Type: Synagogue architecture
- Completed: After 267–early 5th century CE
- Materials: Pentelic marble

The Synagogue in the Agora of Athens is a putative former Jewish synagogue located in the Ancient Agora of Athens. On the basis of a marble fragment showing a menorah and a lulav (palm branch), discovered near the Hellenistic Metroon in 1933, Homer Thompson proposed that the northern rooms of the Metroon may have been converted into a synagogue some time after the sack of the city by the Germanic Heruli people in 267 CE, and continued in use into the early fifth century CE.

== Background ==
Athens is known to have been home to a Jewish community from the second century BCE, which probably maintained a building for collective worship. In the Acts of the Apostles the apostle Paul is said to have visited a synagogue during his visit to Athens in 54 CE. (Note: Acts 17:17. Barrett, C. K. A Critical and Exegetical Commentary on the Acts of the Apostles. Vol. 2. London: T&T Clark International. p. 828. ISBN 0-567-08395-0. Llewellyn Smith, Michael (2004). Athens: A Cultural and Literary History. Oxford: Signal Books. p. 80. ISBN 1-902669-81-9.) The location of that synagogue is unknown, but William A. McDonald argued in 1941 that it was probably outside the Agora, because Paul is described as preaching "in the synagogue and in the Agora". The archaeological evidence for the Jewish community of Athens is scanty: a few funerary inscriptions with names that appear to be Jewish and a small number of terracotta lamps decorated with Jewish symbols, the earliest of which are dated to the fourth century CE.

== The building identified as a synagogue ==
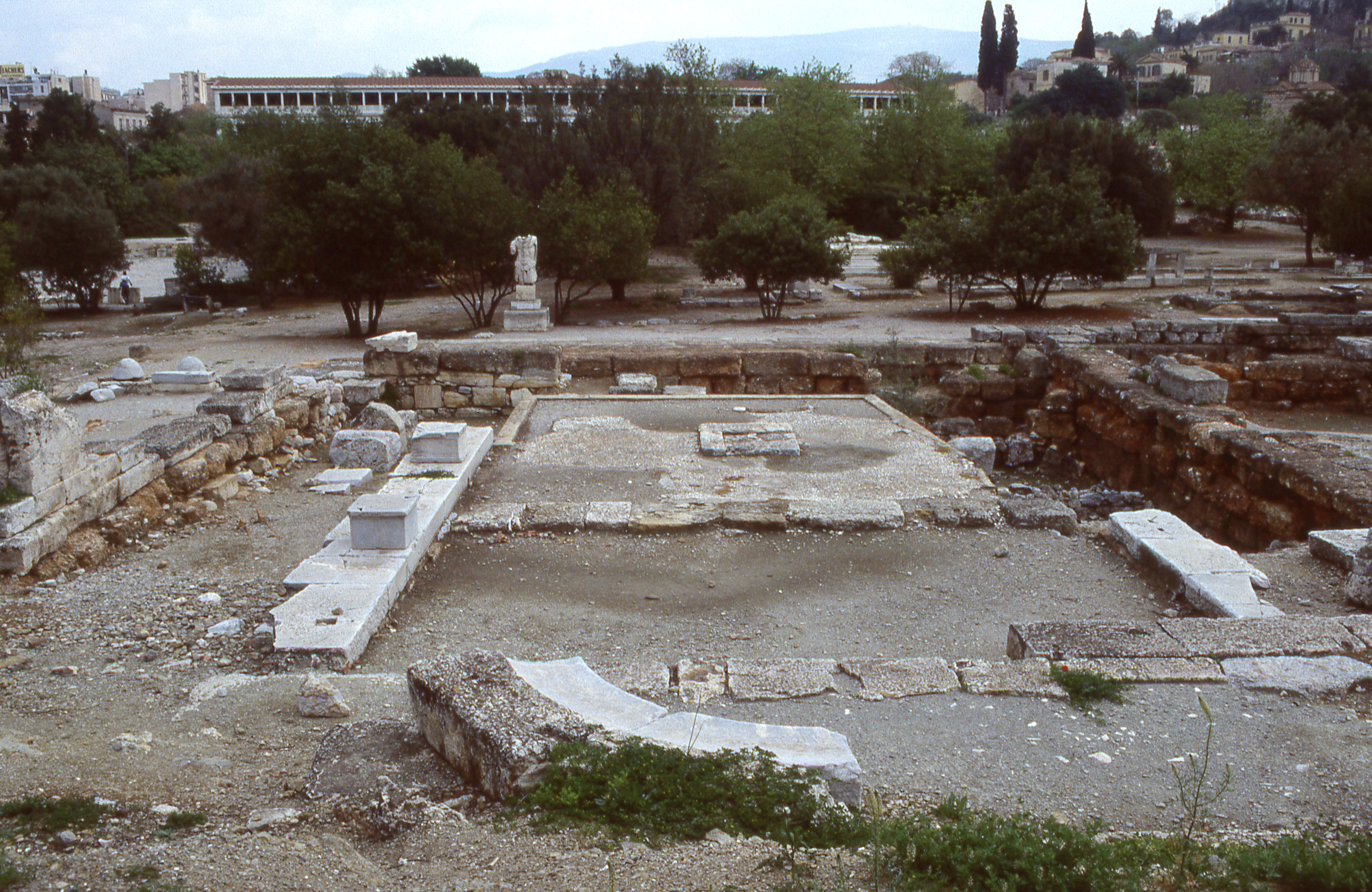
The northernmost room of the Metroon in its final phase, which Thompson proposed as the site of the synagogue

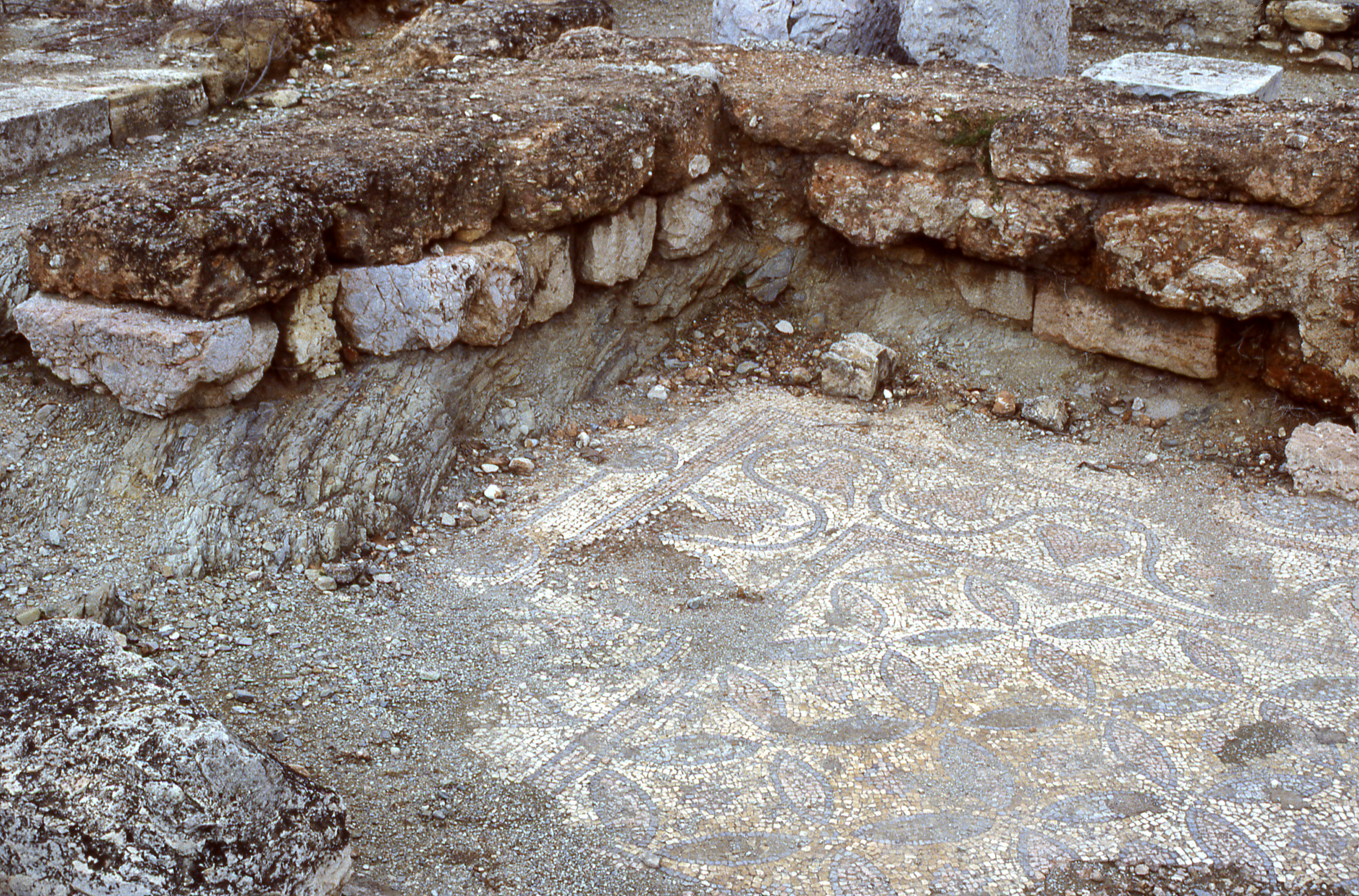
A portion of the fifth-century mosaic floor in the second room from the north

The Hellenistic Metroon was constructed on the west side of the Athenian Agora in the mid-second century BCE. According to the second-century CE traveler Pausanias, on whom the modern identification of the building depends, it contained a temple to the Mother of the Gods, as well as the Athenian state archive. The building was seriously damaged during the sack of the city by the Germanic Heruli people in 267 CE, and seems to have been only partly rebuilt. Between the late third century and the early fifth century the two northern rooms were remodeled at least twice. In its final form, the northernmost room had a basilical plan with an apse lined with marble benches at the western end, and the room adjoining to the south had a mosaic floor with geometric and ivy patterns, now only partly preserved. Coins found beneath the floor indicate a date in the early 5th century for the final remodeling of this room, and by inference for the final phase of the northernmost room as well.

In the 1970s, Homer Thompson, who had directed the Agora excavations between 1946 and 1967, tentatively proposed that the restored northern rooms of the Metroon may have been used as a synagogue. He noted that the plan of the northernmost room was similar to that of a third-century CE synagogue built into the gymnasium at Sardis, and associated it with a fragment of marble found in 1933 a few meters northeast of the Metroon, which was incised with images of a seven-branched menorah and a lulav, or palm branch. (Note: The fragment was stored with the context pottery from the 1933 excavations and assigned Agora inventory number A 4546 in 1977.) Thompson believed that this fragment, which was found in a context of the fourth to fifth century CE, was originally part of a curvilinear frieze over a doorway or niche.

In 2019, Mark Wilson described the identification of this synagogue as "possible", as has John Camp in works from 1980 and 2010, while Nicholas Stravroulakis and Timothy J. DeVinney described it as "probable" in 1992. Alison Frantz, writing in 1988, called the suggestion an "attractive theory", but cautioned that more investigation was needed to confirm it.

== See also ==
- History of the Jews in Greece
- Oldest synagogues in the world
