= List of stoae =

Stoas, in the context of ancient Greek architecture, are covered walkways or porticos, commonly for public usage. The following is a list of Greek and Hellenistic stoas sorted alphabetically by the stoa's city or location, with the name appearing in bold text, followed by a short description and/or location of the stoa:

== A ==
=== Alexandria ===
- Doric Stoa: monumental Doric stoa built at a right angle to the ancient main street along the ancient street R4, dated to the Ptolemaic period

=== Assos ===
- **North Stoa** (Lower Story): Two-storied Doric on the north side of the agora.
- South Stoa: Two-aisled on the south side of the agora.

=== Athens ===
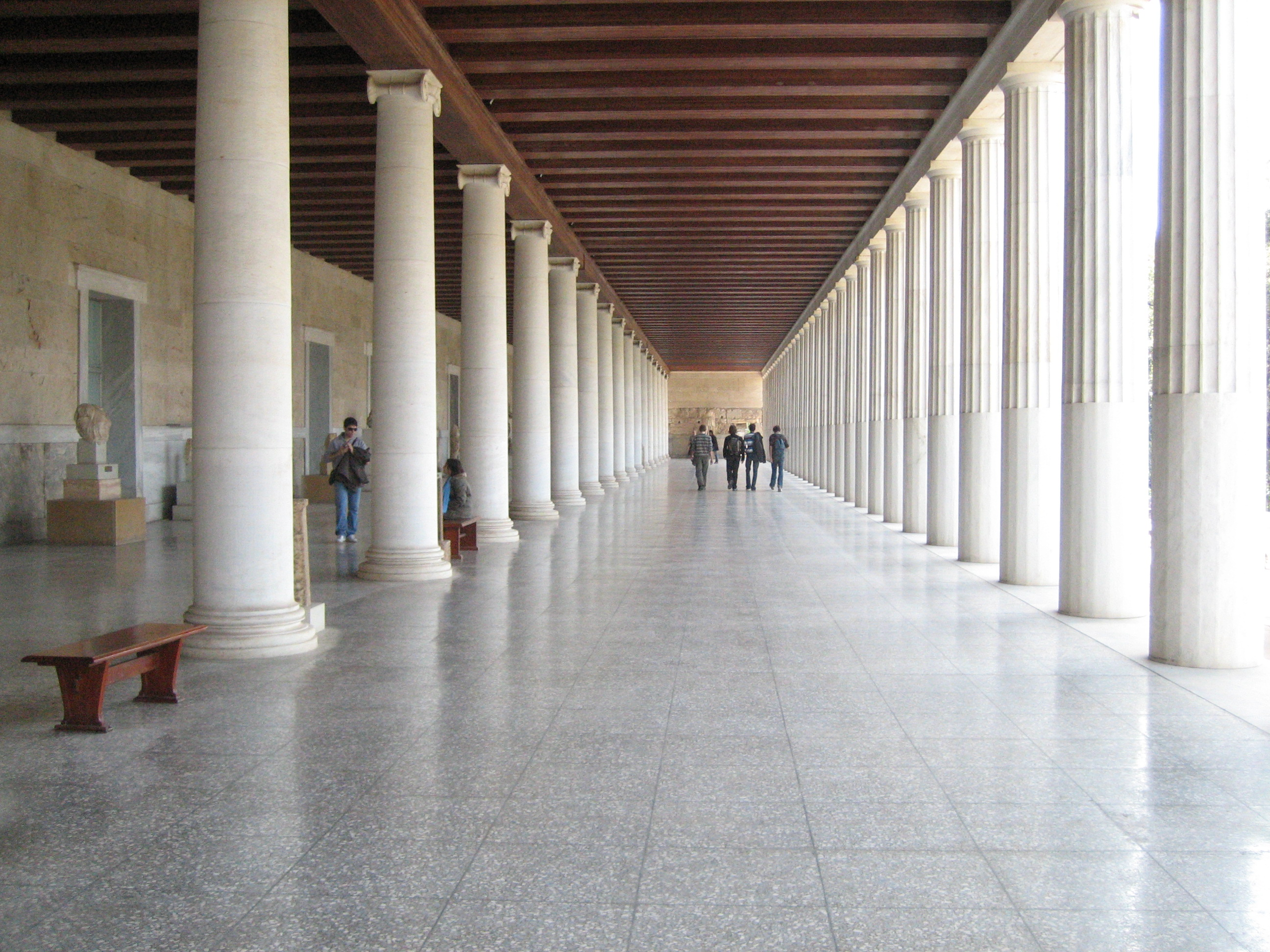
Stoa of Attalos

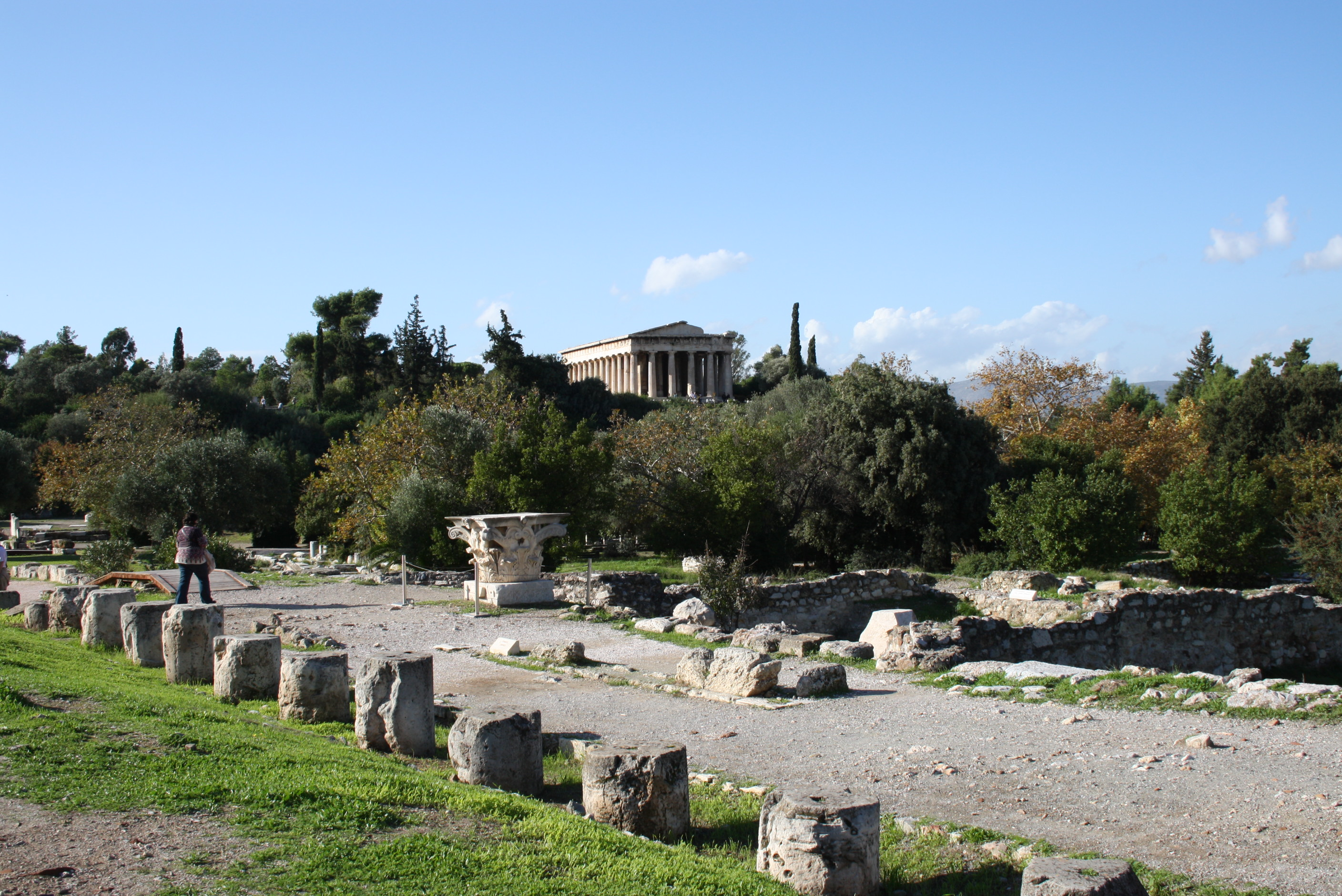
Middle Stoa

- Doric Stoa: near Theater of Dionysos in the Sanctuary of Dionysos Eleuthereus on the south slope of the Acropolis, sharing its north wall with the back wall of the stage building of the Theater of Dionysos.
- **East stoa** a small stoa in the south-east quadrant of the Agora.
- Middle Stoa: approximately in the middle of the Agora and dividing it into north and south areas.
- South Stoa I (of Athens): on the south side of the Agora, located between the Heliaia and the Enneakrounos.
- South Stoa II: on the southern edge of the Agora, on the approximate location of the South Stoa I, between the Heliaia, and the Middle Stoa.
- Southeast Stoa: near Library of Pantainos and the Eleusinion.
- Stoa Amphiaraion: on the east side of the Sanctuary of Amphiaraios, southeast of the Theater.
- **Stoa Basileios** (**Royal Stoa**): in the northeast corner of the Agora.
- **Stoa of Hermes** located to the north of the Agora.
- Stoa of Artemis Brauronia: Stoa with wings; the south boundary of the Sanctuary of Artemis Brauronia, on the Acropolis, southeast of the Propylaia, west of the Chalkotheke.
- Stoa of Attalos: Two-storied on the eastern side of the Agora.
- **Stoa of Zeus** (Eleutherios): Two-aisled in the northwest corner of the Agora.
- **Stoa Poikile** (**Painted Porch**): on the north side of the Ancient Agora of Athens, the stoa from which Stoicism takes its name
- Street Stoa: between Library of Pantainos and Roman Agora.

== D ==
=== Delos ===
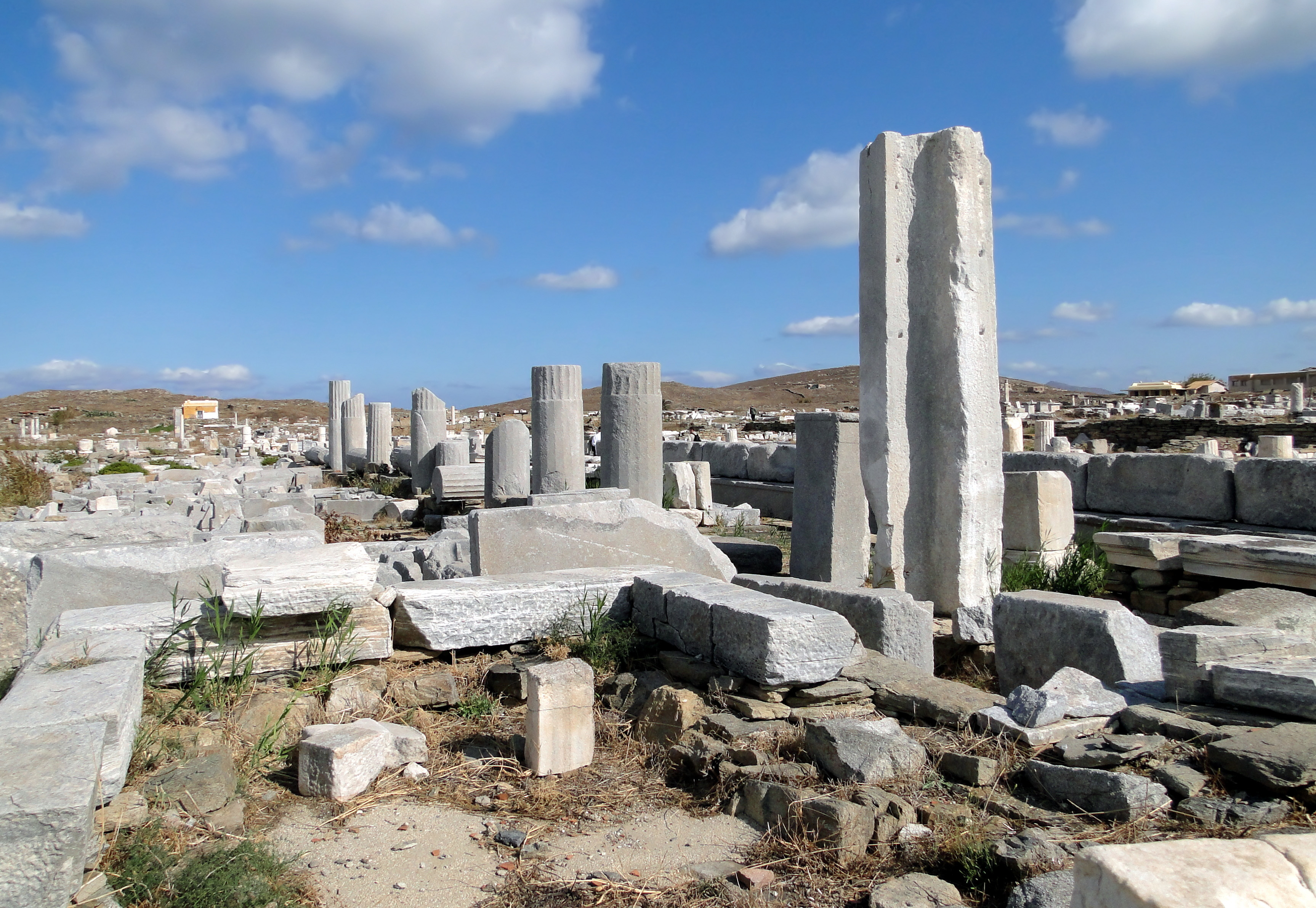
Stoa of Philip, Delos

- South Stoa I: south of the Sanctuary of Apollo and west of the Oblique Stoa and the L-shaped Stoa of the Agora of the Delians.
- Stoa of Philip: Two-part south of the Sanctuary of Apollo, between the South Stoa and the harbour.
- Oblique Stoa: south of the Sanctuary of Apollo, south of the L-shaped Stoa of the Agora of the Delians.
- Stoa of Antigonos: Two-aisled the north boundary of the Sanctuary of Apollo.
- L-shaped Stoa of the Agora of the Delians: Stoa creating north and east sides of a court, south of the Sanctuary of Apollo.
- Stoa of the Naxians: L-shaped forming the southwest corner of the Sanctuary of Apollo.
- L-Shaped Stoa: L-shaped bounded the Sanctuary of Artemis (Artemision) on the eastern side of the Sanctuary of Apollo.

=== Delphi ===
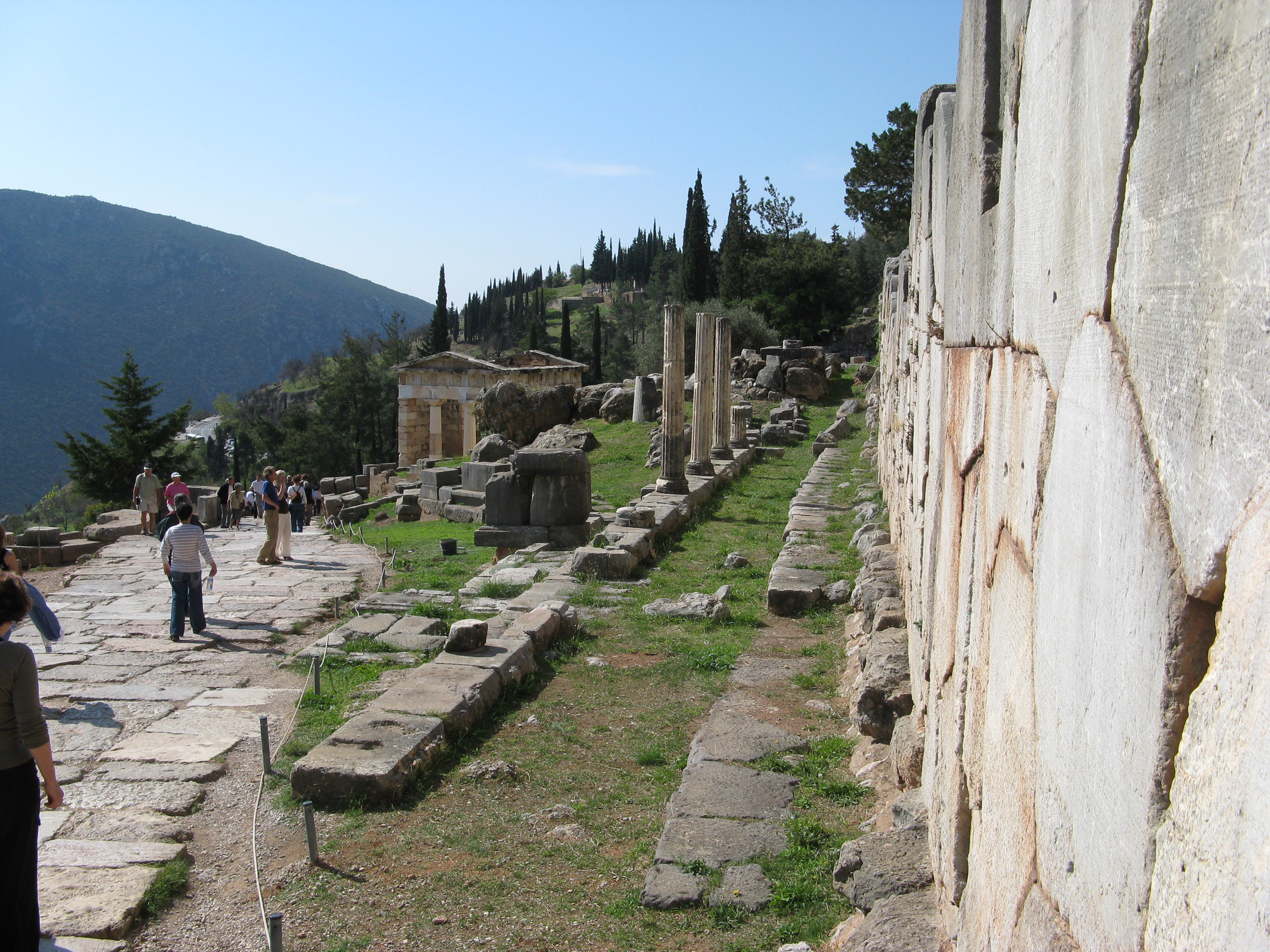
Stoa of the Athenians, Delphi

- Stoa of the Athenians: in the Sanctuary of Apollo, south of the Apollo Temple platform, with the southern, polygonal wall of the platform forming the north wall of the stoa.
- Stoa SD 108: At the south-East entrance of the Sanctuary of Apollo, on the north side of the so-called "Sacred Way". Offering from the Arcadians.
- West Stoa: projecting from the west wall of the Sanctuary of Apollo, southwest of the Theater.
- Stoa of Attalos I: in the Sanctuary of Apollo, east of theater and northeast of the Temple of Apollo, intersecting and projecting east from the peribolos wall.

== B ==
=== Brauron ===
- Stoa at Artemision: Three-sided surrounding the northern end of the Sanctuary of Artemis.

== E ==
=== Eleusis ===
- Stoa of the Great Forecourt: L-shaped stoa with rooms; northeast of the Greater Propylon, outside the Sanctuary of Demeter and Kore, bounding east and west sides of a court.

=== Epidauros ===
- Stoa of Apollo Maleatas: on the north side of the Sanctuary of Apollo Maleatas.

== L ==
=== Lindos ===
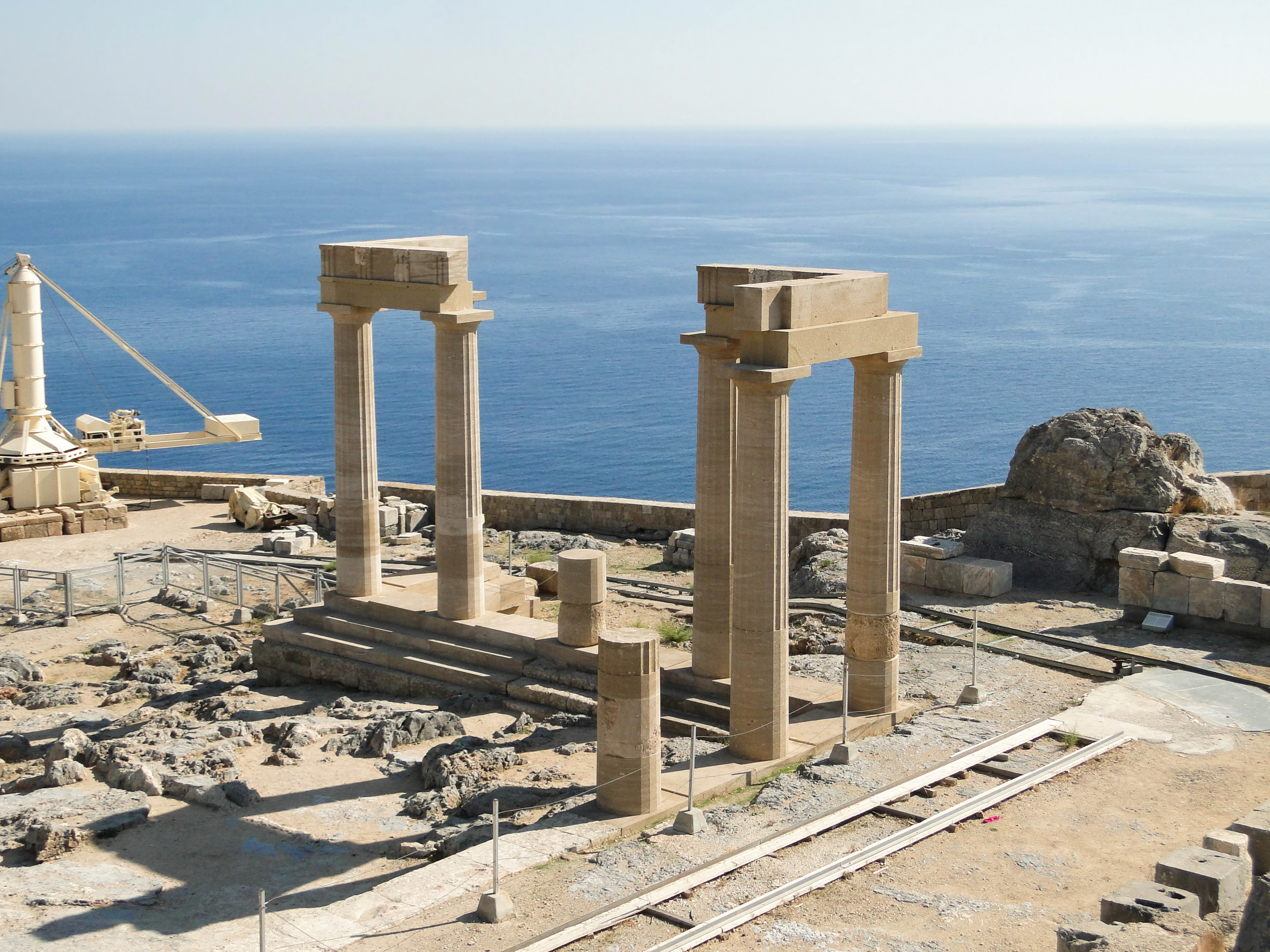
Lindos stoa

- Acropolis of Lindos Stoa: Hellenistic stoa.

== O ==
=== Olympia ===
- South Stoa: T-shaped the southern boundary of the Sanctuary of Zeus (Altis).
- **Echo Hall** (Painted Stoa): on the east side of the Sanctuary of Zeus (Altis), forming an eastern boundary to the central sanctuary.

== P ==
=== Philippi ===
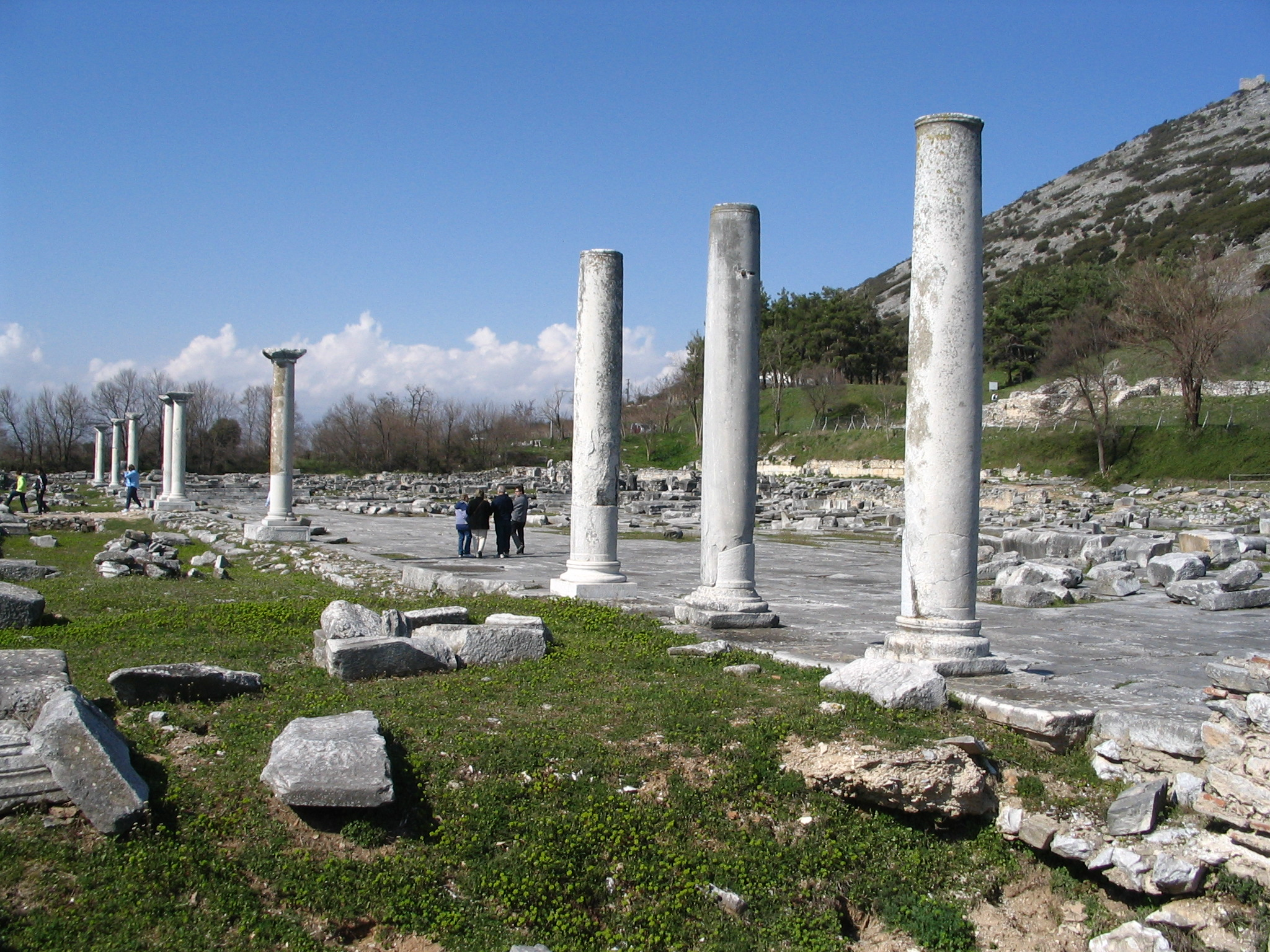
Stoa of Philippi

- Stoa of Philippi : Roman-era stoa.

=== Priene ===
- Sacred Stoa: Two-aisled stoa located in the north of the agora in the center of the city.
- Stoa of Athena Sanctuary: One-aisled stoa facing south, forming southern extremity of Sanctuary of Athena Polias.

== S ==
=== Samos ===
- South Stoa: South Stoa, SW of the main altar in Sanctuary of Hera, Samos.
- North West Stoa: North West Stoa, NW of main altar and W of N gate at Sanctuary of Hera.

=== Sounion ===
- West Hall: along western wall of the Sanctuary of Poseidon, at a right angle and adjacent to the North Hall.
- Sounion, North Hall: along the northern wall of the Sanctuary of Poseidon at the western end.

== T ==
=== Thermon ===
- Middle Stoa: in the Sanctuary of Apollo Thermios, running north–south between the Temple of Apollo and the South Stoa.
- South Stoa: on the south side of the Sanctuary of Apollo Thermios, parallel to the southern sanctuary wall.
- East Stoa: at the southeast corner of the Sanctuary of Apollo Thermios.
