= Constitution of the Athenians =

Constitution of the Athenians (Greek: Athenaion politeia) may refer to either of two ancient treatises on the subject of the government of Athens:

- Constitution of the Athenians (Aristotle), a treatise on the Athenian constitution written by Aristotle or one of his students
- Constitution of the Athenians (Pseudo-Xenophon), a treatise preserved under the name of Xenophon, though not actually by him

It may also refer to the following historical constitutional and legal codes under which Athens was governed at various periods:

- Draconian constitution, the code of laws in Athens written by Draco in the last quarter of the seventh century BC
- Solonian constitution, the constitution implemented in Athens by Solon in the early sixth century BC
- Areopagite constitution, the Athenian constitution before the reforms of Ephialtes in 462 BC
