= Bryaxis =

4th-century BC Greek sculptor

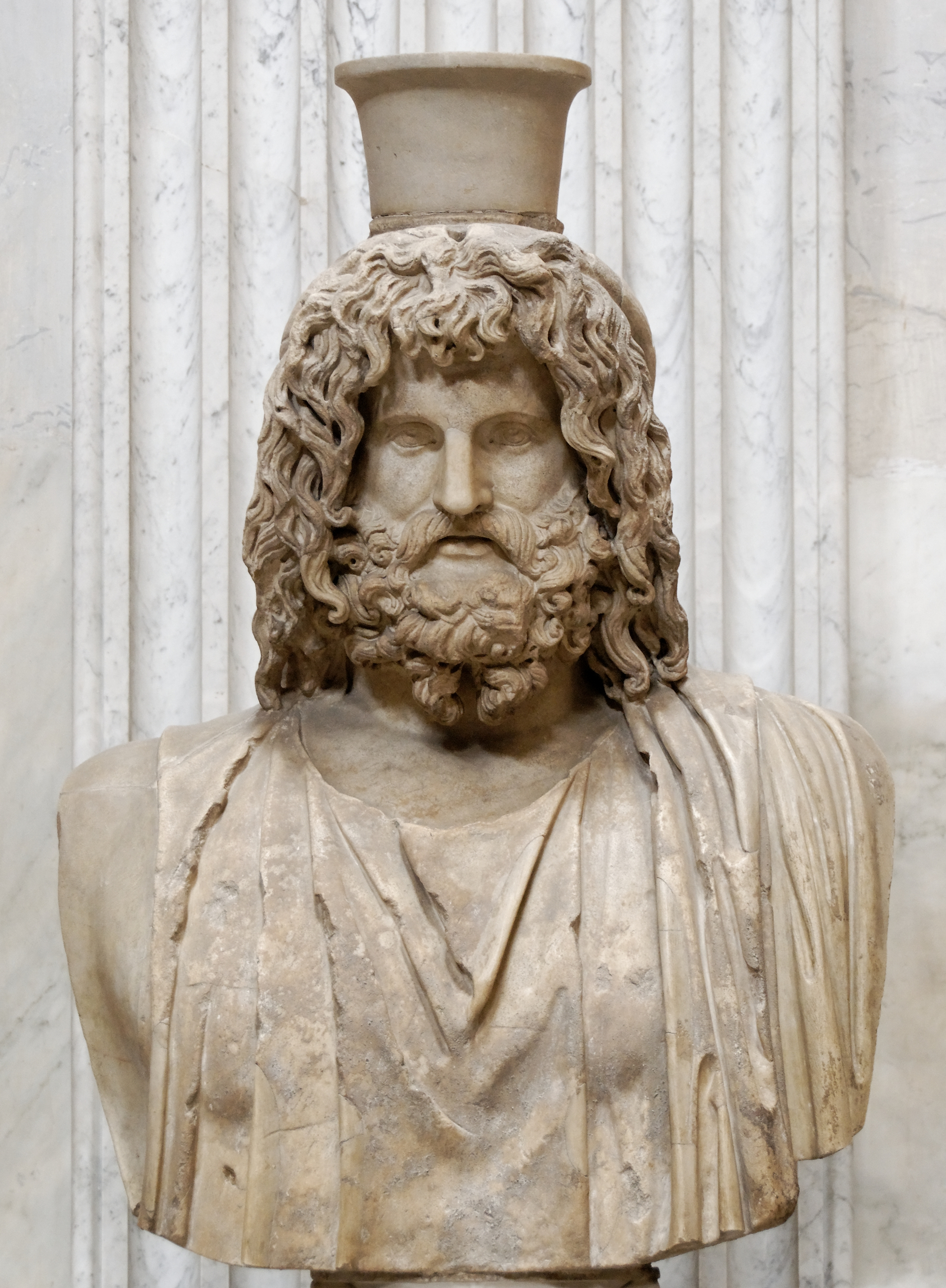
Bust of Serapis. Roman copy of the original Bryaxis.

Bryaxis (Ancient Greek: Βρύαξις or Βρύασσις; fl. 350 BC) was a Greek sculptor. He created the sculptures on the north side of the mausoleum of Maussollos at Halicarnassus which was commissioned by the queen Artemisia II of Caria in memory of her brother and husband, Mausolus. The three other greatest sculptors of their time, Leochares, Scopas and Timotheus, were each one responsible for one side of the grave. The tomb was completed three years after the death of Mausolus and one year after the death of Artemisia. Some authors allege that Bryaxis created a famous colossal statue of Serapis in the temple at Alexandria; however, according to Michaelis, Athenodoros Cananites expressly pointed out that the Bryaxis connected with the Alexandrian statue was merely a namesake of the famous Bryaxis. The works of Bryaxis include a bronze statue of Seleucus, king of Syria, five huge statues at Rhodes, and a statue of Apollo at Daphne near Antioch.
