= Stoa of Zeus Eleutherios =

Stoa in Ancient Agora of Athens

Coordinates: 37.9757°N 23.7221°E

Plan of the Agora at the end of the Classical Period (ca. 300 BC); the Stoa of Zeus Eleutherios is number 4.

The Stoa of Zeus Eleutherios was a two-aisled stoa located in the northwest corner of the Ancient Agora of Athens. It was built c. 425 BC–410 BC for religious purposes in dedication to Zeus under his epithet Eleutherios ("pertaining to freedom"): a cult founded after the Persian War. Stoas were not commonly used for religious purposes, but were typically built for promenades and meetings.

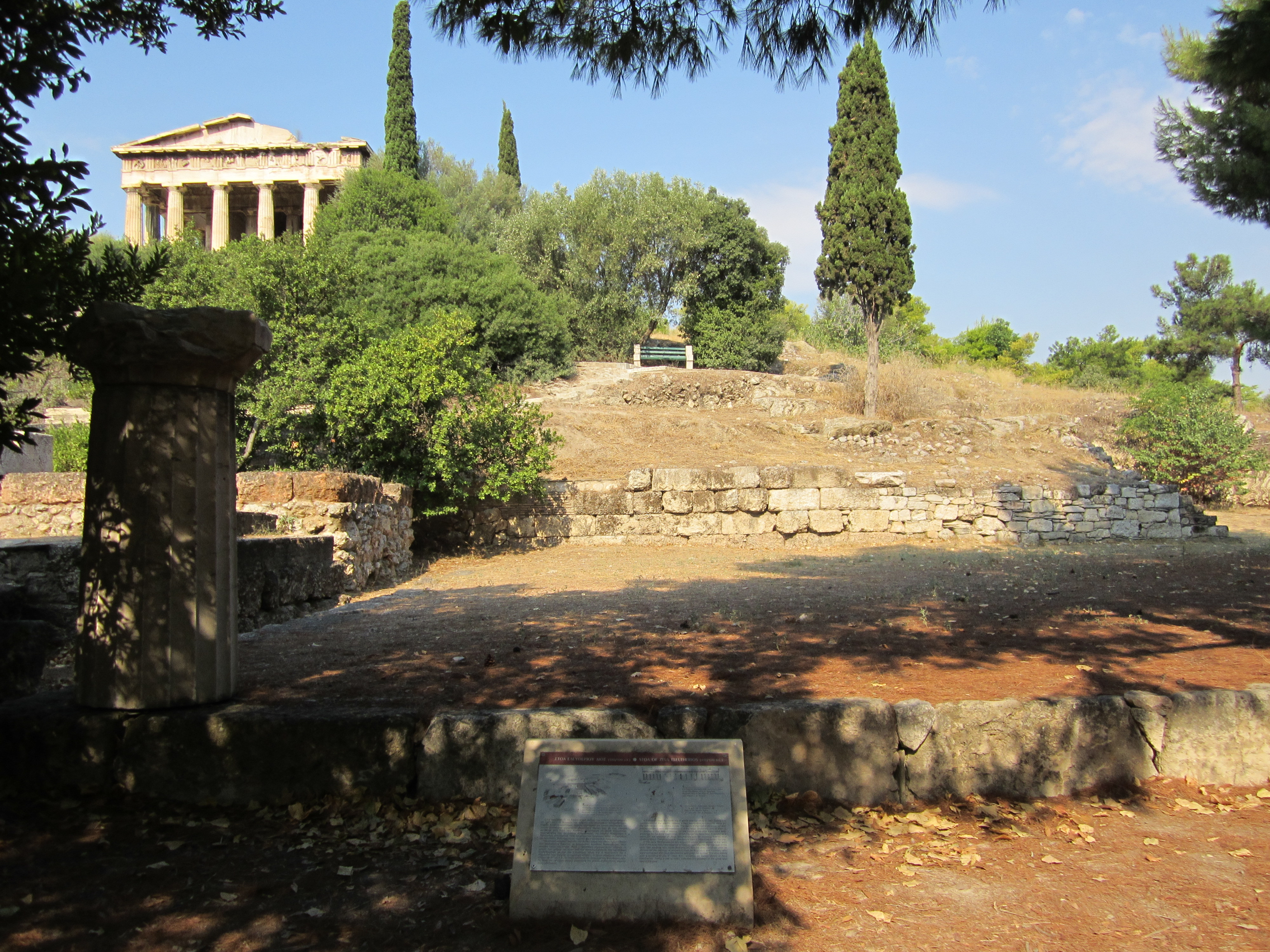
The Stoa of Zeus Eleutherios, the ancient Agora of Athens, Greece.

It is different from others in that it was a stoa rather than a temple (the common building used for religious purposes). Scholars believe the building also served other civic purposes due to its central location. Researchers think the structure may have been built by Mnesikles, the architect who built the Propylaia. The Propylaia was the Periclean gateway to the Acropolis. In the late first century BC a two-room annex was added, possibly for the cult of the Roman imperial family. The building in all was 43.56 meters by 10.73 meters.

== Bibliography ==
- Thompson, H. A. (1937). "Buildings on the West Side of the Agora". Hesperia. 6: 1–226.
- Thompson, H.A. (1966). "The Annex to the Stoa of Zeus Eleutherios in the Athenian Agora". Hesperia. 35: 171–187.
