= Sundial, Taganrog =

The Sundial
- Russian: Солнечные часы
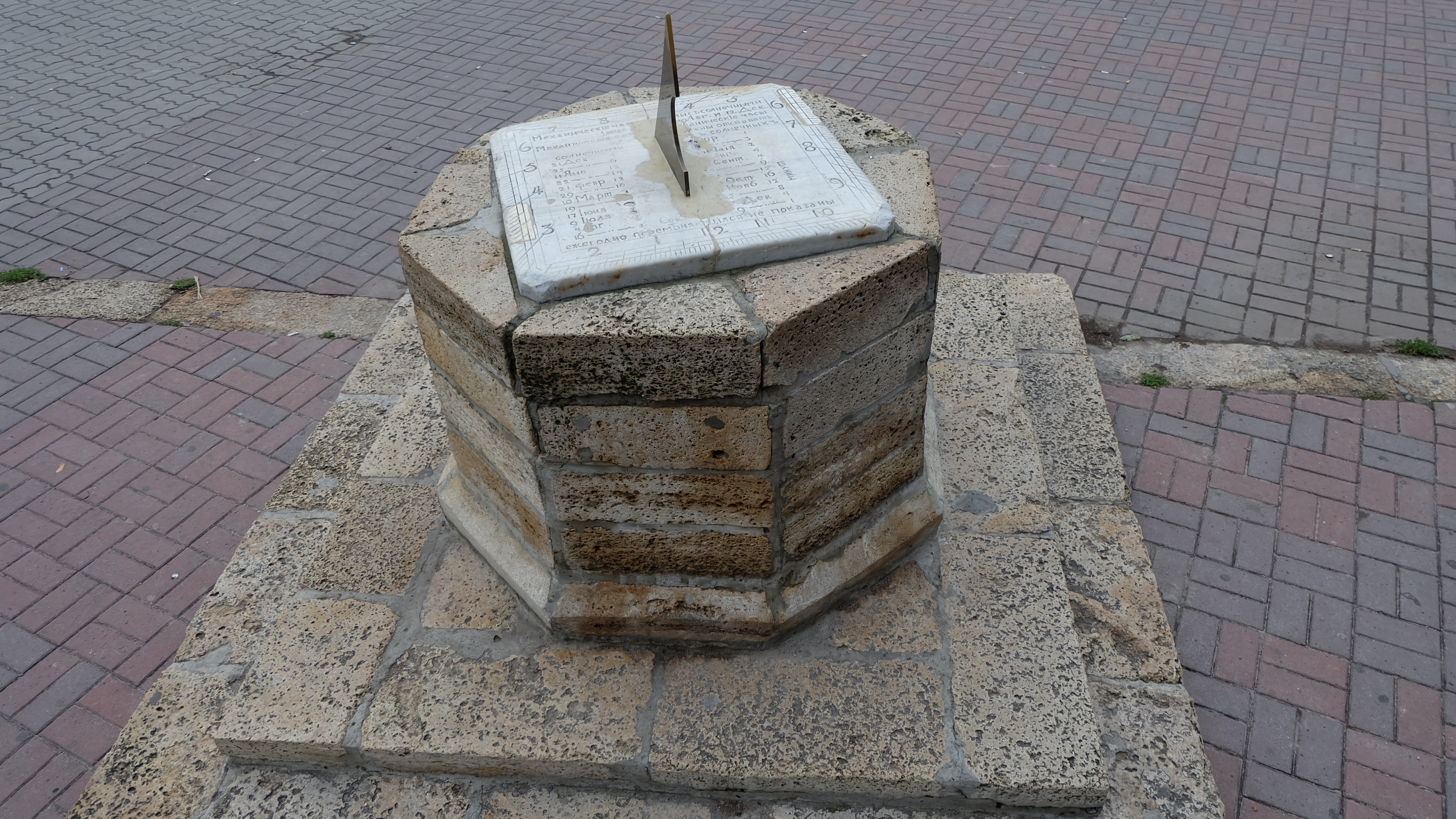
- Opened: 1833
- Location: Grecheskaya Street; Taganrog, Rostov Oblast, Russia
- Interactive map of The Sundial
- Coordinates: 47°12′45″N 38°56′14″E

The Sundial (Russian: Солнечные часы) in Taganrog was set in 1833. It is situated in Grecheskaya Street, close to the Depaldo Stairs. It is officially declared an object of cultural heritage of Russia of Regional significance.

== History ==
The Sundial was installed in 1833 under the 6th Governor of Taganrog, Baron Otto Germanovich Frank. In 1972, in 1990, and in 2006―2007 the sundial was redecorated, the gnomon was replaced several times and so now the sundial works somewhat inaccurately. Taganrog Sundial is now the oldest currently existing sundial in Russia.

== Description ==
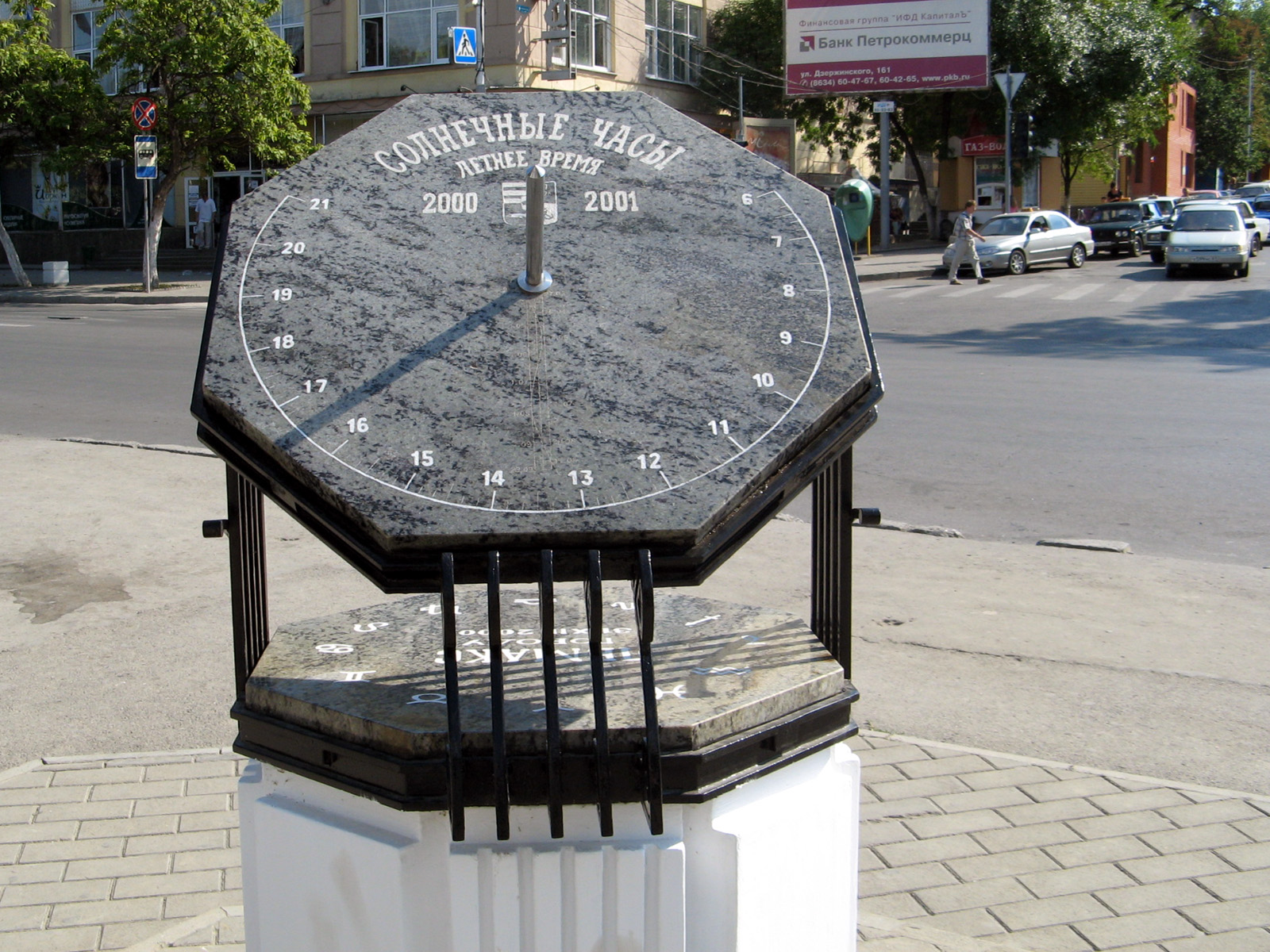
the new Sundial

The dial of the Sundial is unusual: figures engraved on it were calculated according to a special formula, in addition to the notatification of a day hour, some corrections are given for each month of the year. Gnomon, the time indicator, is a metal triangle with a notch, and one of the sharp angles of it is equal to the geographical latitude of Taganrog ― 47 ° 12 'N. The gnomon is fixed perpendicular to the dial so that its hypotenuse is directed to the pole of the Earth. The clock's arrow is the edge of the shadow cast by the gnomon of the dial. In the Northern Hemisphere (where Taganrog is situated) at noon, this shadow is directed to the north. The clock does not take into account the transition from winter to summer time and vice versa. Earlier the Taganrog Sundial showed the right local solar time (which for Taganrog was 25 minutes earlier than Moscow time), and with the help of the corrections given to the dial, this time could be brought into line with the mechanical clock. As a result of several restorations, this accuracy has now been lost.

In 2000, before the central entrance to the Taganrog Gorky Park, a new sundial was installed. Unlike the sundial at the Depaldo Stairs, the new one casts a shadow at the plate, set at an angle of 47 ° 12 '(the latitude of Taganrog) to the horizon. This made it possible to make the time scale of the time scale even, and also made it possible to count the time in winter and summer according to the additional scale. The error in counting on these clocks is less than 1 minute.

== Literature ==
- Энциклопедия Таганрога. — Ростов-н/Д: Ростиздат, 2003. — 512 с. — ISBN 5-7509-0662-0
