= Metroon =

Type of ancient Greek temple

A metroon (Ancient Greek: Μητρῷον, Mētrō̂on or Mētrō̂ion) was an ancient Greek temple dedicated to a mother goddess. They were often devoted to Cybele, Demeter, or Rhea.

== Athens ==
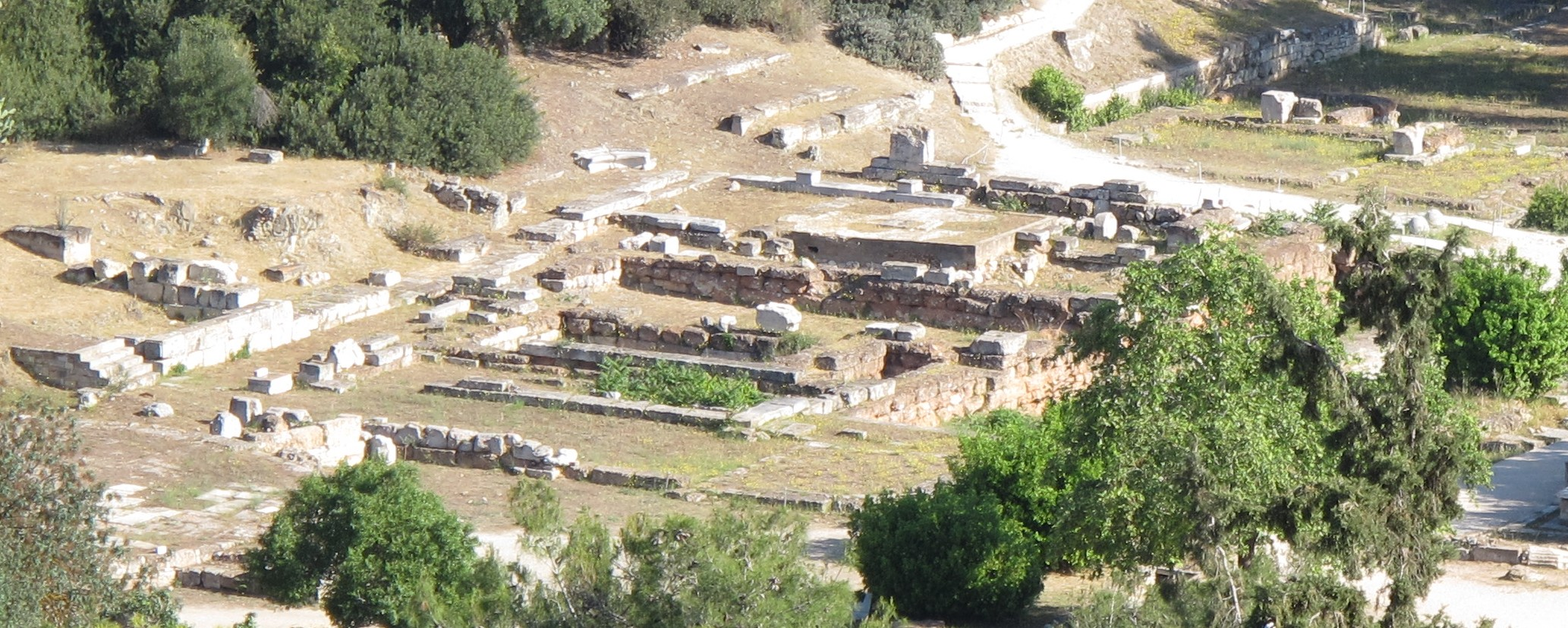
Excavated ruins of the Metroon in Athens

The Athenian Metroon (coordinates: 37.975214°N 23.722077°E) was located on the west side of the city's Agora, in the Old Bouleuterion, which formerly housed the city council. At the end of the 5th century BC, the New Bouleuterion was built and the council's former home converted into a temple to Cybele. According to legend, the Athenians had killed one of her wandering priests when he attempted to introduce her cult; the plague which then visited the city was dealt with by honouring her. (The account may, however, have been a later invention, as the earliest source is from the 4th century AD.)

The Metroon served other public functions, such as housing the official archives of the city. For instance, the philosopher Epicurus filed a donatio mortis causa there.

== Olympia ==
The Olympian Metroon was erected in the late 4th or early 3rd century BC, immediately below the terrace which housed the Treasuries.

== See also ==
- Ancient Greek religion
