= Altar of Zeus Agoraios =

Ancient altar in Athens, Greece

Coordinates: 37.9752°N 23.7225°E

The Altar of Zeus Agoraios (meaning Zeus of the Agora) is an altar dating to the 4th century BC located north-west of the Ancient Agora of Athens, constructed from white marble, 9m deep and 5.5m wide.

It was one of the first objects to be discovered inside the Agora during the excavations of 1931. Evidence of marks done by masons from the Augustan period show that it was moved from an initial source later identified as the Pnyx located outside the ancient Agora.

One of the excavators of the Agora, T. L Shear Jr., noted:

it may not be coincidence that Zeus, whose special task it was to govern the political assemblies of the Athenians, should depart the Pnyx at just the time when Augustus is said to have curtailed sharply the powers of those same assemblies.
