= Foundation of the Hellenic World =

Greek non-profit organization

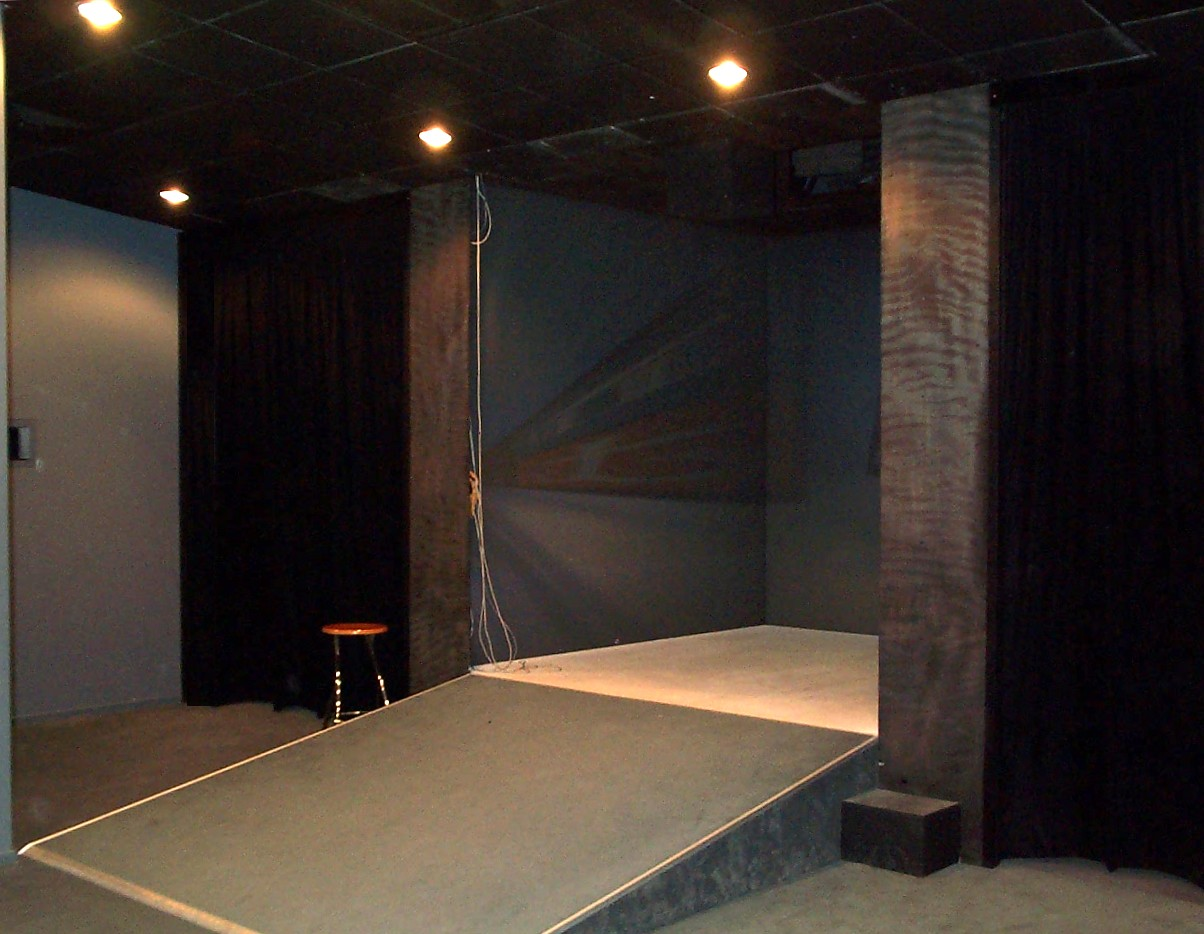
CAVE virtual reality system in FHW

The Foundation of the Hellenic World or FHW (Greek: Ίδρυμα Μείζονος Ελληνισμού), is a charitable, non-profit organization based in Athens focused on preserving and presenting the history and culture of the Greek people both within and outside of Greece through technology.

It was inspired by the businessman Lazaros Efraimoglou (1932-2013), who also financed it. Its establishment was ratified in 1993 by a law of the Hellenic Parliament.

The purpose of the Foundation is to keep the historical memory and Greek tradition alive, and to promote the universal dimension of Hellenism. For this purpose, it uses modern methods, such as three-dimensional graphics, virtual reality applications, and interactive exhibitions.

Among its activities is the "Hellenic World" Culture Center and Museum (254 Pireos, Tavros) (which includes exhibition spaces, the "Tholos" virtual reality theater, two theater halls with a total capacity of 1400 spectators as well as other educational spaces), virtual reality representations of ancient Greek cities and monuments, as well as the Encyclopedia of the Hellenic World.
