= Agoraios Kolonos =

Hill near the ancient agora of Athens

Coordinates: 37.9750°N 23.7208°E

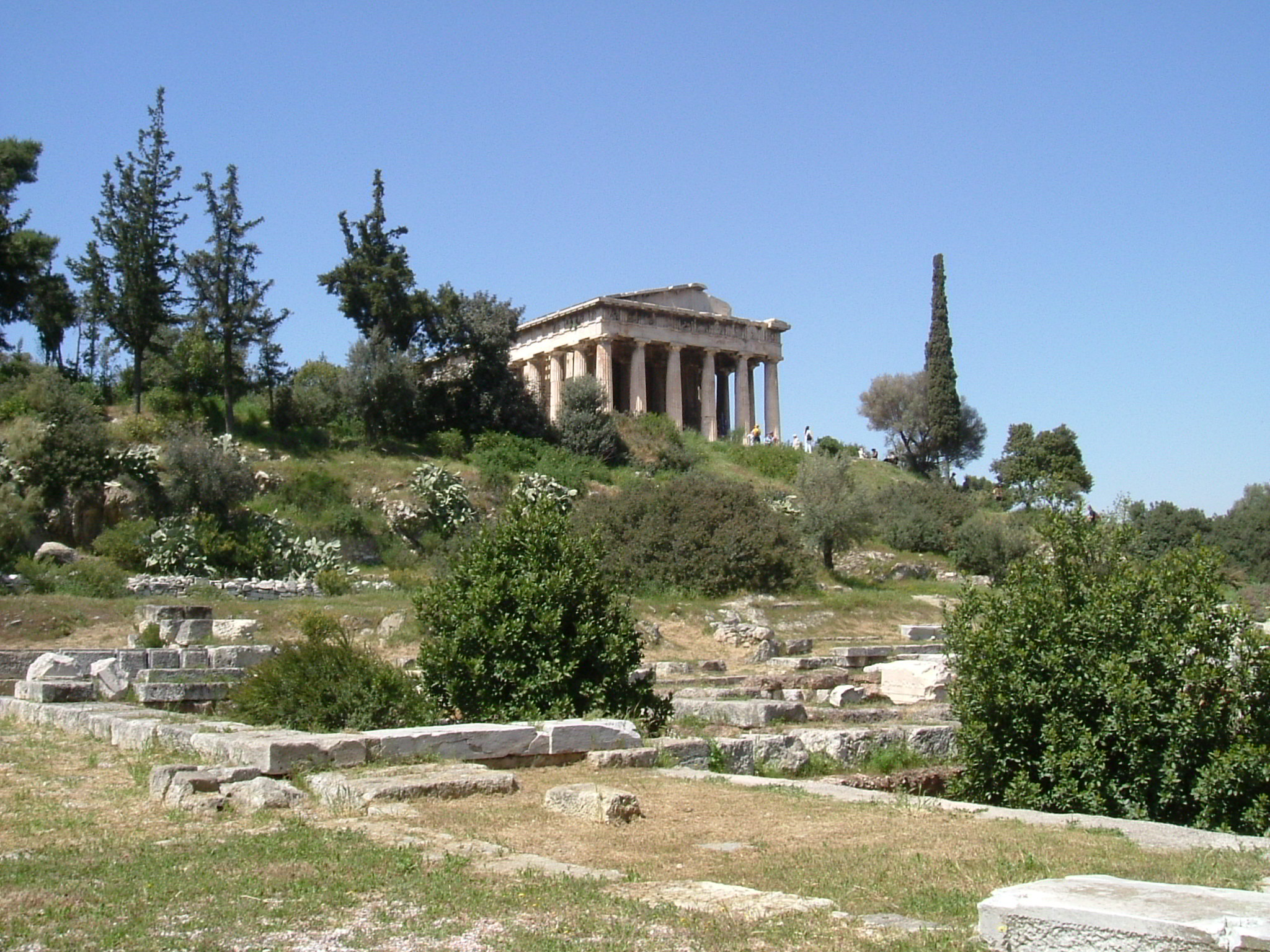

Agoraios Kolonos (/kəˈloʊnɒs/; Ancient Greek: Κολωνός Ἀγοραῖος; Greek: Αγοραίος Κολωνός, meaning "the hill next to the Agora"), located to the south and adjacently situated on a hill near the Temple of Hephaestus, used to be the meeting place of the ancient Athenian craftsmen.

== See also ==
- Ancient Agora of Athens
