= Temple of Ares =

Temple in ancient Athens

Coordinates: 37.9755°N 23.7228°E

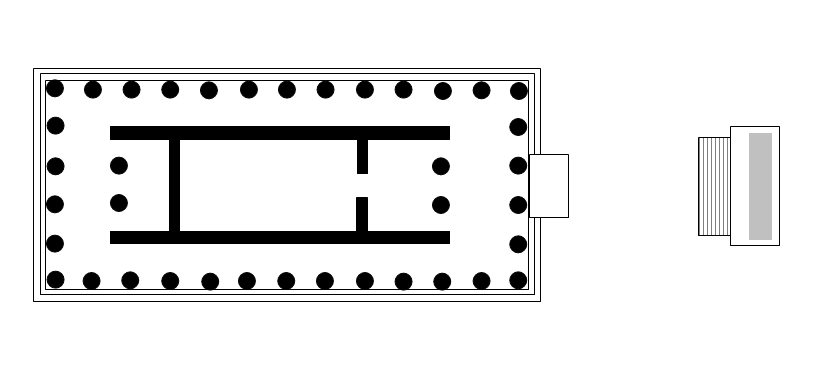
Estimated floor plan of the original Temple of Ares with adjacent altar

The Temple of Ares was a Doric hexastyle peripteral temple dedicated to Ares, located in the northern part of the Ancient Agora of Athens. Fragments from the temple found throughout the Agora enable a full, if tentative, reconstruction of the temple's appearance and sculptural programme. The temple had a large altar to the east and was surrounded by statues. A terrace to the north looked down on the Panathenaic Way. The northwest corner of the temple overlays one of the best-preserved Mycenaean tombs in the Agora, which was in use from ca. 1450-1000 BC.

The temple was originally located at Pallene (modern Gerakas), where it was dedicated to Athena Pallenis and - probably - Apollo. It is one of four temples by the "Theseum architect" and was probably built around 440-436 or 430-425 BC. It is the largest of several "itinerant temples," which were relocated to the Athenian Agora in the age of Augustus. The roof of the temple was spoliated in the second half of the second century AD to build the post-Herulian fortification wall. The sculptures were systematically defaced by Christians in the fifth century AD and the remains of the structure were demolished in the sixth century AD.

The foundations in the Agora were excavated in 1937, with some further work in 1951, after which they were reburied for their protection. Architectural fragments and sculpture have been found scattered throughout the Agora in secondary use. The original foundations remain in situ at Pallene, where they were excavated between 1994 and 1997.

== Temple of Athena Pallenis ==
Original and later location of the temple
1 Temple of Athena Pallenis, Pallene
2 Temple of Ares, Ancient Agora of Athens

The temple originally stood in the sanctuary of Athena Pallenis, where foundations of a temple have been found that match the dimensions of the temple in the Agora. (Note: Dinsmoor originally suggested that it had been relocated from the area of the Roman Agora and had always been a temple of Ares, but was unable to offer any positive evidence for this.Dinsmoor 1940, pp. 51–52; Dinsmoor 1943. Another theory placed the original temple on the Areopagus hill McAllister 1959, p. 64) These foundations are located on the corner of Androutsou and Zalougou streets at modern Stavros in Gerakas, a northeastern suburb of Athens, the location of the ancient deme of Pallene. This site is at the base of Keraies hill, which is named by Euripides as the "sacred hill of Athena Pallenis." The foundations are oriented northwest-southeast, so that they align almost perfectly with Delos. (Note: Stewart et al. 2019, p. 637. Three nearby temples are also aligned with Delos: the Temple of Apollo Zoster at Halae Aexonides, the Temple of Apollo Colonna on Aegina, and the Temple of Apollo Daphnephoros at Eretria.) They are 16.35 metres wide and 35.25 metres long. The southwest and northwest corners of the building are lost and much of the western side of the temple has remained unexcavated because it is under a residential dwelling. The ground is sloped and as a result, the foundations are over 2.53 metres deep at the west end, but only 1 metre deep in parts of the east end. The foundation consists of a series foundation walls which underlay the walls and columns of the superstructure. These foundation walls sit on top of the bedrock. They show that it was a hexastyle Doric temple whose columns, walls, and steps had the same dimensions as the Temple of Ares in the Agora. At the west end of the temple, two small marble fragments were found - one from a broken lion-headed waterspout and the other a narrow piece of marble from the stylobate. No other traces of the superstructure were found, strongly suggesting that the whole structure had been removed and rebuilt elsewhere.

The Temple of Athena Pallenis at Pallene is mentioned in a range of literary and epigraphic sources. Athena was associated with Pallene in several Greek myths, including the slaying of Pallas during the Gigantomachy and the birth of Erichthonius. The mythical king Eurystheus is said to have been buried in front of the temple. The deme had also been the site of Theseus' victory over his cousins, the Pallantidae, which formed the first step in his legendary unification of Attica.

The sanctuary was a key religious site for the four neighbouring demes of Pallene, Acharnae, Gargettus, and Paeania, which together formed a league. The alignment of the temple with Delos and the sculptures of the pronaos and opisthodomos indicate that Apollo was worshipped here alongside Athena. Ares, on the other hand, was not associated with the temple in any way at this stage. Based on features of the superstructure found in the Agora, William Bell Dinsmoor dated the Classical temple to ca. 440-436 BC. Based on features of the sculpture, Andrew Stewart et al. place it ca. 430-425 BC and propose that it was erected in response to the Plague of Athens.

The classical temple of Athena Pallenis was preceded by an archaic temple, which existed at the time of Pisistratus' final seizure of power in 546 BC. An isolated poros triglyph dating to around 650 BC, which was found near the church of St. George in 1927, may derive from this temple. Seventh-century BC figurines that were deposited in the Classical temple's foundations probably also come from the Archaic sanctuary. This archaic templemay have been located to the northeast of the Classical foundations.

=== Transfer ===
The temple was transferred to the Agora and rededicated to Ares during the reign of Augustus. A terracotta bowl found in the foundation packing in the Agora confirms the Augustan date. The mason's marks carved on the blocks to facilitate reassembly of the temple use letter forms which are characteristic of the Augustan age. The temple is aligned with the Odeon of Agrippa, which was built between 15 BC and ca. 13 BC. A drain running north from the Odeon diverts around the temple's altar, showing that the transfer of the temple post-dated the construction of the Odeon around 13 BC.

The temple was first connected to Ares at the time of this transfer. Stewart et al. propose that it continued to be sacred to Athena Pallenis as well, but there is no explicit evidence for this. An inscription on a statue base (IG II^{3} 4, 242) found near the Agora records the dedication of a statue by "the community of Acharnae... as a thank-offering to Ares and Augustus," when one Apollophanes was priest of Ares. This is probably connected in some way with the transfer of the temple to the Agora, since Acharnae was the location of Athens' main cult for Ares from the fourth century BC through the Hellenistic period. A statue base found in the Agora inscribed with a dedication to Gaius Caesar "the New Ares" (IG II^{2} 3250) may have been associated with the temple. Several authors have accordingly suggested that the transfer of the temple was associated with Gaius Caesar's visit to the city in 1 BC or his death in AD 4. Alternatively or additionally, it might be linked with the dedication of the Temple of Mars Ultor in Rome by Augustus in 2 BC.

==== Masons' marks ====
As the temple at Pallene was demolished, a mason's mark was carved on each block, consisting of two or three letters, which would allow it to be placed in its proper location on the new site. Different systems were used for different parts of the building. The marks on the fragments of the crepidoma consist of three letters (e.g. ΓΓΕ, ΕΔΔ, ΨΔΔ). The final letter indicated which side of the building the block came from: Α (Greek aristera, "left"), Δ (Greek dexia, "right"), Ε (Greek eisodos, "entrance"), Ο (oposteros, "rear"), Θ (Greek thyra, "door," referring to the cross-wall containing the front door). The second letter indicated which step the block came from, counting down from Α (top/stylobate), to Δ (fourth step/euthynteria). The first letter listed where the block was located within the course, counting from the leftmost block from the point of view of someone standing outside the temple to the rightmost block. This system was also used for the wall blocks, the columns, the entablature, and the cornice, but the second letter was omitted when this was irrelevant or obvious. (Note: Dinsmoor 1940, pp. 15–18, 29–30–31, 38–39 proposed a slightly different system, which was disproven by subsequent discoveries.)

== Temple in the Agora ==
Plan of the Ancient Agora of Athens in the Roman Imperial period. The Temple of Ares is number 34.

The temple is now located in the northern portion of the Agora, east of the Temple of Apollo Patroos and north of the Odeon of Agrippa, with which it is aligned. An inscription from 99/100 AD mentions in passing that Titus Coponius Maximus was the priest of Ares Enyalius and Enyo (IG II^{2} 1072), which is generally assumed to be the cult based in this temple.

=== Foundations and surrounds ===
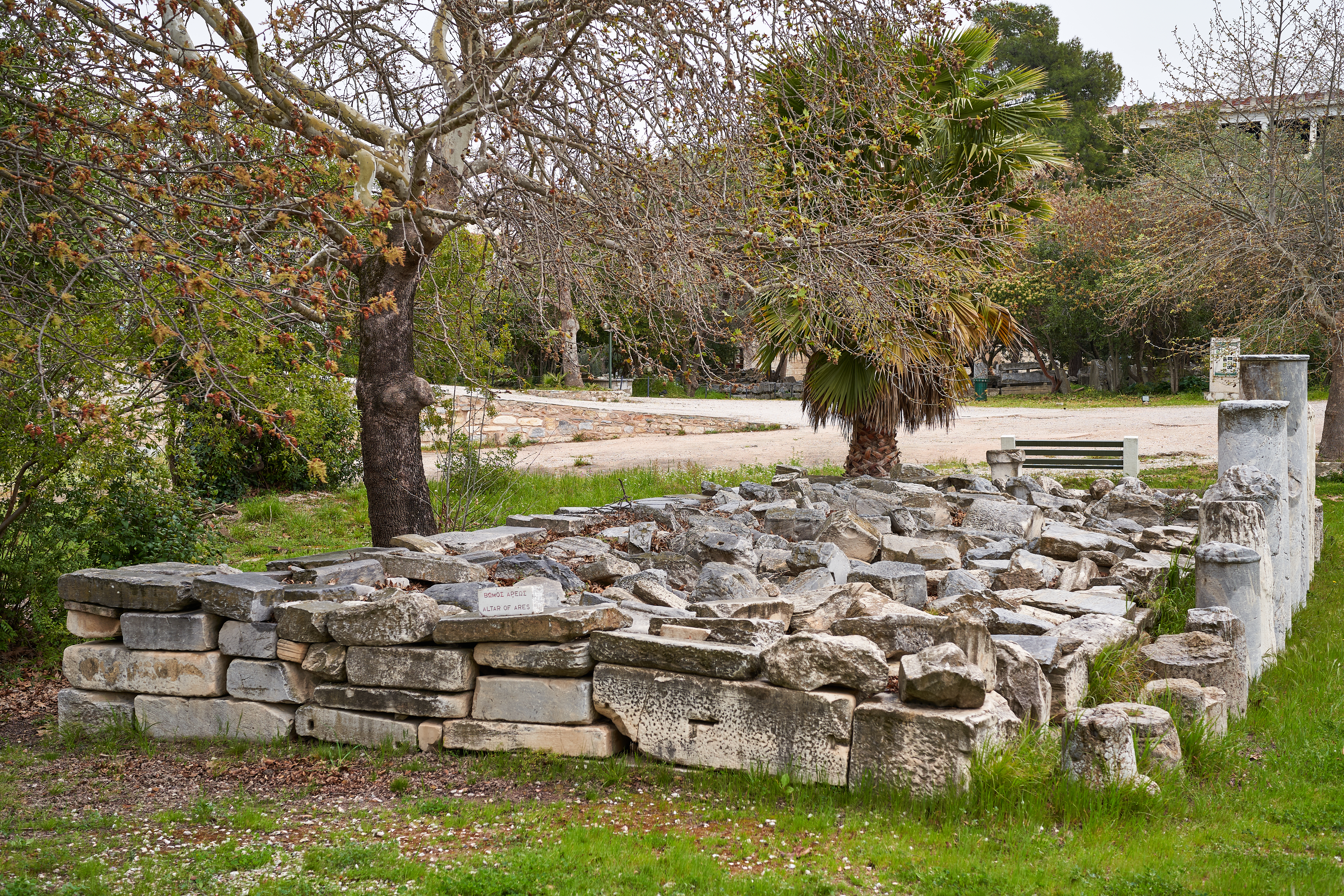
Remains of the altar of the Temple of Ares.

The foundations consist of a packing of broken stone lying on the bedrock, five layers of poros blocks, and a marble euthynteria. These foundations measure 35.032 metres long by 16.202 metres wide. The eastern part remains in situ, the western part was visible only as cuttings in the bedrock. The poros blocks seem to have been spoliated from the Hellenistic Arsenal which was located on the Agora hill and presumably destroyed after the Sack of Athens in 86 BC. In the Athenian Agora, this style of foundation is typical of the early first century AD and the ground level assumed by the foundations matches that of the early Roman period. At the east end of the temple, was a large staircase, 1.30 metres long by 4.7 metres wide, leading up to the front entrance.

There was a terrace along the north side of the temple, which extended north 6.75 from the temple at the west end and 7.50 metres at the east end, supported by a 1.44 metre high retaining wall of recycled poros blocks. This area may have been used for statues and as a viewing platform for watching processions on the Panathenaic Way to the north. A late sixth century BC or early fifth-century BC poros base measuring 2.40x2.40 metres stood north of the eastern end of the temple. The Panathenaic Way bends to go around it, indicating its importance. It is matched by another base on the other side of the Way. Both may have borne herms.

On the south side of the temple there are three large monument bases: one at the western end, one in the middle and one at the east end. The middle one is fourth century BC or Hellenistic in date. The eastern base is made of conglomerate and poros and measures 3.08 x 4.10 metres. It post-dates the Augustan temple.

There is another terrace in front of the temple, extending 8.25 metres to the east. The central area, directly in front of the temple was paved with Hymettan marble slabs. About ten metres east of the temple, in this paved area, there was a large altar, measuring 5.62 metres from east to west and 8.30 metres from north to south. The eastern part is the podium where animals were sacrificed; the western part is a stair case, 2.12 metres long and 7.00 metres wide. It was probably the same height as the stylobate of the temple. A set of orthostates with stone shields carved in relief may have run around the edge of the altar. There was an inscription on a band above them (Ag. I 6634), but it is too fragmentary to read. They were subsequently reused as underpinning for the pavement. A drain running north from the Odeon of Agrippa crosses this area and diverts around the altar A base was erected at the southwest corner of the altar. Another was located to the southeast. A marble block with an iron ring on the top, used as a hitching post for sacrifices was located to the north of the altar, but it was probably related to some earlier structure.

=== Superstructure ===
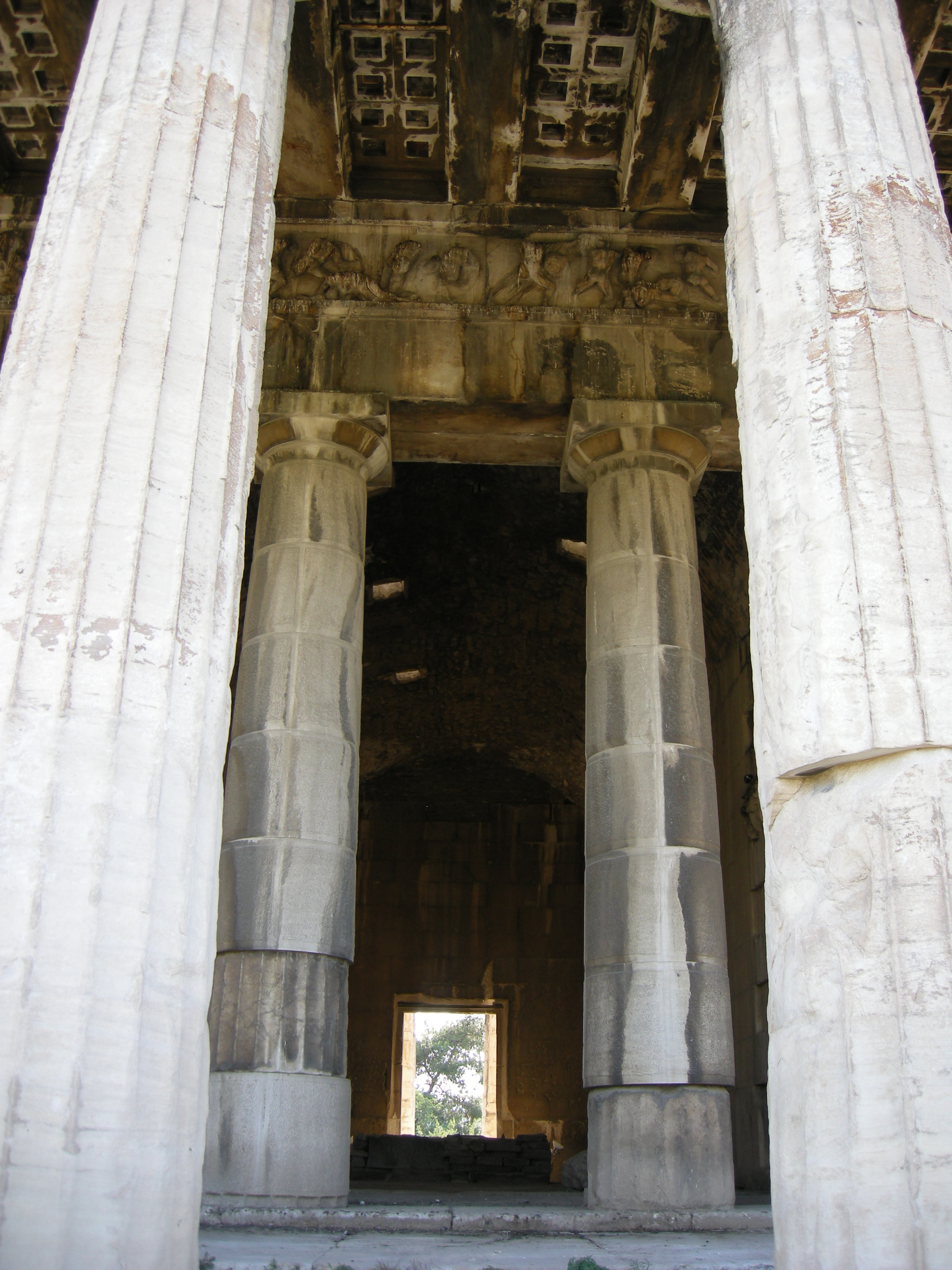
Pronaos of the Temple of Hephaestus, Athens. The bottom drum of the right interior column derives from the Temple of Ares and was incorporated into the Temple of Hephaestus during restoration work in 1937.

Around 230 fragments of the superstructure have been found reused in later structures throughout the Agora. They are now collected at the western end of the temple. They are made of a distinctive crystalline Pentelic marble with gray-green chlorite veins. They can be dated stylistically to the second half of the 5th century BC, probably the 430s BC. The style and dimensions are particularly similar to the Temple of Hephaestus, the Temple of Poseidon at Sounion, and the Temple of Nemesis at Rhamnous. Dinsmoor proposed that all four temples were the work of the same architect, nicknamed the "Theseum architect", who operated between 449 and 432 BC and probably built this temple between ca. 440-436 BC. Mason's marks and dowel holes of Augustan date indicate that the temple originally stood elsewhere and was dismantled, moved, and reconstructed on the Roman foundations.

The dimensions of the foundations and the architectural fragments indicate that the temple was a Doric hexastyle peripteral temple, i.e. it had a colonnade extending around the whole exterior, with six columns at the front and rear ends and thirteen columns along the north and south sides. The pronaos at the eastern end of the temple contained two columns between the antae and a door to the cella and was unusually deep (4.65 metres). It was matched by a shallower, closed opisthodomos at the western end. The whole structure stood atop a three-step crepidoma, which was 1.068 metres high. At the bottom step of the crepidoma, the superstructure was 34.961 metres long by 16.125 metres wide; the building itself was 32.847 long by 14.052 metres wide. The height of the temple from the bottom step to the cornice was about 9.7 metres. The design is similar to the Temple of Hephaestus above the Agora on Agoraios Kolonos hill, but slightly larger.

The columns were fluted with twenty flutes and had an estimated diameter of 1.074 metres at the base and an estimated height of about 6.1 metres. The intercolumniation was 2.685 metres. From top to bottom, the Doric entablature consisted of an architrave (probably 0.847 metres high), a row of triglyphs (0.838 metres high and 0.536-0.537 metres wide, except for the corner triglyphs which were 0.555 metres wide) and metopes (0.806 metres wide), and a taenia with white or gilt guttae (0.344 metres high) on a blue background. It is unclear whether the metopes bore any sculpture; no candidates for metope sculpture have been found. Above this was a raking cornice and raking simas decorated with painted lotus and palmette designs and lion's head waterspouts. The roof was made of Pentelic marble tiles. Three marble ceiling beams, eight fragments of ceiling beams, and more than eighty marble coffers from the internal ceiling survive. Each coffer is a simple concave vault surrounded by an ovolo moulding. The vaults were painted blue, with a red circle in the centre surrounded by sixteen yellow rays, and red and green stripes around the edge. The ovolo was painted with a pattern of blue eggs, red darts, and gold shells, all on a blue background, and surrounded by a gold and blue band, a red stripe, a green stripe, an unpainted stripe, and a red band. These coffers were probably located in the pronaos.

=== Sculpture ===
The Agora excavations discovered large amounts of sculptural fragments, some of which can be attributed to the temple. These attributions are based on the use of Pentelic marble, stylistic dating to the late fifth century BC, whether the scale of the pieces matches the reconstructed dimensions of the temple, patterns of weathering (interior sculpture should be unweathered), and whether they are thematically appropriate for a temple Athena Pallenis (according to Hölscher's Law, the sculptural themes of a temple were chosen to "provide a sculpted frame for [its] cult"). Relief sculptures were often carved in a summary fashion on surfaces that would not be visible from the ground and had attachment points for connecting them to the structure. Findspots near the temple are sometimes indicative. Some pieces include restorations of Augustan date, associated with the transfer of the temple to the Agora.

==== Acroteria ====
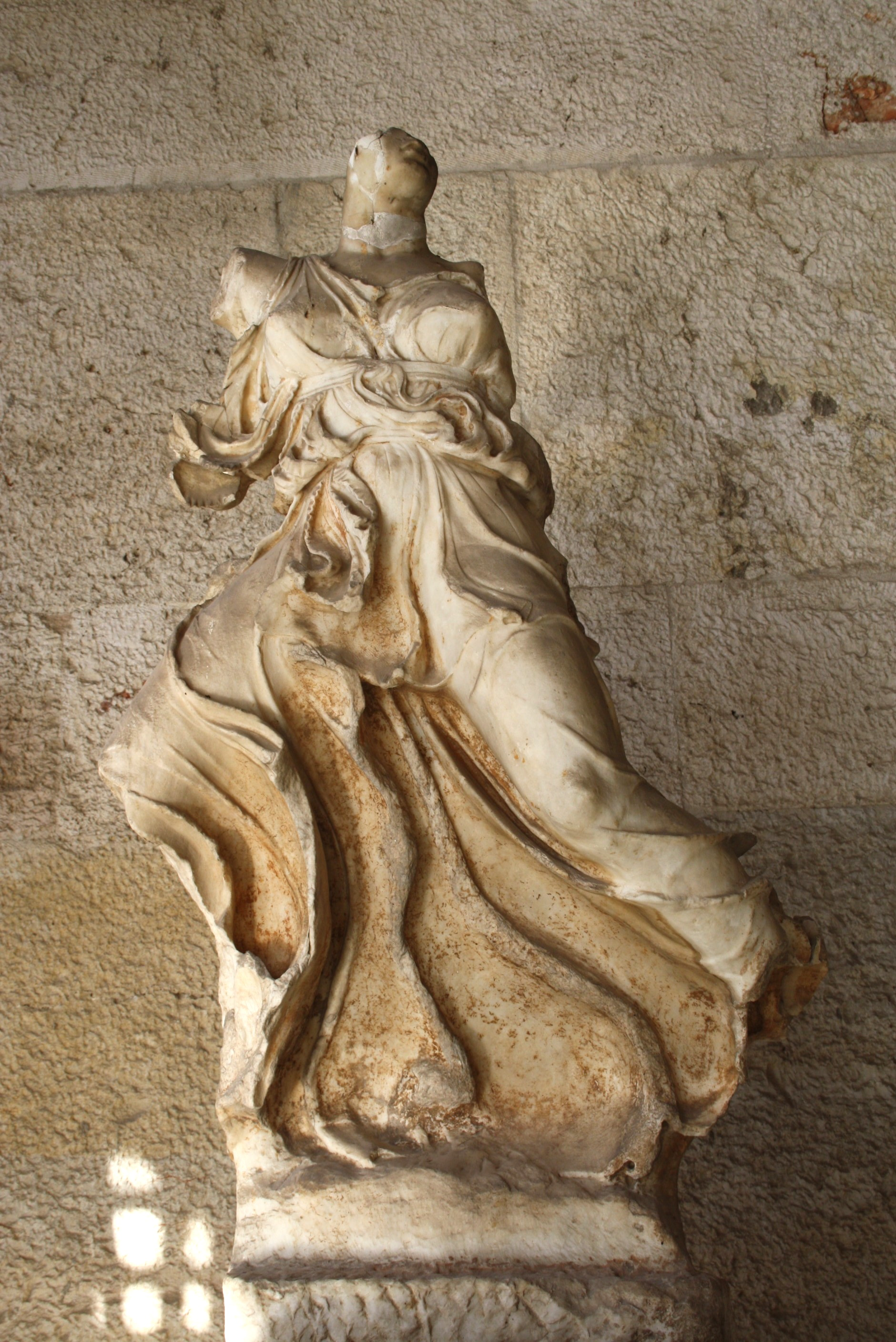
Sculpture of Nike (inv. 312), probably the northwestern corner acroterion of the temple.

The central eastern acroterion was a marble sculpture of a female figure in a Doric chiton. The head, forearms, and right lower leg are lost. The preserved remnants stand 1.10 metres high, but the original height would have been 1.35 metres. Most of the sculpture is in the National Archaeological Museum, Athens (inv. NM 1732); parts of the left leg are in the Agora Museum (inv. S 1539). She may have held a fragmentary shield (inv. S 2489). The style of the drapery suggests a date in the 430s-420s BC, but with substantial restorations in the Augustan period. The design is similar to sculptures of Nike, but she has no wings, so is probably Hebe, the goddess of youth, but Hygieia is also possible. The eastern corner acroteria were Nereids riding dolphins, one of which is in Athens (inv. NM 3397 + 4798) and the other in the National Archaeological Museum, Naples (no inventory number). The pair are symmetrical, stood 1.10 metres high and date to the 390s BC, which makes them significantly smaller and later than the other sculptures on the temple. They were probably added to the temple when it was transferred to the Agora in the Augustan period, perhaps as a reference to the naval victory at the Battle of Actium.

The central western acroterion was also female, but only the head (Agora inv. S 373) is certainly preserved. Stewart et al. suggest that she was Iris, goddess of the rainbow and messenger of the gods. The western corner acroteria were statues of Nike. The southwestern Nike of these is preserved only as an arm (Agora inv. S 312 Θ). The northwestern (inv. S 312) is complete except for the upper part of her head, her wings, arms, and parts of her legs. She originally stood 1.38 metres high and was depicted running to the right, with her arms raised and her head turned to look left. Stylistically, she is dated around 425 BC. Scholars initially attributed her to the nearby Stoa of Zeus, but she is too big for this setting and shows traces of Augustan period restorations similar to other sculptures from the temple. In the original context at Pallene, this western set of acroteria would have been more visible from the road.

==== Pediment ====
The east and west facades each had a pediment containing a triangular relief that was 12.633 metres wide and 1.507 metres high. The figures would have been about 1.25-1.35 metres high. It is difficult to determine whether sculptural fragments belonged to the pediment of this temple or the nearby Hephaisteion, since the two temples are of similar dimensions and date, but the fragments of the temple of Ares are made of Pentelic marble and those of the Hephaisteion are made of Parian marble. Six fragments have been identified, three from each end.

The fragments from the east pediment consist of a head of Athena in a triple-crested Attic helmet, the torso and upper legs of a nude man in a contraposto pose, and the thighs of a seated or reclining woman in drapery. (Note: Agora inv. S 789, S 1313, S 2252) The male torso appears to bear the same type of mason's marks as the architectural fragments from the temple. This is probably a scene of Athena "in her most formal "official" role as city goddess of Athens" meeting with a male figure, who is probably Theseus, about to set out to confront the invading Pallantidae. The battle was probably depicted in the metopes below.

The fragments of the west pediment consist of another head of Athena in an Attic helmet, the torso and upper legs of a statue of Athena in drapery with a gorgoneion around her neck, and the upper torso of a reclining male. (Note: Agora inv. S 1098, S 1232, S 147) The torso of Athena has a pair of mason's marks on her shoulders. It seems that Athena stood in the centre of the scene and was turning her head to address someone. The Attic helmet suggests that she did so in her role as city goddess. This may be a scene of the Athenians setting out to fight the invading Amazons, depicted in the metopes below.

==== Metopes ====
Most of the metopes on the east and west faces of the temple were 83.8 cm high and 80.15 cm wide, except for the two outermost metopes at each end, which measured 83.2 by 83.8 cm. Stewart et al. identify nine fragments with appropriate dimensions. (Note: East face: Agora inv. S 1564, S 1743, S 1372, S 1373, S 2025. West face: Agora inv. S 303, S 1417, S 2274, S 1521.) The fragments of the east face consist of five nude male torsos, in poses which suggest that they were engaged in battle. Stewart et al. propose that these depict Theseus and the Athenians defeating his cousins, the Pallantidae, near Pallene. Theseus probably also appeared in the pedimental scene above the metopes. The fragments of the west face consist of a male head, a female head, and two fragments with parts of a nude male killing a nude woman. These clearly belong to an Amazonomachy.

==== High-relief frieze ====
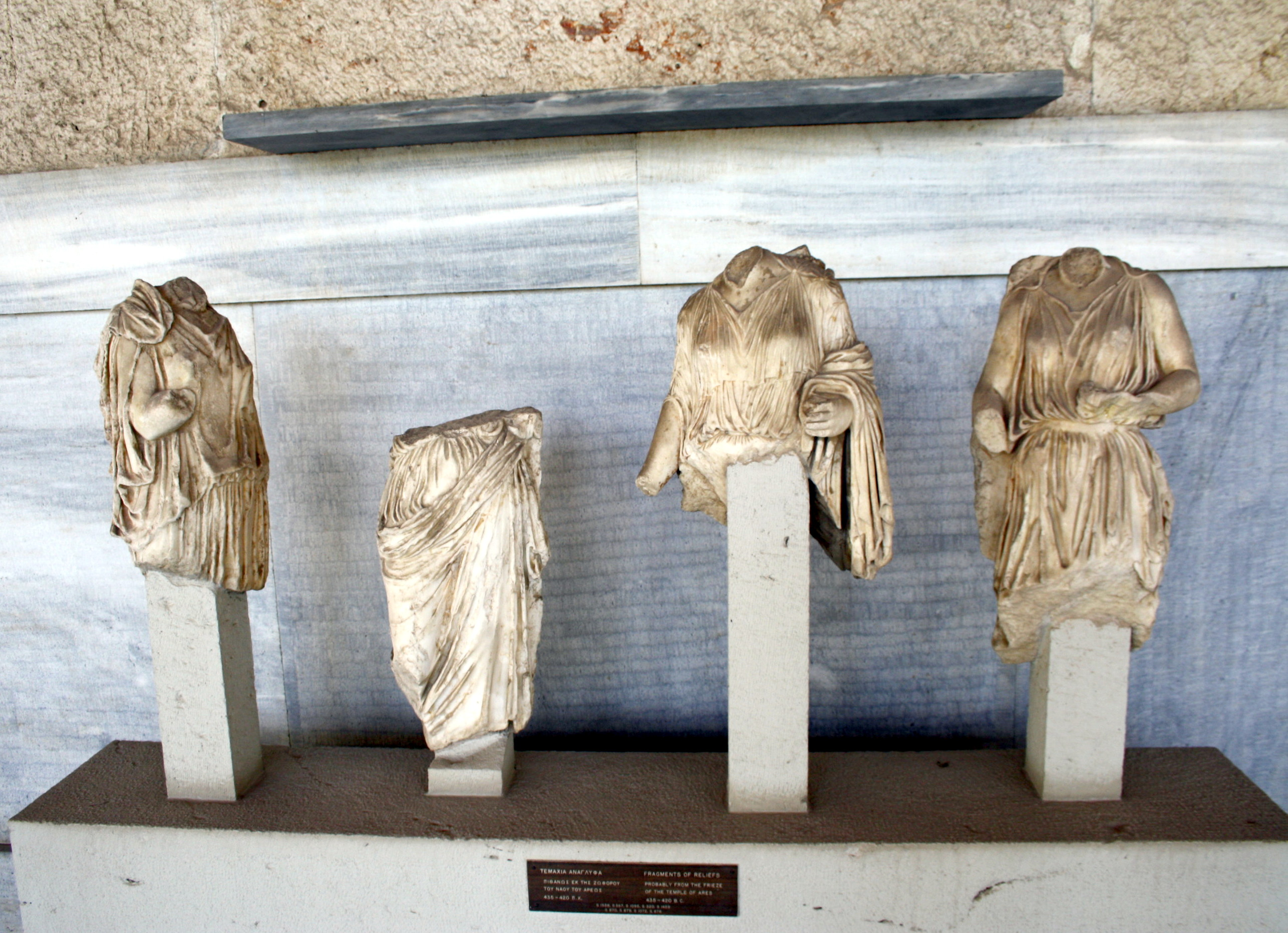
Sculptural fragments, from the high relief frieze, now displayed in the Stoa of Attalos. From left to right: female torso in an Argive peplos (inv. S 870); lower part of an unidentified female figure in chiton and himation; female torso in a himation and an Argive peplos (inv. S 676); female torso in Attic peplos (inv. S 1072).

The high-relief frieze, consists of 49 sculptural fragments of Pentelic marble at half life-size, which were found scattered throughout the Agora. The fragments include 26 heads and 6 torsos, indicating that there were at least 26 figures, of which at least 11 were male and at least 14 female. At least two of the figures were seated. One of the female torsos has drapery with the same pattern as the cult statue of Athena by Locrus which stood inside the temple. None of the preserved males are naked or fully dressed. There is also a hand holding cloth, a fragment of drapery, 1 arm, 10 feet, and 1 pair of sheep. A few fragments show signs of paint.

In 1951 they were identified as parts of a single fifth-century BC frieze, which was dubbed the "Agora High-relief frieze". It is clear that they belong to the pronaos and opisthodomos friezes of a temple, because they are designed to stand above eye level, because of their number and size, because they divide into two different styles (one for the pronaos and one for the opisthodomos), and they have no plinths or moldings (these would have been separate). They were definitively associated with the Temple of Ares in 2019. This is demonstrated by the scale of the fragments, their findspots, which cluster around the east and west facades of the temple.

Both friezes were ca. 83.5 centimetres high. The pronaos frieze, at the east end of the temple, was 12 metres long. This seems to have shown Amphitrite, Poseidon and Athena at left, facing Apollo, an enthroned Zeus, and Hera at right. Other fragments may depict Artemis, Leto, Aphrodite, and Hephaestus. The scene was probably Apollo's arrival at Pallene and incorporation into the local cult. The opisthodomos frieze at the west end was 8 metres long. This frieze appears to have depicted the prototypical sacrifice to Athena and Apollo at the first celebration of their annual festival. The pair are seated at the centre with their backs to one another and a scene of sacrifice between them (of which no fragments remain). To the left of Athena is a standing Nike and a seated Heracles. To the right of Apollo were a standing Leto and a seated Artemis. At the far left and right ends of the frieze were a pair of sheep being brought to the sacrifice. Sculptures of Ares, Aphrodite, and perhaps Eros are not certainly located.

Stylistically, the sculptures show particular affinities to the east frieze of the Parthenon, the east frieze of the Hephaisteion, the base of Nemesis at Rhamnus, and the east frieze and temple parapet of the Temple of Athena Nike. These parallels indicate a date ca. 430-425 BC. Multiple sculptors worked on different figures within the frieze. When the temple was transferred to the Agora, the friezes were disassembled by chiselling out the feet and then levering the blocks out with a crowbar. Two of the fragments are Roman-period repairs; one of these was left unfinished.

==== Cella ====
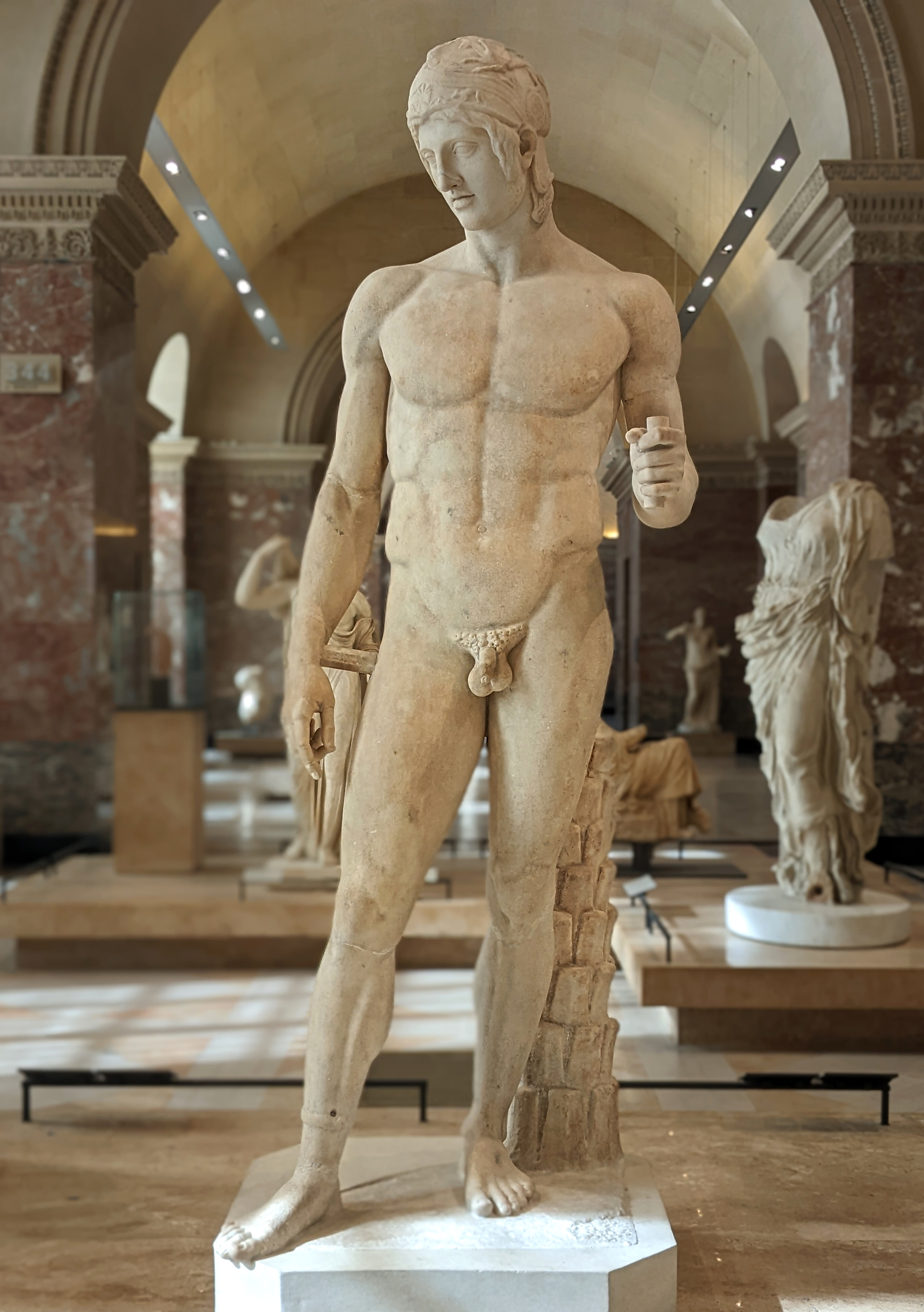
The Borghese Ares, often identified as a copy of the Ares of Alcamenes.

Pausanias states that the temple contained:

two images of Aphrodite, one of Ares made by Alcamenes, and one of Athena made by a Parian of the name of Locrus. There is also an image of Enyo, made by the sons of Praxiteles.

— Pausanias, Description of Greece 1. 8. 4 (trans. Jones)

Alcamenes was active ca. 440-400. The Borghese Ares, now in the Louvre (inv. Ma 866), has been identified as a copy of his statue of Ares since the nineteenth century. This statue of a beardless young man is naked and stands contraposto with his weight on his left foot, his right arm by his side. His left arm holds a spear, but this is an early modern restoration; the original left hand probably held a shield and perhaps a spear. He wears a pseudo-attic helmet decorated with griffins, palmettes and two cats. A ring around his right ankle is probably a shackle, intended to insure that victory in war remained always with the Athenians. This motif occurs in various late 5th century depictions of Ares at Athens. Numerous other copies of this statue are known from the Roman period. One of these copies was found in fragments in the Agora (inv. S 475a-e) in packing behind the Bouleuterion screen wall, where it was deposited after weathering ca. 10-20 AD. Andrew Stewart proposes that the original stood in the Aglaureion, This would have been a bronze statue. This could have been transferred to the Temple of Ares when it was built under Augustus. The statue's pseudo-Attic helmet is an Augustan-period feature, perhaps added during the move due to damage to the original or for stylistic reasons.

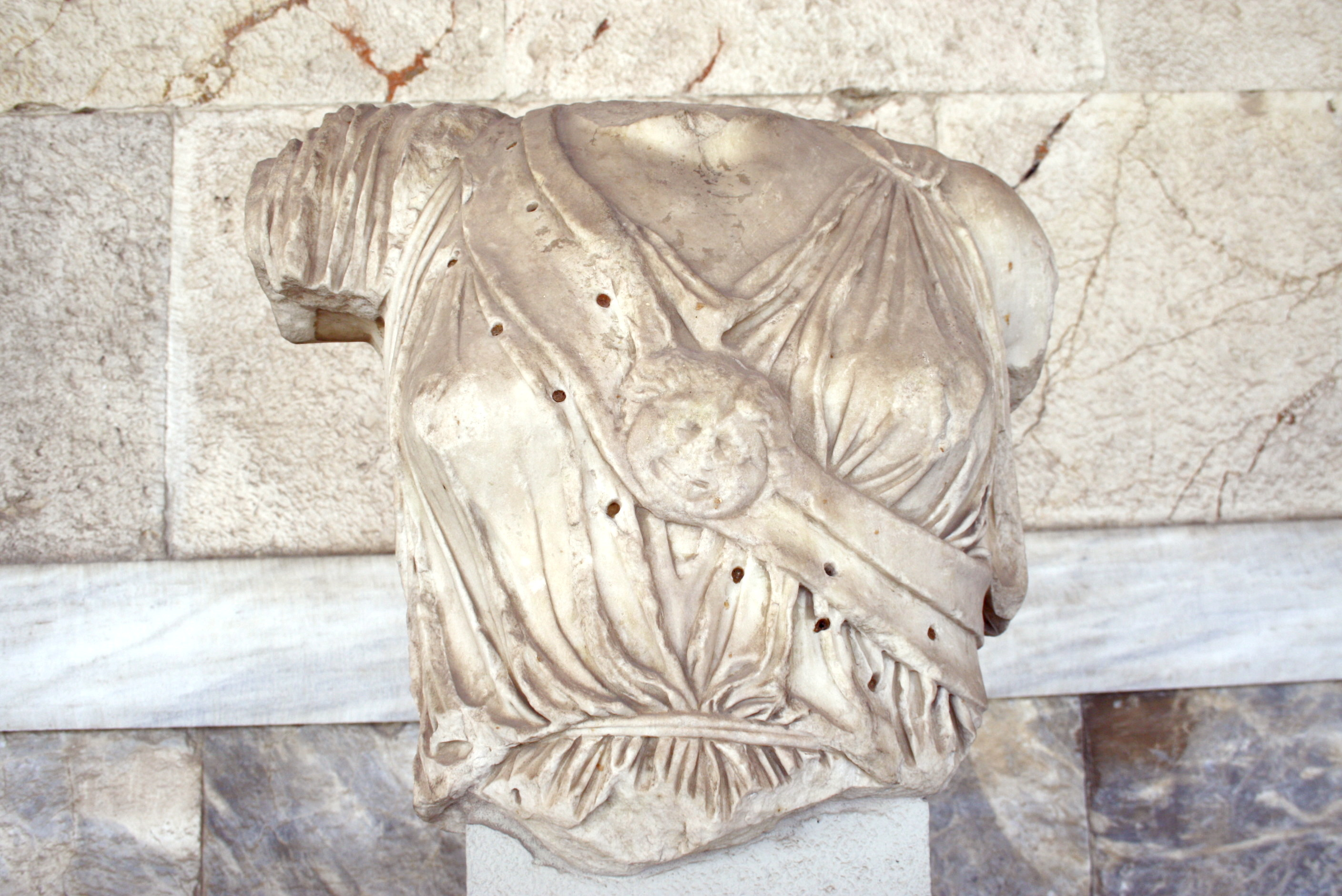
Torso of Athena (inv. S 654), identified as the statue by Locrus of Paros, associated with the temple.

Evelyn Byrd Harrison and Stewart proposes that the statue of Athena by Locrus of Paros was the cult statue of Athena Pallenis from the original temple. Stewart argues that the statue of Athena by Locrus of Paros is a marble torso of Athena (inv. S 654), which was found in a Byzantine well to the south of the temple. A modified copy of the statue (with a head from a different prototype) is known from the Temple of Al-Lat at Palmyra. The statue would originally have been around 2.3 metres tall, including her helmet and dates to ca. 435-430 BC. She wore a long chiton, knotted at her waist. Her aegis was a band running across her chest from her right shoulder to her left hip, with the gorgoneion in the centre and metal snakes erupting from its edges (the surviving torse has holes into which these were inserted). She held a shield on her left arm and a spear upright in her right hand. Various features of this statue's drapery are shared with the statue of Athena from the pronaos or opisthodomos (inv. S 1072) and by an image of her known from Paros, suggesting that they are products of the same artist. A lewis hole on the left shoulder may have been cut to allow the workmen to transfer the statue to the Agora. Harrison instead identifies Locrus' statue with the Athena Giustiniani.

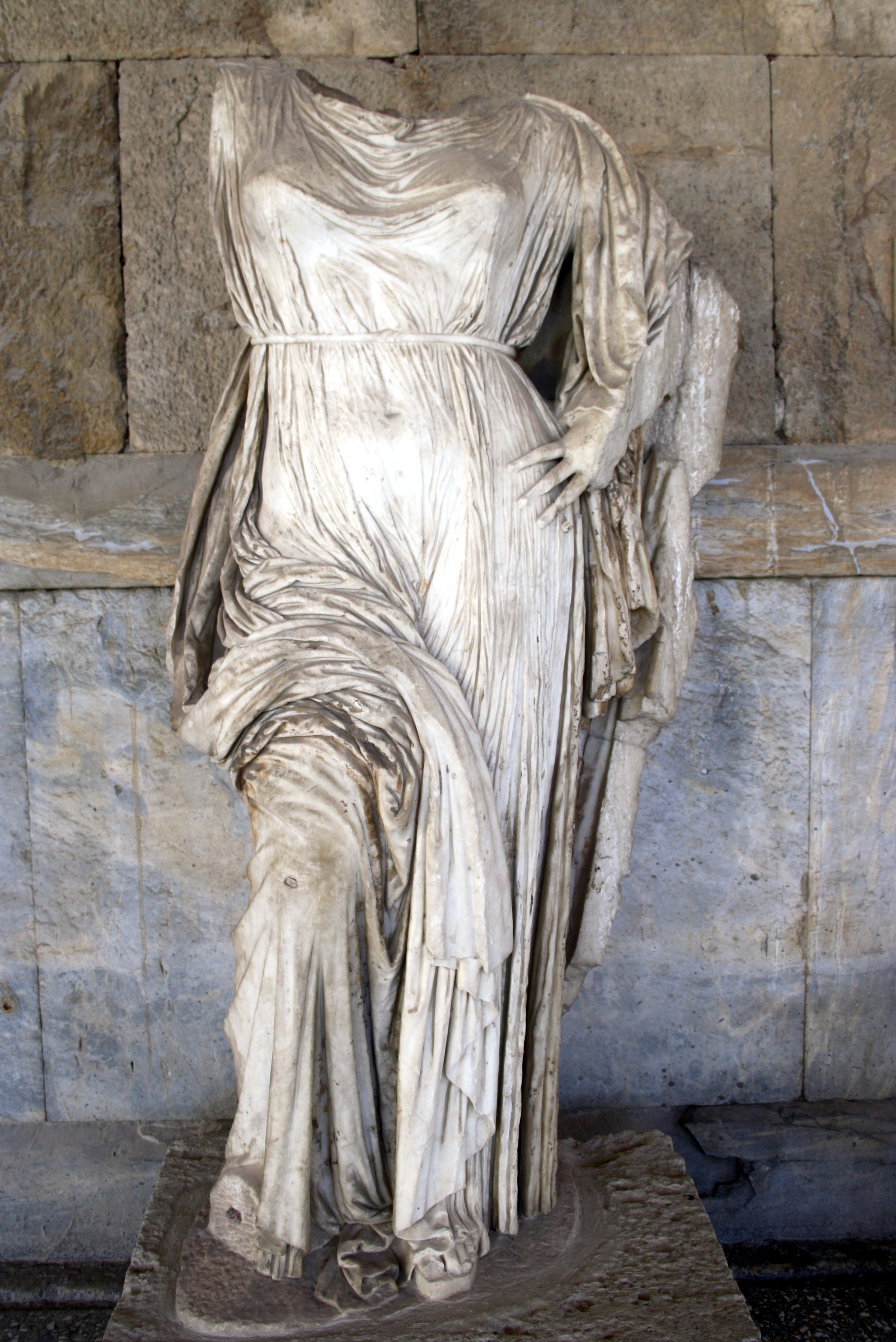
Female torso (inv. S 378), identified as one of the statues of Aphrodite associated with the Temple, originally the cult statue of Aphrodite Hegemone in the Sanctuary of the People and the Graces.

The Athena and Ares might have stood at the end of the cella as the main cult images of the sanctuary, perhaps flanked by the two images of Aphrodite mentioned by Pausanias. These have been identified with two female torsos (inv. S 1882 and S 378) found in the post-Herulian wall with architectural fragments of the temple. These statues are on the same scale and mirror each other, since the first rests her weight on her right foot, holds something (probably a sceptre) in her left hand, and leans left, while the latter rests her weight on her left foot, leans right and could have held a sceptre in her (lost) right hand. The former is a classical statue from around 420 BC, probably made by "Master A", one of the sculptors who worked on the parapet of the Temple of Athena Nike. The latter dates to the third century BC and is probably the statue of Aphrodite Hegemone from the Sanctuary of the People and the Graces. In the Augustan context, the statue of Ares would have been linked with Augustus' patron Mars Ultor, the Athena with Minerva, and the two statues of Aphrodite with Venus as ancestor of Augustus' family, the Gens Julia.

=== Destruction ===
Beams and coffers from the roof of the temple were spoliated around between ca. 270 and 300 AD for use as building material for the Post-Herulian Wall, along with the two statues of Aphrodite. The temple may have already been damaged during the Herulian Sack of Athens in 267 AD, like many other structures in the Agora. The statue of Athena from the west pediment seems to have been damaged and dumped at this time. The rest of the structure seems to have been intact at the beginning of the fifth century, when a rectangular building with concrete foundations was built directly north of the temple and its eastern end formed one of the edges of the north courtyard of the Palace of the Giants. At this time, Christians "systematically defaced" the sculptures and removed the breasts from the female ones. At some point in the sixth century AD, the remains of the temple were demolished, the sculptures were removed, their heads were chopped off, and many of them were burnt in lime kilns. This may have happened following Justinian's edicts closing the Academy (529-531) or after the Slavic sack of Athens in 582 AD. After this, the foundations were covered over with silt from the Eridanos. The altar was heavily damaged by the construction of two storage pits in the Byzantine period and a well in the Ottoman period.

== Mycenaean tomb ==
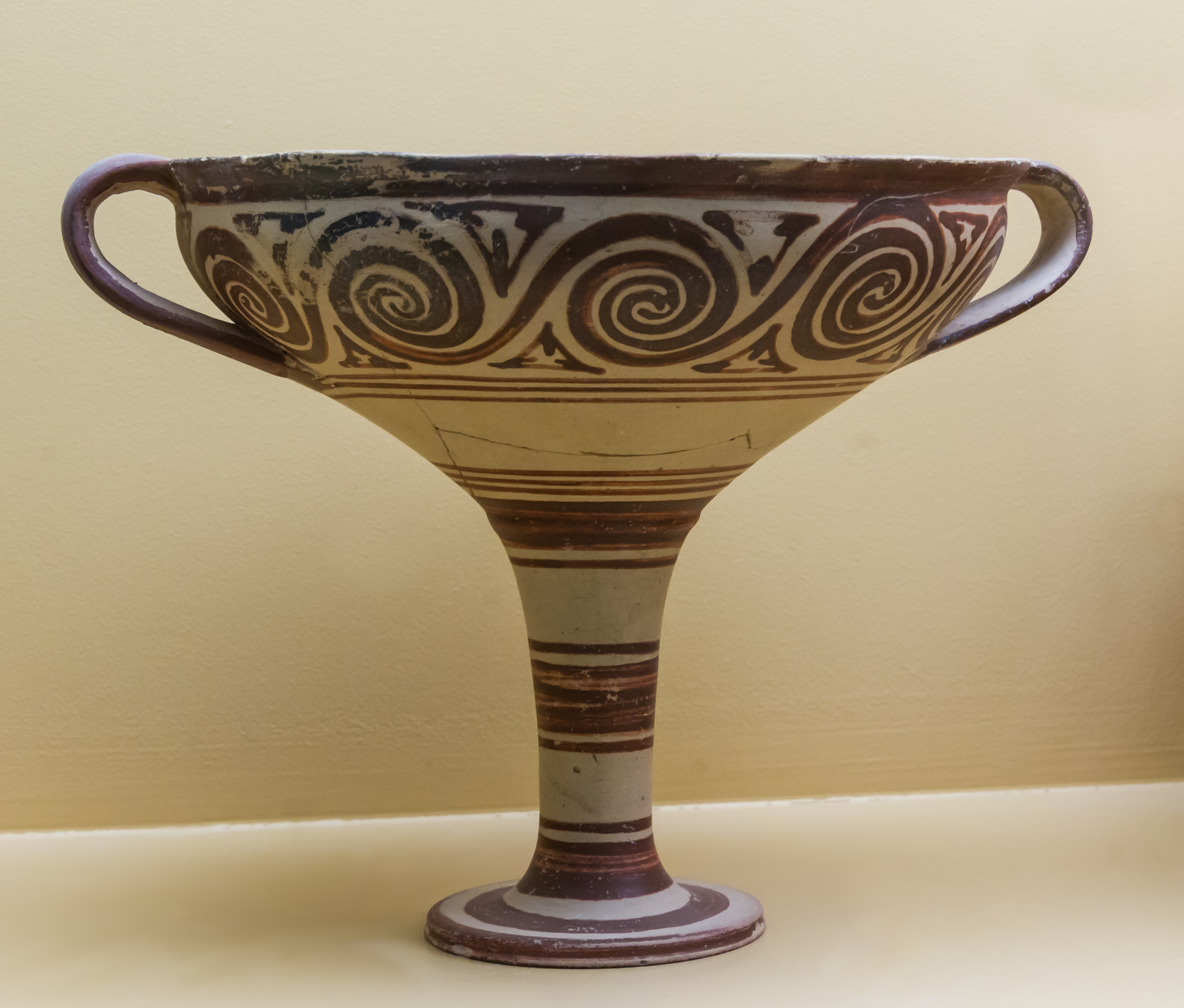
Stemmed kylix (inv. P 21243), Late Helladic IIIA, probably early 1400s BC, with a spiral pattern derived from Minoan models, found in the Mycenaean chamber tomb under the Temple of Ares.

Underneath the northwest corner of the temple in the Agora is a Mycenaean chamber tomb. Such tombs have been found throughout the Agora, but this is one of the better-preserved examples and it has a number of unusual features. It was used for 14-16 burials from ca. 1450 to ca. 1200 BC (Late Helladic II-III). The tomb consisted of a roughly triangular room cut into the bedrock, with corners at west, east, and north. It measured about 2.00 metres east-west, 2.85 metres north-south and was about 1.00 metres high. There was a square niche measuring 0.50x0.50 metres in the southwest corner. Unusually, there are two access corridors (dromoi). The original one runs east-west, terminating in a small door 0.80 metres wide at southwest corner of the burial chamber. The second dromos is located on the northeast side of chamber and runs northeast-southeast. It is short, narrow, and steep (1.58 metres long x 0.75 metres wide) and its doorway is only 0.59 metres wide. It appears to continue to the southeast past the door of the burial chamber. It appears to have been cut later, perhaps because the original dromos had become blocked.

Five or more bodies were buried on the floor of the tomb with Late Helladic II-IIIA pottery (ca. 1450-1400 BC). The bones were then swept aside and three more bodies were interred with Late Helladic IIIA pottery (ca. 1400 BC), Nine arrowheads were found inside the skull of the last of these, probably from a quiver that had become lodged in it as the body decomposed, rather than from war wounds. These bodies were covered with 0.40 metres of sand and then another six or seven bodies were buried in the northeast part of the tomb with Late Helladic IIIB-C pottery and beads (ca. 1300-1200 BC). In the protogeometric period (ca. 1000 BC), the tomb was reopened and one or more cremated bodies were buried in the chamber. A five-year-old boy was buried in a pit dug in the western dromos shortly after this. It is possible that all of these burials belonged to a single long-lived family.

Shortly after 480 BC workmen accidentally broke into the burial chamber, disturbing one of the skeletons. They deposited seven funerary lekythoi under the skeleton's knees and resealed the tomb. Two more lekythoi, deposited by the west door around 430 BC, may result from a second disturbance. The chamber was breached during the construction of the temple of Ares. The late Roman building was built directly over the tomb but did not damage it. These interventions destroyed both dromoi and the upper southern part of the burial chamber, but the rest of the tomb was unaffected.

== Excavation ==
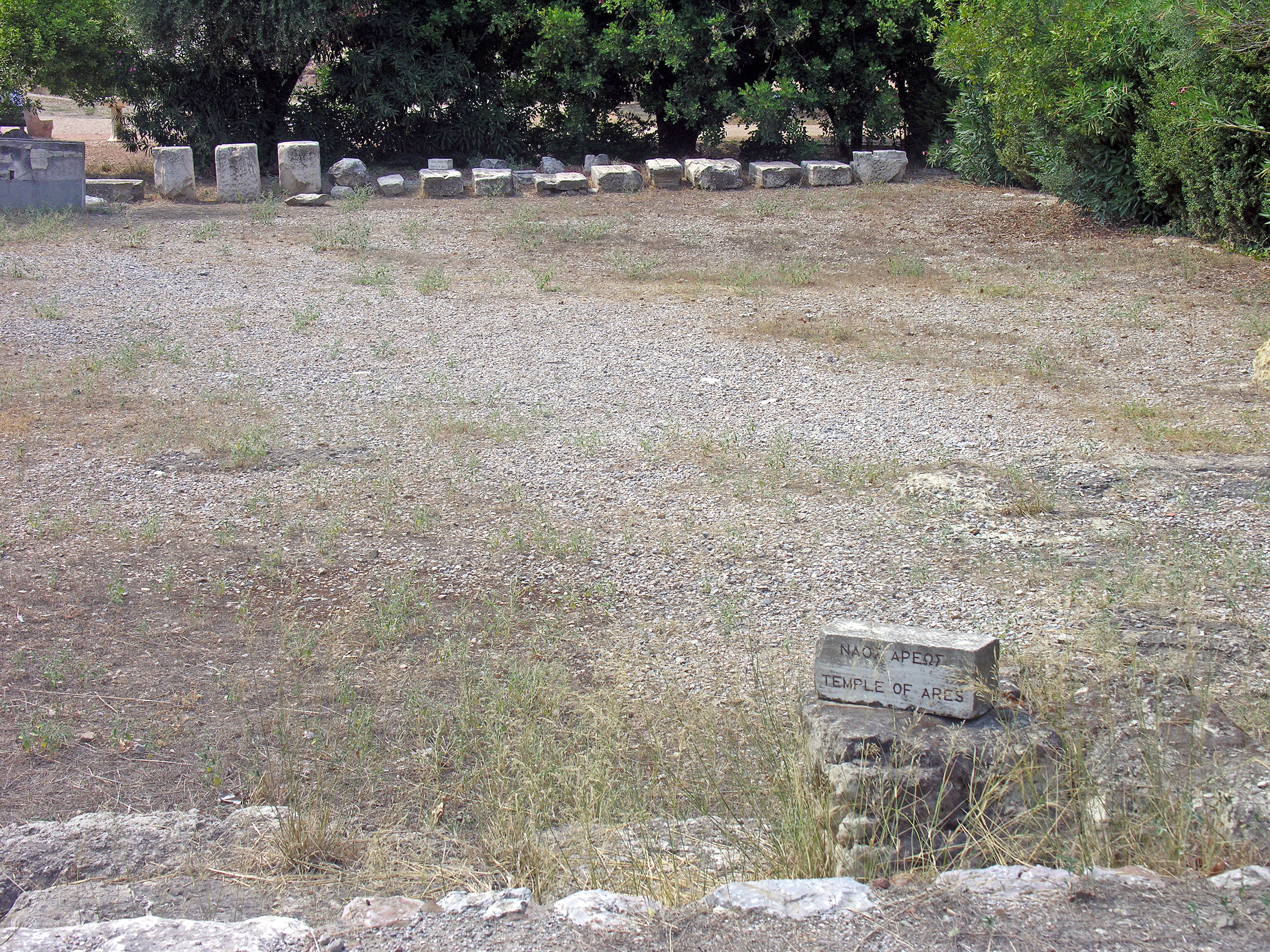
The area of the Temple of Ares in the Ancient Agora of Athens, now reburied, looking west.

The temple of Ares was uncovered as part of the Agora excavations, which the American School of Classical Studies initiated in 1931 under the leadership of Homer Thompson. A triglyph from the temple was found during the first season and various architectural fragments were uncovered in the following years. The temple's foundations were uncovered in 1937 and the initial reconstruction of the temple from the fragments was produced by William Bell Dinsmoor.

The structure was reburied in 1951, because the pit tended to fill with water during the winter. Margaret Crosby and Gerald F. Sullivan supervised this process and further excavations undertaken to the north and east of the temple. The Mycenaean tomb was excavated during this season by Emily Townsend. Blocks from the superstructure were used to mark the outline of the temple.

Most of the acroterion sculpture was uncovered due north of the temple during the construction of the Athens-Piraeus Electric Railway in 1891. Smaller fragments from the leg were uncovered near the temple in 1951, confirming the connection to the structure. The main body is now kept in the National Archaeological Museum of Athens (inv. 1732). The pediment sculptures were discovered in 1950 and 1951.

The original foundations of the temple at Pallenis were uncovered during rescue excavations at Stavros in 1994, carried out by the 2nd ephorate of Prehistoric and Classical Antiquities, under the leadership of Manolis Korres.

== Bibliography ==
- Dinsmoor, William Bell (1940). "The Temple of Ares at Athens". Hesperia: The Journal of the American School of Classical Studies at Athens. 9 (1): 1–52. doi:10.2307/146631. ISSN 0018-098X. JSTOR 146631.
- Dinsmoor, William Bell (1943). "The Temple of Ares and the Roman Agora". American Journal of Archaeology. 47 (4): 383–384. doi:10.2307/499828. ISSN 0002-9114. JSTOR 499828. S2CID 191403795.
- Thompson, Homer A. (1949). "The Pedimental Sculpture of the Hephaisteion". Hesperia: The Journal of the American School of Classical Studies at Athens. 18 (3): 230–268. ISSN 0018-098X. JSTOR 146756.
- Thompson, Homer A. (1951). "Excavations in the Athenian Agora: 1950". Hesperia: The Journal of the American School of Classical Studies at Athens. 20 (1): 45–60. doi:10.2307/146906. JSTOR 146906.
- Thompson, Homer A. (1952). "Excavations in the Athenian Agora: 1951". Hesperia: The Journal of the American School of Classical Studies at Athens. 21 (2): 83–113. doi:10.2307/146780. ISSN 0018-098X. JSTOR 146780.
- Boulter, Patricia Neils (1953). "An Akroterion from the Temple of Ares in the Athenian Agora". Hesperia: The Journal of the American School of Classical Studies at Athens. 22 (3): 141–147. ISSN 0018-098X. JSTOR 146761.
- Townsend, Emily D. (1955). "A Mycenaean Chamber Tomb under the Temple of Ares". Hesperia: The Journal of the American School of Classical Studies at Athens. 24 (3): 187–219. doi:10.2307/147071. ISSN 0018-098X. JSTOR 147071.
- Gottlieb, Carla (1957). "The Pediment Sculpture and Acroteria from the Hephaisteion and Temple of Ares in the Agora at Athens". American Journal of Archaeology. 61 (2): 161–165. doi:10.2307/500354. ISSN 0002-9114. JSTOR 500354. S2CID 193099843.
- McAllister, Marian Holland (1959). "The Temple of Ares at Athens: A Review of the Evidence". Hesperia: The Journal of the American School of Classical Studies at Athens. 28 (1): 1–64. doi:10.2307/147338. ISSN 0018-098X. JSTOR 147338.
- Harrison, Evelyn B. (1986). "The Classical High-Relief Frieze from the Athenian Agora". In Kyrieleis, H. (ed.). Archaische und klassische griechische Plastik. Akten des internationalen Kolloquiums vom 22.– 25. April 1985 in Athen 2: Klassische griechische Plastik. Mainz. pp. 109–117.
- Platonos-Yota, M. (1997). "The Sanctuary of Athena Pallenis". Archaiologia. 65: 92–97.
- Korres, Manolis (1992–1998). "Από τον Σταυρο στην Αγορά". ΗΟΡΟΣ. 10–12: 83–104.
- Camp II, John McK. (2003) The Athenian Agora: A Short Guide to the Excavations. The American School of Classical Studies at Athens. ISBN 0-87661-643-0.
- Harrison, Evelyn B. (2005). "Athena at Pallene and in the Agora of Athens". In Barringer, J. M.; Hurwit, J. M.; Pollitt, J. J. (eds.). Periklean Athens and Its Legacy: Problems and Perspectives. Austin: University of Texas Press. pp. 119–131. ISBN 0292706227.
- Rose, Charles Brian (2005). "The Parthians in Augustan Rome". American Journal of Archaeology. 109 (1): 21–75. doi:10.3764/aja.109.1.21. ISSN 0002-9114. JSTOR 40025103. S2CID 163785600.
- Stewart, Andrew (2012). "Hellenistic Freestanding Sculpture from the Athenian Agora, Part 1: Aphrodite". Hesperia: The Journal of the American School of Classical Studies at Athens. 81 (2): 267–342. doi:10.2972/hesperia.81.2.0267. ISSN 0018-098X. JSTOR 10.2972/hesperia.81.2.0267. S2CID 190284693.
- Stewart, Andrew (2016). "The Borghese Ares Revisited: New Evidence from the Agora and a Reconstruction of the Augustan Cult Group in the Temple of Ares". Hesperia: The Journal of the American School of Classical Studies at Athens. 85 (3): 577–625. doi:10.2972/hesperia.85.3.0577. ISSN 0018-098X. JSTOR 10.2972/hesperia.85.3.0577. S2CID 193521608.
- Stewart, Andrew; Driscoll, Eric; Estrin, Seth; Gleason, Natalie J.; Lawrence, Erin; Levitan, Rebecca; Lloyd-Knauf, Samantha; Turbeville, Kelsey (2019). "Classical Sculpture from the Athenian Agora, Part 2: The Friezes of the Temple of Ares (Temple of Athena Pallenis)". Hesperia: The Journal of the American School of Classical Studies at Athens. 88 (4): 625–705. doi:10.2972/hesperia.88.4.0625. ISSN 0018-098X. JSTOR 10.2972/hesperia.88.4.0625. S2CID 212984249.
- Stewart, Andrew; Lawrence, Erin; Levitan, Rebecca; Turbeville, Kelsey (2021). "Classical Sculpture from the Athenian Agora, Part 3: The Pediments, Metopes, and Akroteria of the Temple of Ares (Temple of Athena Pallenis)". Hesperia: The Journal of the American School of Classical Studies at Athens. 90 (3): 533–604. doi:10.2972/hesperia.90.3.0533. ISSN 0018-098X. JSTOR 10.2972/hesperia.90.3.0533. S2CID 240546690.
- Stewart, Andrew; Lawrence, Erin; Levitan, Rebecca; Turbeville, Kelsey (2022). "Classical Sculpture from the Athenian Agora, Part 4: Concluding Remarks on the Sculptures of the Temple of Ares (Athena Pallenis)". Hesperia: The Journal of the American School of Classical Studies at Athens. 91 (1): 89–132. doi:10.2972/hesperia.91.1.0089. ISSN 1553-5622. S2CID 252016985.
