= Ares Borghese =

Roman marble statue of the imperial era

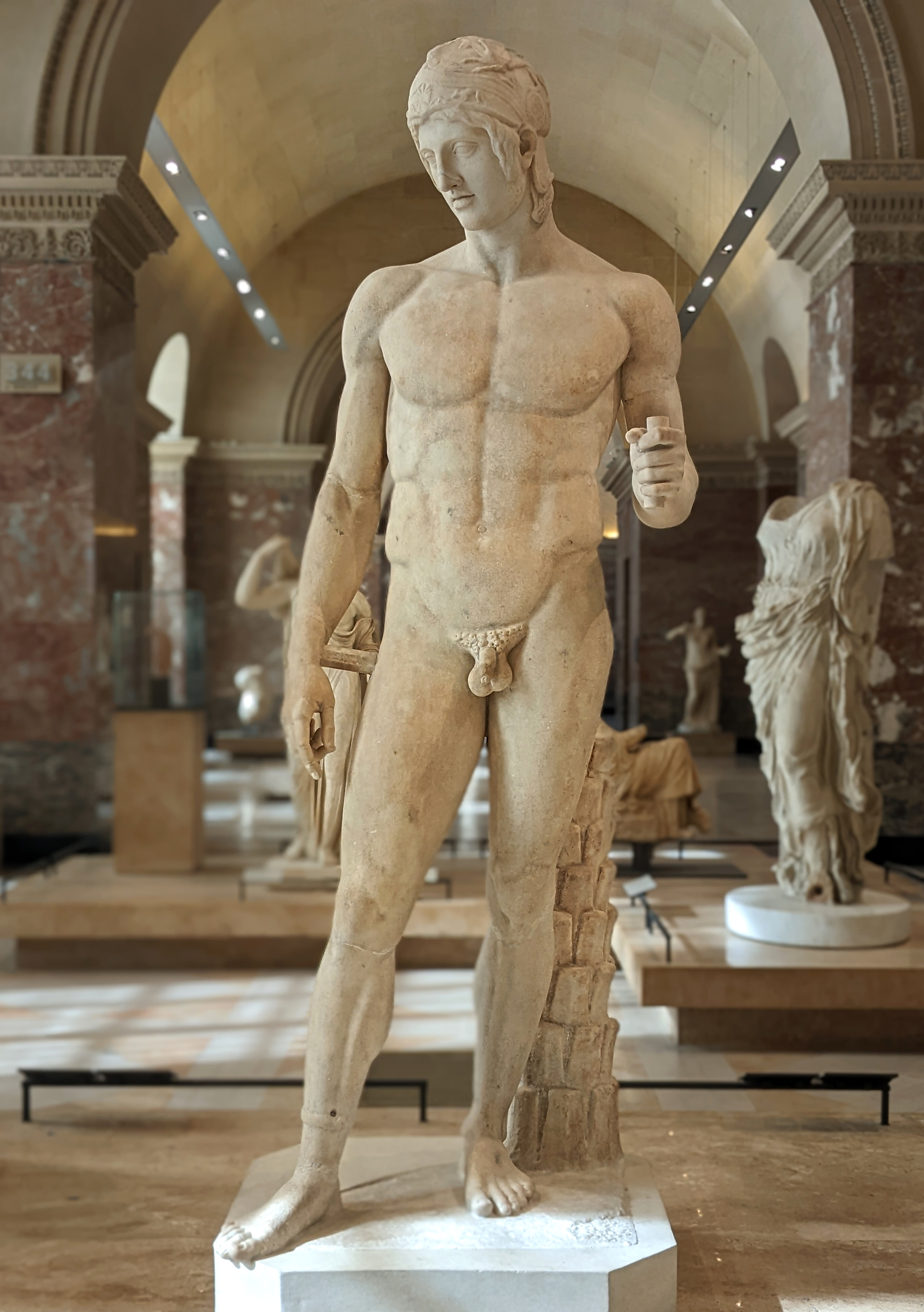
The Ares Borghese in the Louvre (Ma 866)

The Ares Borghese is a Roman marble statue of the imperial era (1st or 2nd century AD). It is 2.11 metres (6 ft 11 in) high. Though the statue is referred to as Ares, this identification is not entirely certain. This statue possibly preserves some features of an original work in bronze, now lost, of the 5th century BC.

The cult and representation of Ares are very rare in the ancient Greek world, especially in sculpture. It has been thought that this statue may be derived from one by Alcamenes, an Athenian sculptor who, according to Pausanias (I, 8, 4), made a statue of Ares that was erected on the Athenian agora. However, the temple of Ares to which he refers had only been moved from Acharnes and re-sited in the Agora in Augustus's time, making this a chronological impossibility. Also, statues known to derive from Alcamenes' statue show the god in a breastplate (one is depicted in this relief). So, in all, this statue may not be a copy of Alcamenes's, but instead a Roman creation according to a classicising or Neo-Attic type.

Later, widely dispersed, this type was paired with female statues of the Venus de Milo type for portraits of the imperial Roman couple, symbol of the union between military and peace, such as the Mars and Venus. Formerly part of the Borghese collection, it was purchased from there in 1807 by Napoleon.

== Identification as Ares ==
While commonly recognized as Ares, this identification has been challenged by some scholars, with an emphasis on the left leg's anklet. Historian Kim Hartswick mentions several possible origins for the so-called anklet: as a setting for a decorative element such as a bronze greave, the top of a boot, or indeed as a ring. But it being an anklet would not necessarily clarify that it is actually Ares. Classicists such as Winckelmann and Furtwängler claimed the ring represented part of a chain, in reference to either the myth of Ares being chained in Sparta or the myth of Ares and Aphrodite being bound in bed together after being discovered by Hephaestus. Other scholars have argued that the ring identifies the statue with Theseus or with Achilles, where in the latter case it is perhaps meant to highlight the hero's vulnerable ankle.

== Popular culture ==
- The statue is present (as a bust) in the anime Sekko Boys.

== Gallery ==
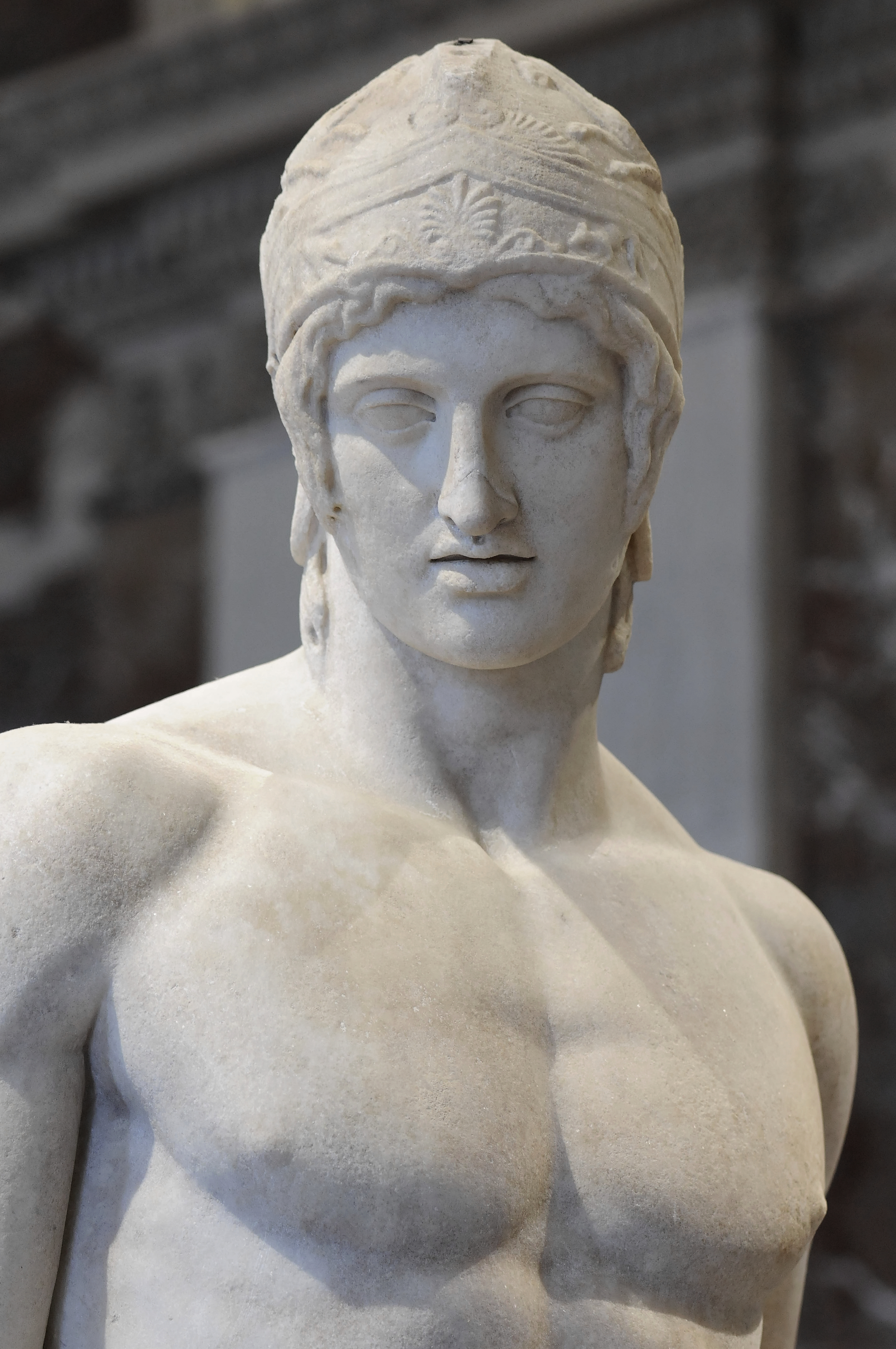
A closer view of the upper torso

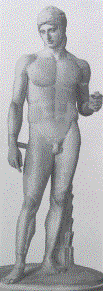
Fuller view

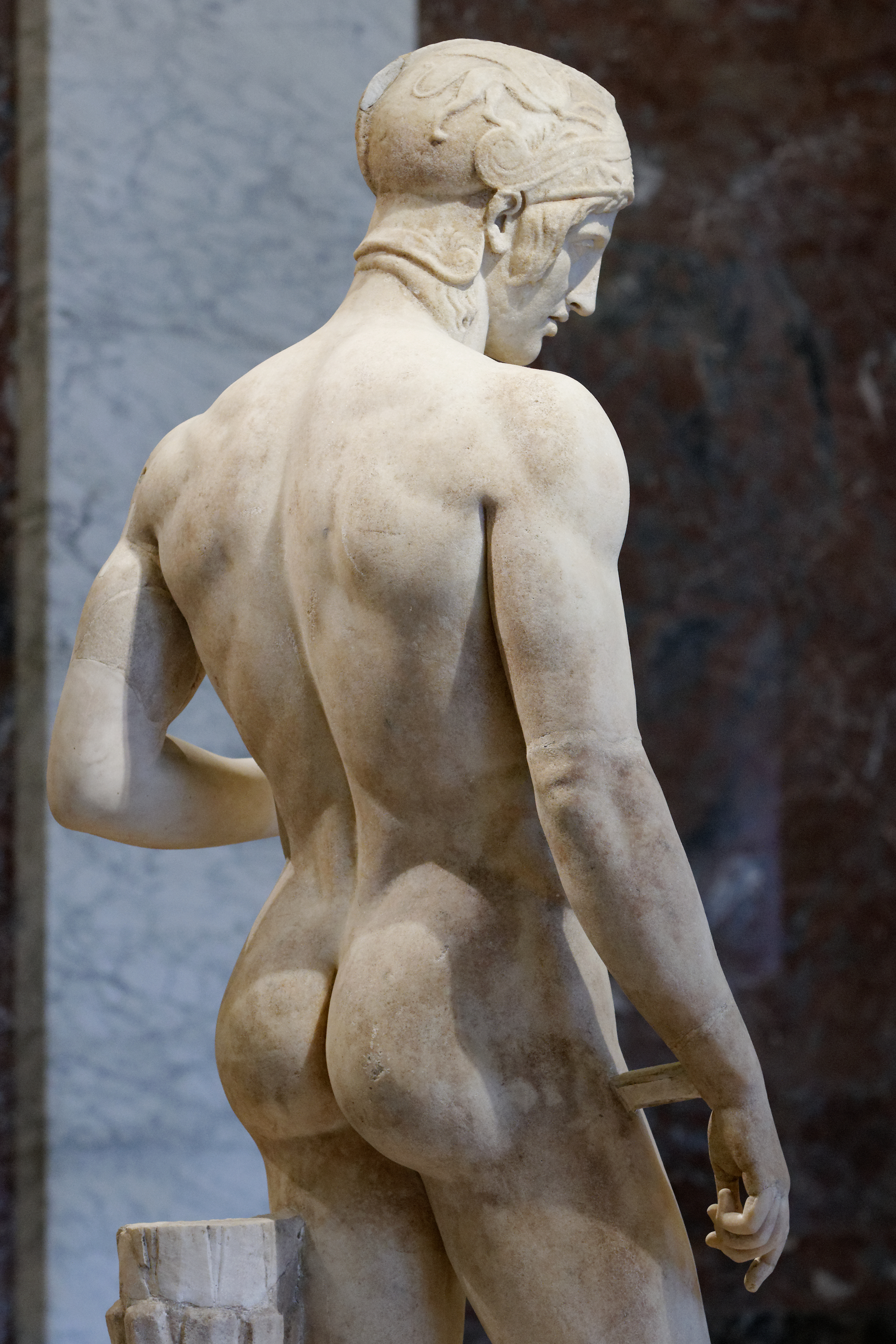
Rear view

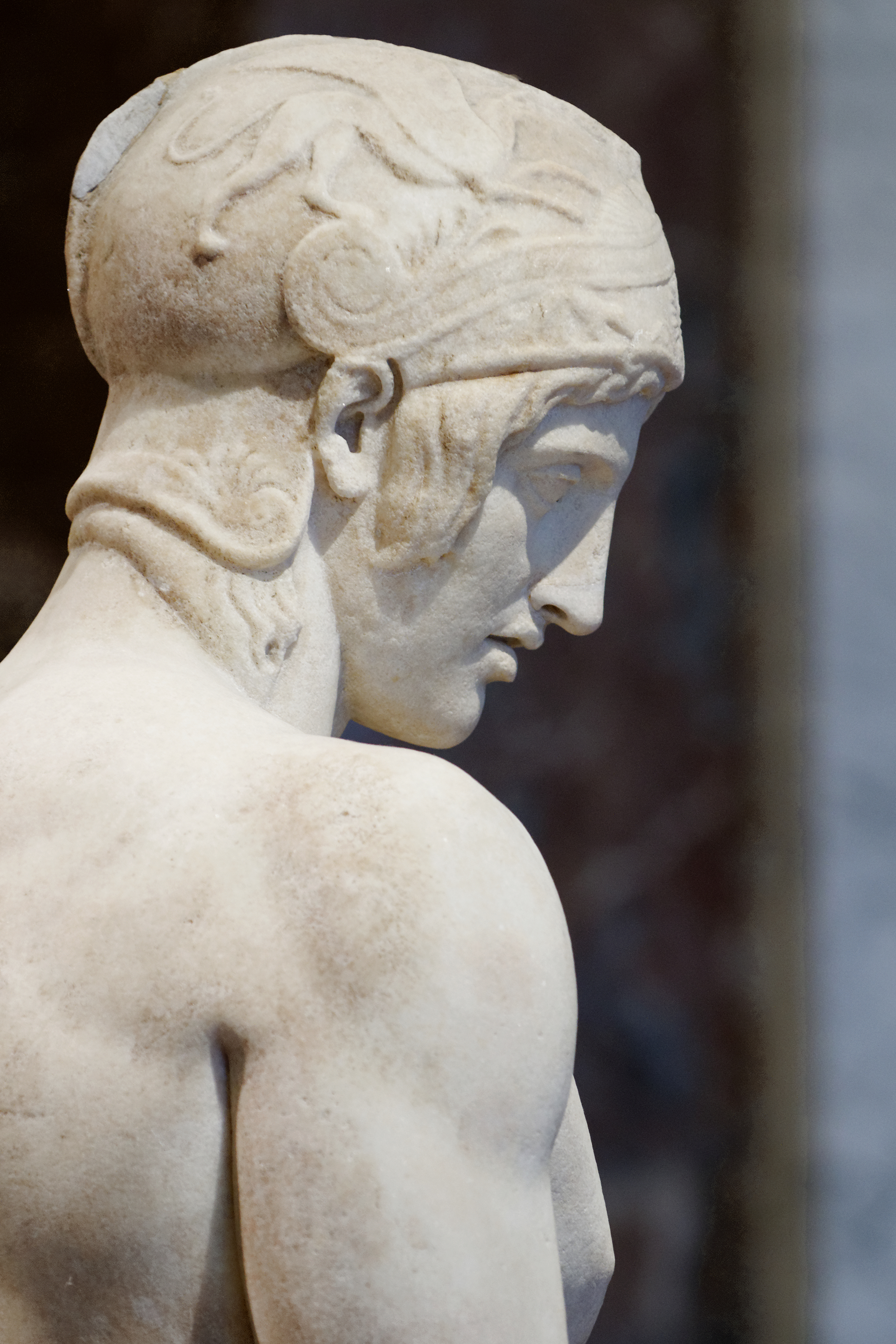
detail of the helmet

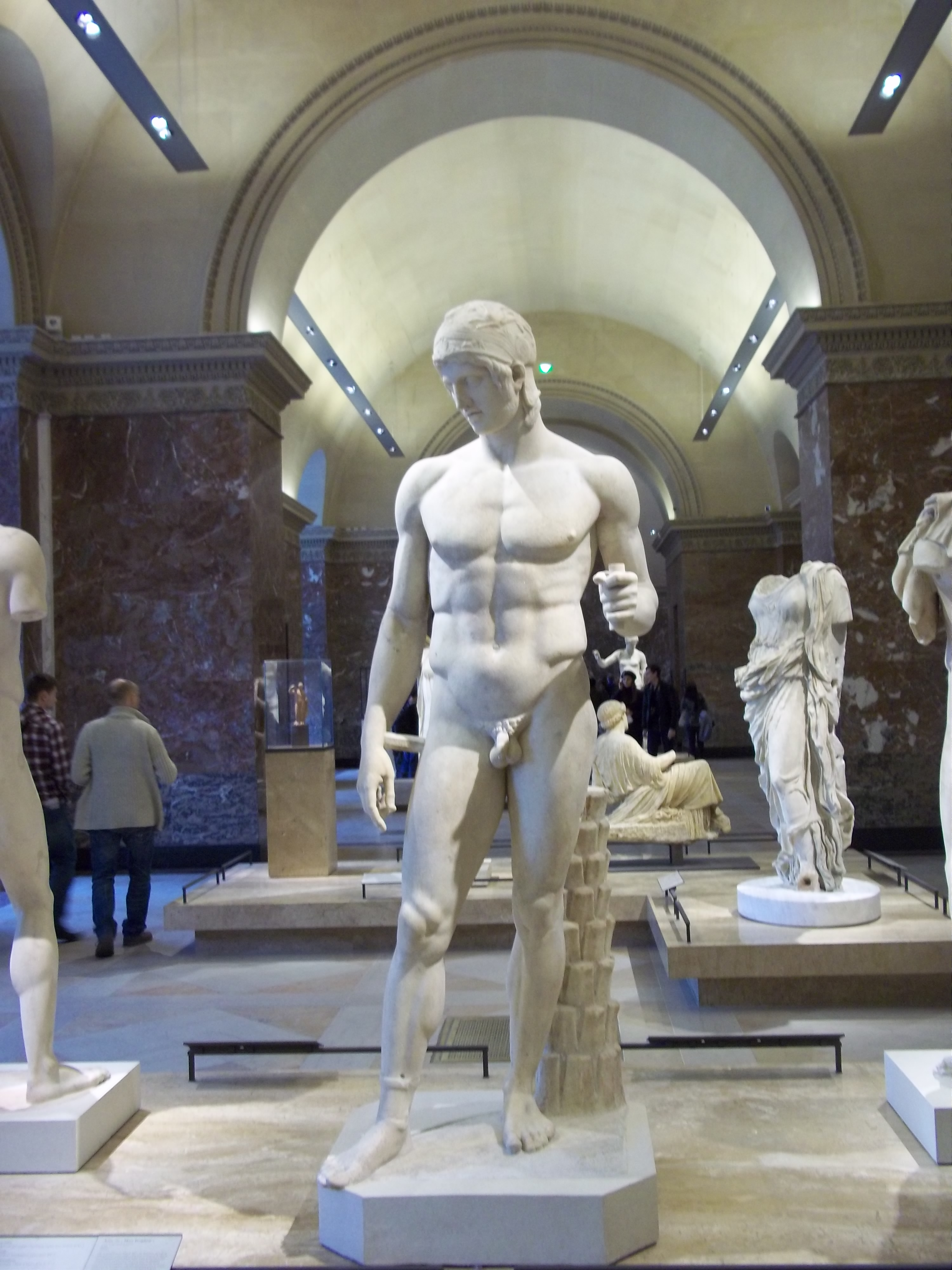
In the Louvre gallery

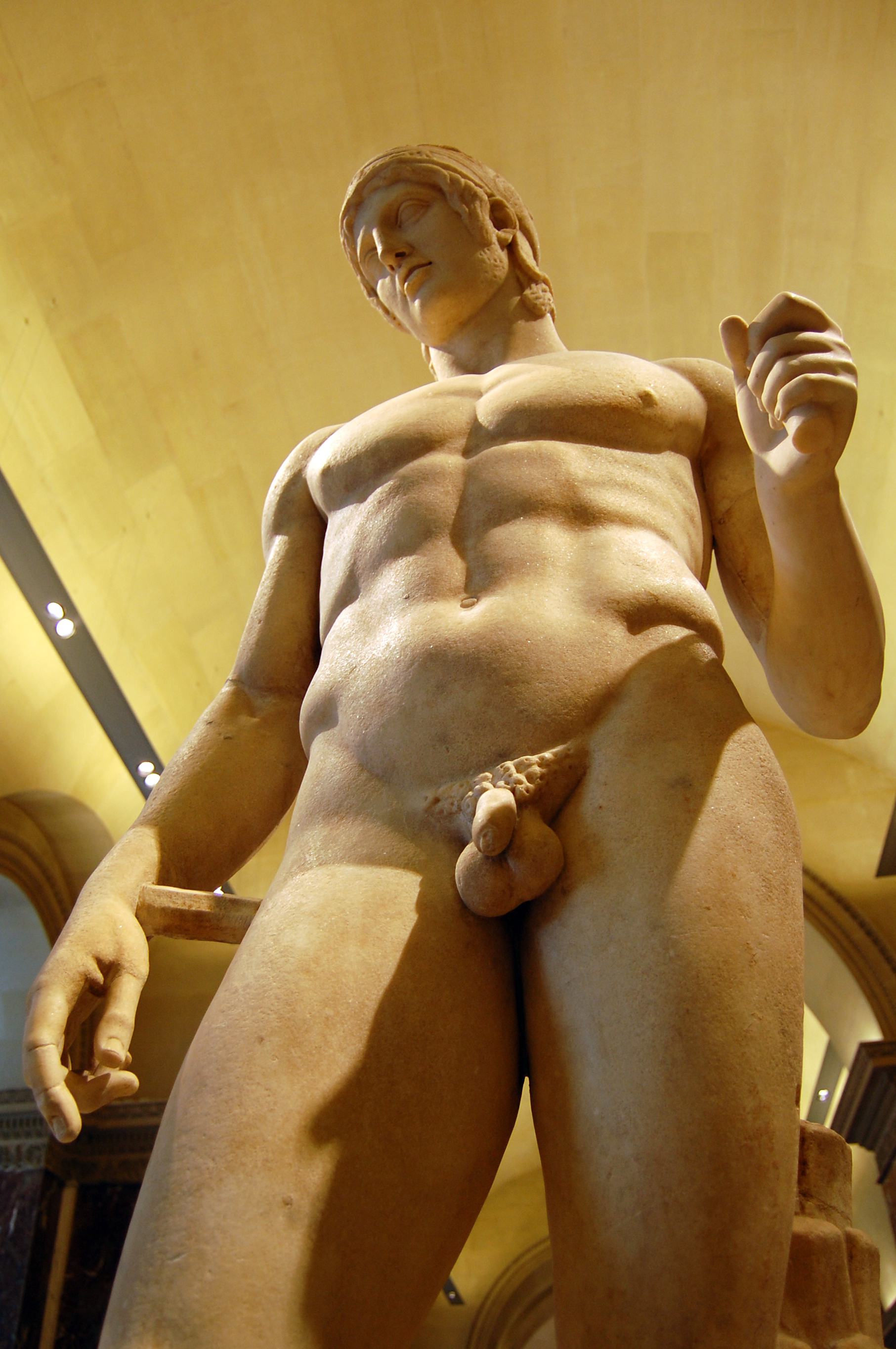
From below
