= Temple of Apollo Patroos =

Ruined temple in the Ancient Agora of Athens

Coordinates: 37.975542°N 23.722099°E

Plan of the Agora ca. 300 BC; the temple of Apollo Patroos is number 5.

The Temple of Apollo Patroos (meaning "of the fathers") is a small ruined temple on the west side of the Ancient Agora of Athens. The original temple was an apsidal structure, built in the mid-sixth century BC and destroyed in 480/79 BC. The area probably remained sacred to Apollo. A new hexastyle ionic temple was built ca. 306-300 BC, which has an unusual L-shaped floor plan. Some fragments from the sculptural decoration of this structure survive. The colossal cult statue, by Euphranor, has also been recovered.

Next to the temple was a tiny shrine, built around the mid-fourth century BC, which has been identified as the Temple of Zeus Phratrios and Athena Phratria; it may originally have been built to house Euphranor's cult statue.

== History and description ==
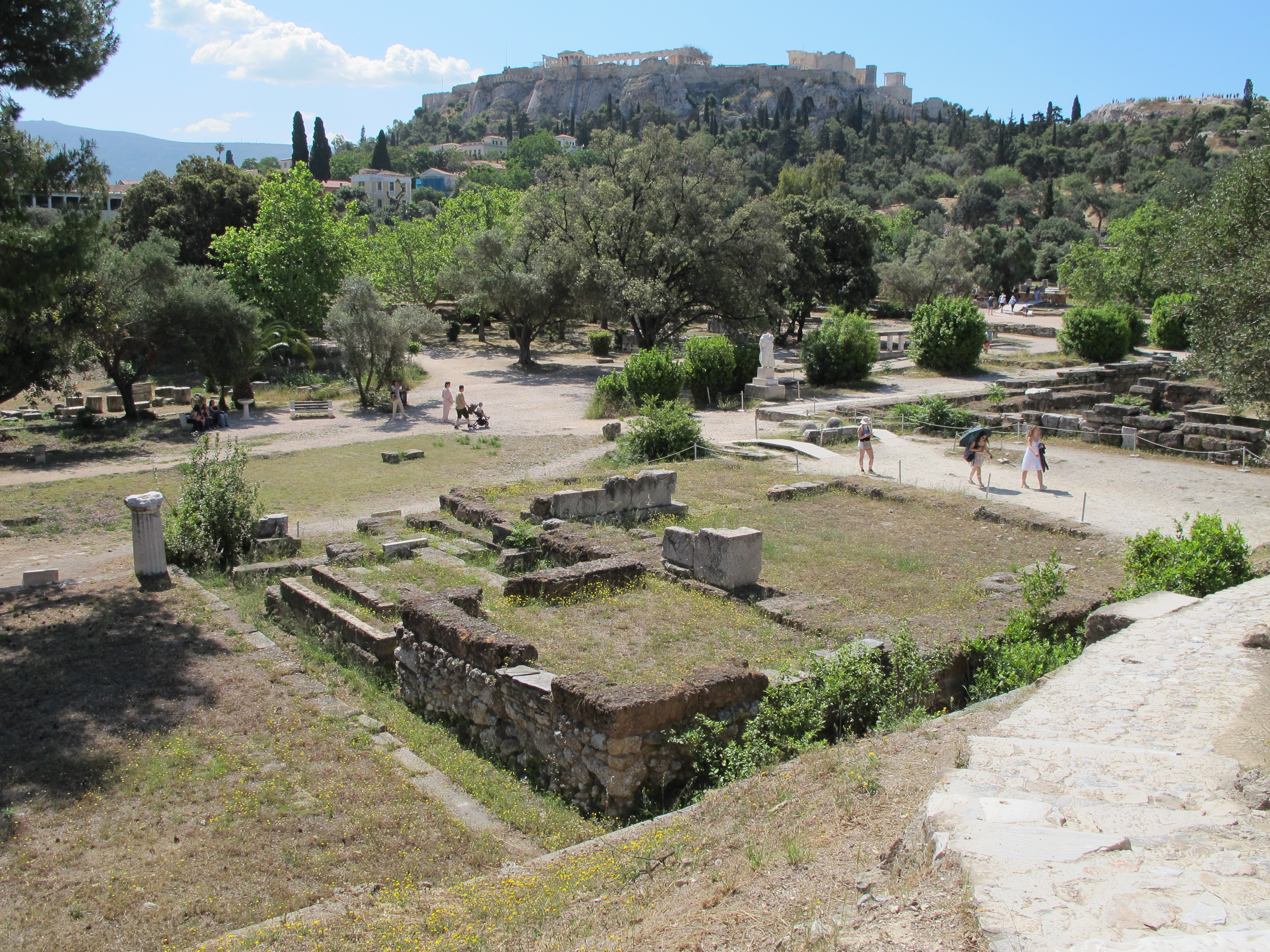
Temple of Apollo Patroos, seen from northwest.

The current temple is the second structure on the site. It is located on the west side of the Agora, beneath the Kolonos Agoraios (Agora hill) and the Temple of Hephaestus. The Stoa of Zeus is located immediately to the north. To the south was an open space and then the Metroon. The space to the east was open, until the Roman period, when the Temple of Ares was built there. The identification of these archaeological remains as the Temple of Apollo Patroos was initially based on the account of Pausanias, who mentions the temple after the Stoa of Zeus and before the Metroon.

=== Archaic temple ===
The first temple on the site is attested by trenches cut into the bedrock, which held foundations made of fieldstones in clay. It faced east and had an apse with a diameter of about 8.50 metres at the west end. On the central axis of this apse was a grey poros block which probably supported a cult statue or perhaps a column. Pottery found in the foundation trenches indicate construction around the middle of the sixth century BC. Chips of Parian marble found in the fill perhaps derive from the construction of this temple. A pit to the south contained fragments of a mould used to cast a bronze statue of a nude male, perhaps the temple's cult statue. The temple had fallen into ruin before the construction of the Stoa of Zeus. It was probably destroyed during the Persian Sack of Athens in 480/79 BC.

Charles Hedrick questions whether this building was actually a temple, but offers no alternative reconstruction.

=== Classical period ===
After this, the area was left empty, as indicated by a set of benches built behind the temple in the mid-fifth century BC, looking east over the Agora.

A boundary stone (horos) from the fifth century is inscribed "boundary stone of Apollo Patroos" (Agora XIX no. 11, inventory number I 5569). This seems to indicate that the area remained sacred to the god. Homer Thompson presumes an open-air sanctuary at this time. In the first half of the fourth century, the area was levelled and a wall was built which runs along the west side of the area for 11.5 metres and then runs east for 17 metres, over the top of the remains of the archaic temple. This bisection of the archaic structure leads Charles Hedrick to doubt that the area was sacred in this period or in the archaic period. In the mid-fourth century a bothros (pit for perishable offerings) was dug in the north part of the area. The tiny temple of Zeus Phratrios and Athena Phratria was built over the top of this bothros in the second half of the fourth century. Lawall and Stewart suggest that it was initially dedicated to Apollo Patroos.

The sanctuary's altar was gilded by Neoptolemus son of Anticles in the 330s or 320s BC. IG II^{2} 4984 inscribed "Of Apollo Patroos" may be part of this altar.

=== Hellenistic temple ===
The current temple faces east and was a hexastyle prostyle temple, meaning that it had six columns along the front. It is believed to have been built in the Ionic order on the basis of four architectural fragments that seem to fit the temple's dimensions. The main structure is 10.13 metres wide and 16.76 metres long. Of that length, 4.88 metres is the pronaos and 9.28 metres is the cella. On the right side of the cella at the back is a doorway leading to further chamber, which is 4.93 metres wide north to south and 5.62 metres long east to west. This room functioned as the adyton, the innermost shrine. The tiny temple of Zeus Phratrios and Athena Phratria is tucked into the space in front of this back room.

The foundations of the temple consisted of a packing of unworked limestone blocks resting on top of the bedrock. The toichobate is made of conglomerate and the euthynteria of hard poros. The walls were limestone. Marble fragments of the supersturcture have been found: steps from the porch, the Ionic base of a pilaster, and a fragment from the geison.

The temple was probably built around 306-300 BC. A Thasian amphora found in its foundations places the construction date after 313 BC and the sculptures of the pediment have been dated stylistically to the last decade of the fourth century BC. (Note: Previously, Shear 1935, p. 353 and Travlos 1971, p. 96 dated the temple to the Lycurgan period (338–326 BC).) Andrew Stewart proposes that the construction of the temple was part of an effort to emphasise Athens ties to the Ionian cities of western Asia Minor, which it considered to be its colonies, after it became part of Antigonus Monophthalmus and Demetrius Poliorcetes' realm, which was based in Asia Minor, in 306 BC. As the father of Ion, Apollo represented Athens' Ionian heritage.

==== Cult statue ====
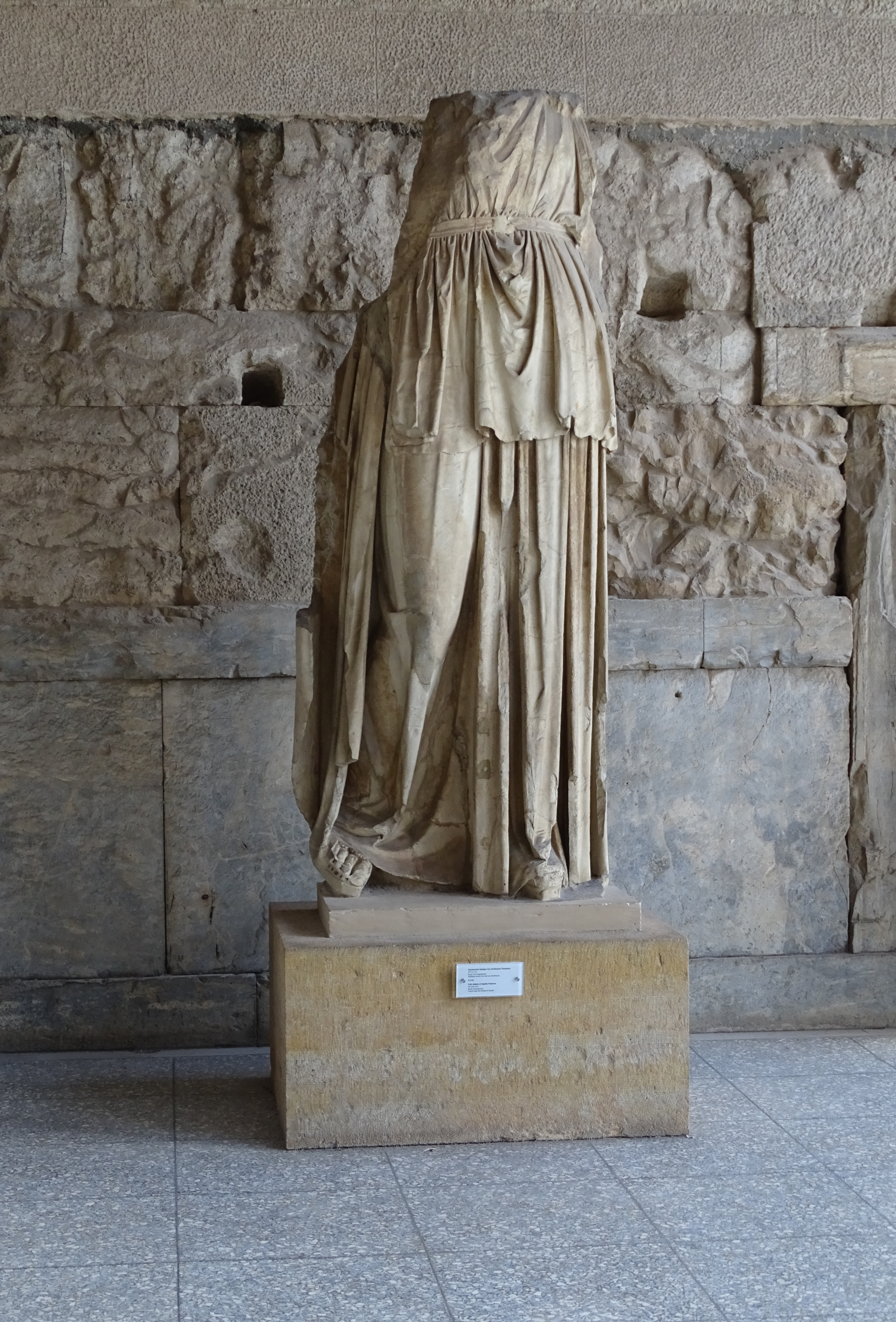
Colossal statue of Apollo (Agora inv. S 2154), possibly the statue of Euphranor

The 2nd-century AD travel writer Pausanias Pausanias reports that the temple contained a cult statue carved by Euphranor. This has been identified with a colossal statue of Apollo (Agora inv. S 2154), which was probably found near the temple, split vertically into two pieces. This statue depicts a male figure in a peplos and himation; the head and both arms are lost, but the statue's long hair is partially preserved on its left shoulder. In its current state, it is 2.54 metres high. The original marble block would have been about 2.8 metres high, 1.2 metres wide and 0.75 metres deep, and weighed around 6.5 tonnes. The head and left forearm (both now lost) were made of separate pieces of marble. There are traces of a socket in the left armpit probably used to support a kithara which the statue held. It can be dated to the mid-fourth century on stylistic grounds. The back is only roughly worked and was not intended to be seen, indicating that it stood against a wall. Imitations of it are known, including a contemporary votive statuette from the Agora and Roman period statues.

Whether this is the statue by Euphranor has been heavily debated. Arguments in support of the identification are the fact that it stood against a wall, is a very high-quality work, was probably found near the temple, is very large, and was frequently copied. Andrew Stewart proposes that it was built to emphasise Athenian ties with the cities of Ionia in the waning years of the Second Athenian League. The statue was probably damaged during the Herulian Sack in 267 AD and was subsequently chopped in half vertically, probably in preparation for loading it into a lime kiln.

Pausanias mentions two further statues of Apollo: one made by Leochares, which was probably bronze, and an Apollo Alexikakos ("averter of evil") made by Calamis. Pausanias claims that the latter was dedicated in thanksgiving for the end of the Plague of Athens in 427 BC, but this is hard to reconcile with other evidence which places his floruit in the mid-fifth century BC. Pausanias says these statues stood "in front of the temple"; it is unclear whether this means that they were located to the east of the structure or stood in the pronaos, where benches along the front of the cross-wall could have accommodated statue bases.

Two marble omphaloi found at the southwest corner of the Metroon and two more found to the north might be votive offerings given to Apollo Patroos.

==== Pedimental sculpture ====
The pediment over the east face of the temple would have been around 9 metres wide and 1.125 metres high at the centre. Two sculptures found in the Agora have been connected with this pediment, which seems to have depicted an epiphany of Apollo. One of them is the lower part of a female figure in a chiton and himation sitting on a rock and looking to her left (inv. S 1530). She was identified by Thompson as a Muse, and Stewart dates her to ca. 310-300 BC. The other is the lower part of a male figure in a long chiton and himation, seated on a throne, possibly with his arms raised (inv. 2110), which Stewart dates to ca. 310-300 BC and identifies as Apollo. They are on the same scale and appear to be by the same sculptors who carved the altar of the Asclepieium on Kos (probably the sons of Praxiteles).

==== Acroteria ====
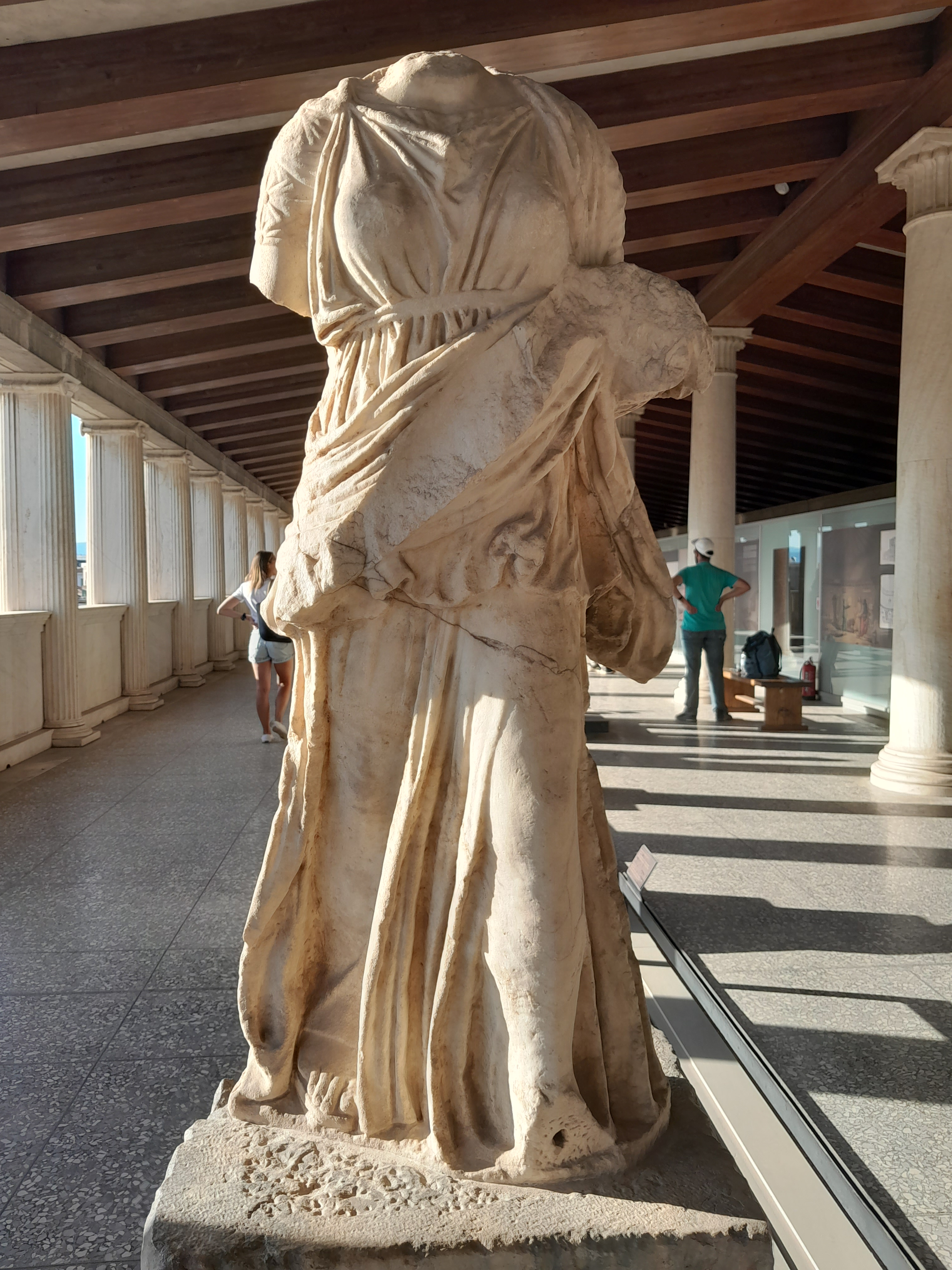
The best-preserved acroterium from the temple depicting a young woman.

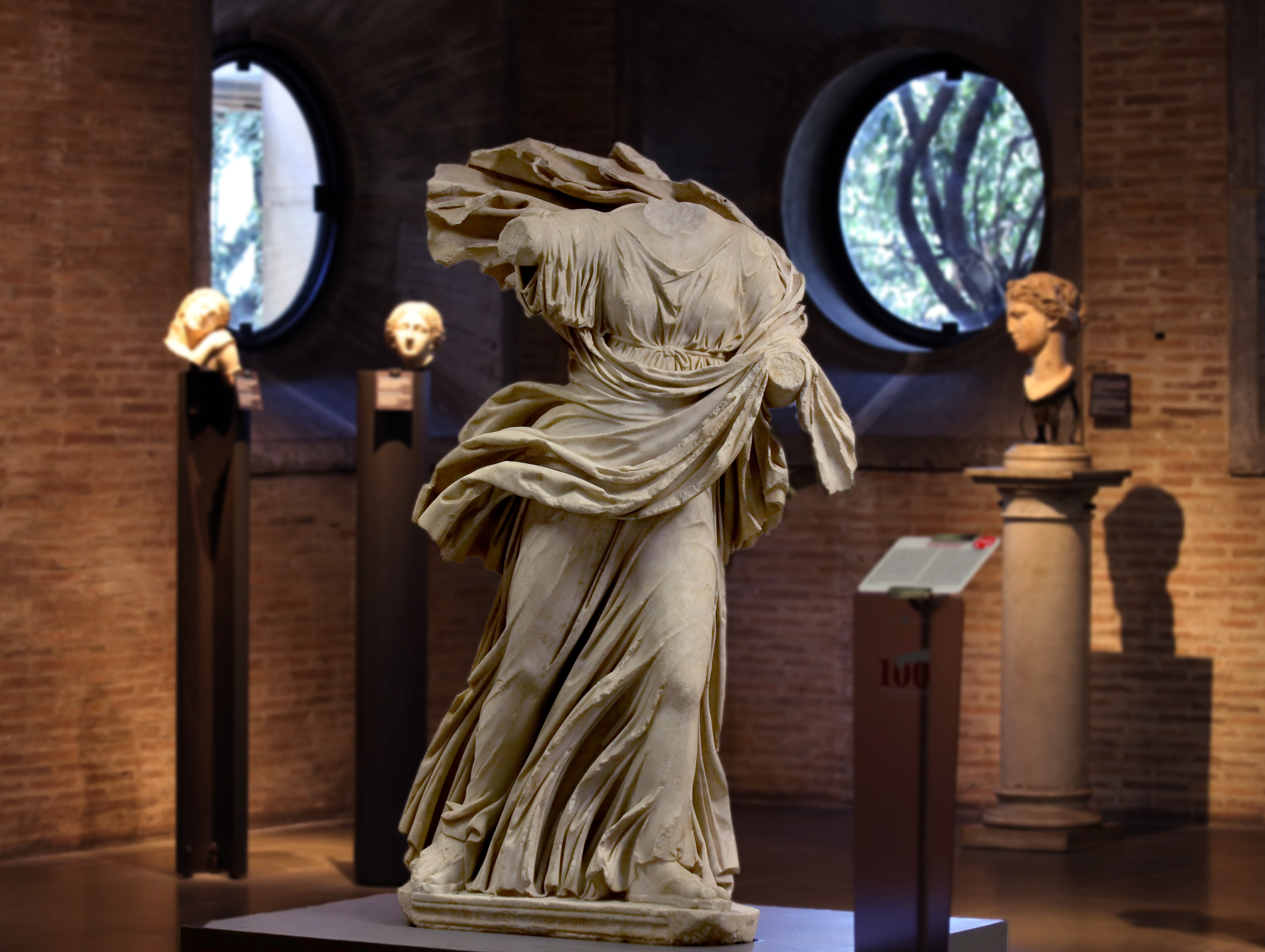
The Chiaramonti Niobid, a Roman copy of the same statue type as the temple's best-preserved acroterium.

Three of the four acroteria have been identified. They depicted the murder of the Niobids by Apollo and Artemis.

The right corner acroterion was a running girl in chiton, an Attic peplos, and himation (inv S 440). She is probably a Niobid, modelled on the Uffizi/Chiaramonti type, which is known from many Roman copies; (Note: Stewart 2017, pp. 298–300, 312 lists the Chiaramonti Niobid (Museo Gregoriano Profano no. 1035), the Running Niobid (found in Rome, now Galleria degli Uffizi no. 72), a statue found at the villa of Marcus Valerius Messalla Corvinus at Ciampino in 2013, and a first century AD fragment found in the Agora (inv. S 1046).) the original was probably part of the Choragic Monument of Thrasyllos, which was built in 320/19 BC.

The other acroteria are preserved only as small fragments. A portion of the drapery from the Argive/Doric peplos of another fleeing Niobid (inv. S 1877) is part of the left corner acroterion. A portion of the chest of a female figure (inv. S 3330), probably Artemis, likely formed part of the central acroterion, since it is slightly larger than the others. She was probably accompanied by a sculpture of Apollo, but no traces of this have been found. Stylistically, all of these sculptures date to the last decade of the fourth century BC.

== Cult ==
There were several sanctuaries of different aspects of Apollo at Athens. Apollo Patroos ("of the fathers") represented Apollo's role as protector of families, tribes, gene, ad phratries, and progenitor of the Athenians, the father of Ion, and ancestor of the Ionians. Literary sources often identify him with Apollo Pythios ("Pythian Apollo"), who was worshipped in Athens at the Pythion. Athenian children who were admitted to a phratry (cult association) were brought into a shrine of Apollo Patroos as part of a ceremony called the Meion - it is probable that this occurred in separate sanctuaries belonging to the phratries in question. Some gene (another kind of cult associations) and phratries, like the Gephyraei, Therrhicleidae, and Elasidae, had their own sanctuaries and priests of Apollo Patroos; others, like the Salaminii, did not sn therefore probably sacrificed to him at this temple. Athenians selected as archon were required to prove that they had their own cult of Apollo Patroos and indicate where it was located before they could assume office. During the reign of Emperor Claudius (AD 41–54), the cult of the emperor was merged with that of Apollo Patroos.

A number of priests of the temple are attested in inscriptions:

- Name lost (ca. 100 BC: Agora XV 260)
- Theodosius son of Dius of Laciadae (ca. 100 BC, IG II^{2} 2871)
- Polycharmus son of Eucles of Marathon (AD 30-37: IG II^{2} 3530), simultaneously priest of Emperor Tiberius
- Dionysodorus son of Sophocles of Sounium (AD 41-54: IG II^{2} 3274)
- Name lost of Gargettus (AD 186: Agora XV 411)
- Aphrodisius son of Eudemus of Phyle (late 2nd century AD: IG II^{2} 3630)
- Publius Aelius Zenon of Berenicidae (ca. 230 AD: IG II^{2} 3697)

The priest of the Apollo Patroos also had a designated seat in the Theatre of Dionysus.

== Temple of Zeus Phratrios and Athena Phratria ==
The temple of Zeus Phratrios and Athena Phratria is a small shrine (naiskos) built in the second half of the fourth century BC, before the Hellenistic temple of Apollo Patroos, which surrounds it on the west and south sides. The Stoa of Zeus is 4 metres to the north. It was a small rectangular structure which faced east and measured 5.2 metres in length and 3.65 metres in width. The remains consist of conglomerate foundations and grey poros blocks from the toichobate. A 1.5 metre wide base at the rear of the cella, could have supported a pair of cult statues. The original floor was made of brown mortar with red-painted pebbles. Later it was replaced with a floor of lime mortar containing Pentelic marble chips. A 4-metre deep and 4.8 metre wide porch was added to the front of the temple between ca. 150 and 86 BC. It was paved with marble and reached by a number of steps.

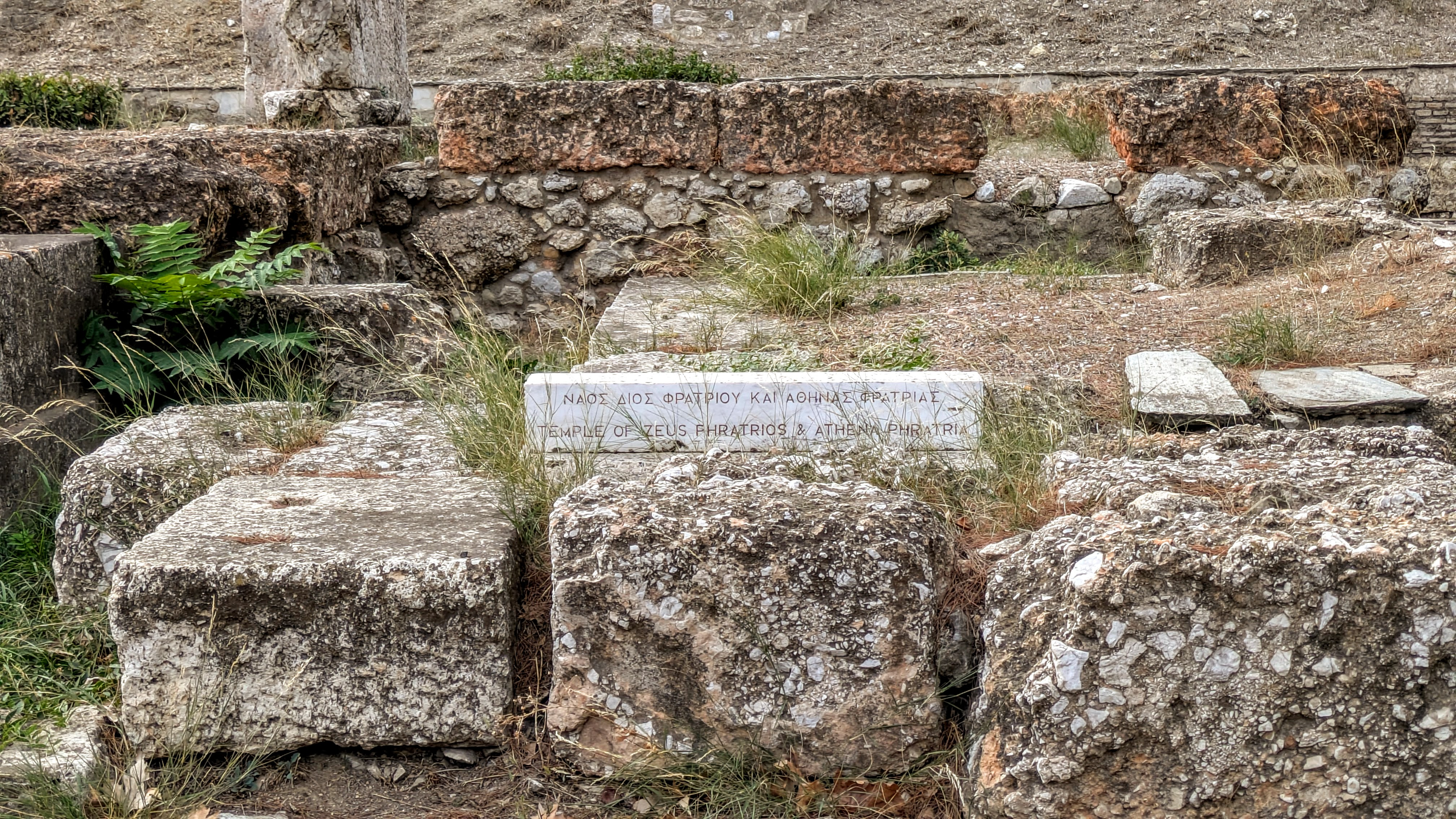
Temple of Zeus Phratrios & Athena Phratria

The identification of the temple is controversial. It is based on a small, square marble altar, inscribed "Of Zeus Phratrios and of Athena Phratrios." This was discovered on the other side of the Agora, but seems to fit a poros base found in front of the temple. Hedrick questions the identification, preferring to place the altar in front of the north end of the Stoa of Attalos, where it was found. He notes that a boundary stone inscribed "sacred to Zeus Phratrios and Athena" was also found in this area. Lippolis and Greco propose that the temple was instead dedicated to Zeus Eleutherios, Lawall that it was for Apollo Patroos. Andrew Stewart expands on this, suggesting that it was originally built for the colossal statue of Apollo, demolished in order to move the statue to the new temple of Apollo Patroos, and then rebuilt and rededicated to Zeus Phratrios and Athena Phratria.

== Excavation history ==
The temple was first excavated by Wilhelm Dörpfeld for the German Archaeological Institute in 1895 and 1896, who identified it as the Stoa Basileios. The Greek Archaeological Society conducted further excavations in 1907 and 1908, during which the colossal statue of Apollo was found. Fuller investigation was undertaken as part of the excavations of the Agora by the American School of Classical Studies at Athens from 1931 to 1935. It was first identified as the temple of Apollo Patroos in 1935.

== Bibliography ==
- Shear, T. Leslie (1935). "The Campaign of 1934". Hesperia: The Journal of the American School of Classical Studies at Athens. 4 (3): 352–354. doi:10.2307/146457. ISSN 0018-098X. JSTOR 146457.
- Thompson, Homer A. (1937). "Buildings on the West Side of the Agora". Hesperia: The Journal of the American School of Classical Studies at Athens. 6 (1): 77–115. doi:10.2307/146486. ISSN 0018-098X. JSTOR 146486.
- Thompson, Homer A. (1952). "Excavations in the Athenian Agora: 1951". Hesperia: The Journal of the American School of Classical Studies at Athens. 21 (2): 109–110. doi:10.2307/146780. ISSN 0018-098X. JSTOR 146780.
- Wycherley, R. E. (1957). The Athenian Agora III: Literary and Epigraphical Testimonia. Princeton, NJ: American School of Classical Studies at Athens.
- Adam, Sheila (1966). Technique of Greek Sculpture in the Archaic and Classical Periods. London: Thames and Hudson. pp. 94–97.
- Travlos, John (1971). Pictorial Dictionary of Ancient Athens: John Travlos. Praeger. pp. 96–99. ISBN 978-0-500-05012-5.
- Palagia, Olga (1980). Euphranor. Leiden: Brill.
- Hedrick, Charles W. (1988). "The Temple and Cult of Apollo Patroos in Athens". American Journal of Archaeology. 92 (2): 185–210. doi:10.2307/505629. ISSN 0002-9114. JSTOR 505629.
- Camp, John McK; Mauzy, Craig A. (2003). The Athenian Agora: A Short Guide. ASCSA. ISBN 978-0-87661-643-7.
- Cromey, R.D. (2006). "Apollo Patroos and the Phratries". L'Antiquité Classique. 75: 41–69. ISSN 0770-2817. JSTOR 41665278.
- Lawall, Mark L. (2009). "The Temple of Apollo Patroos Dated by an Amphora Stamp". Hesperia: The Journal of the American School of Classical Studies at Athens. 78 (3): 387–403. ISSN 0018-098X. JSTOR 25622701.
- Stewart, Andrew (2017). "Hellenistic Sculpture from the Athenian Agora, Part 4: The East Pediment and Akroteria of the Temple of Apollo Patroos". Hesperia: The Journal of the American School of Classical Studies at Athens. 86 (2): 273–323. doi:10.2972/hesperia.86.2.0273. ISSN 0018-098X. JSTOR 10.2972/hesperia.86.2.0273.
