= Hellenistic Arsenal, Athens =

Structure in Athens, Greece

Plan of the Ancient Agora of Athens in the Roman Imperial period. The Hellenistic Arsenal is number 26.

The Hellenistic Arsenal, located on the Kolonos Agoraios in Athens to the west of the Agora and north of the Temple of Hephaestus, is It was one of the largest structures in Athens during the Hellenistic period.

== Description ==
The arsenal was a long, rectangular building, with a northwest–southeast orientation, located north of the Temple of Hephaestus on the Kolonos Agoraios (the hill to the west of the Athenian Agora). The entrance was at the northwestern end. The building was aligned with and accessed from a paved road that ran from the Pnyx to the north slope of the Kolonos Agoraios, where it was linked to the Sacred Way by a staircase. The arsenal was not accessible from the Agora.

The arsenal was 44.40 metres long and 17.62 metres wide. Its walls were 0.98 metres thick. Inside, the structure was divided into three aisles by two rows of eight columns with bases measuring 1.70 x 1.70 metres. each column is 4.82 metres from the next one. The central aisle is 5.10 metres wide; the side aisles are 4.60 metres wide. These columns were aligned with eight piers or engaged columns on the inside of each of the long walls. A wall 0.5 metres south of the arsenal runs parallel with its south wall and separates it from the precinct of the Temple of Hephaestus, probably to prevent water flowing down from the precinct into the arsenal. This wall impinges on the northeast corner of the Classical wall of the precinct of the Temple of Hephaestus about 15 metres from the eastern end of the arsenal.

The trenches cut into the bedrock for the foundations of the long walls are preserved for large stretches. Blocks from the foundation remain in situ at the northern and southern corners. The rest of the masonry, including the whole superstructure, has been spoliated. The surviving foundation blocks are made of high-quality, reddish, hard conglomerate. The walls probably consisted of a row of poros orthostates and then mudbricks above that. If there were windows, they were small and high up. The columns and pilasters supported timber joists of a gable roof.

There were two cisterns linked to the arsenal. The "Egyptian cistern", named for the Egyptian faience found inside it, was located at the southwest corner of the arsenal. The other cistern, called the "cistern of Group C" was in the middle of its northern side. Both of these cisterns consisted of two chambers - one located inside the building and the other outside - linked together by winding passageway. Rainwater would have flowed into them as it washed off the arsenal's roof.

== History ==
=== Construction ===
The date of construction is indicated by a third cistern, called "the Cave", which had served a house in the area, but was closed when the arsenal was built. Pottery and coinage found in the cistern suggest that this closure occurred in the 260s. Pottery deposits in the foundations tend to a similar period. Pounder therefore places construction in the 270s-260s BC, a period of tension between Athens and Antigonid Macedonia, which culminated in the Chremonidean War.

=== Function ===
The building has been identified as an arsenal because it resembles the mid-fourth century Naval Arsenal in the Piraeus. Close similarities in measurements suggest that the Hellenistic Arsenal was directly modelled on the Naval Arsenal. The location next to the Temple of Hephaestus, the armourer of the gods, might also have been appropriate for an arsenal. The location was also appropriate because there were metalworking operations in the vicinity. The Hipparcheion, the headquarters for Athens' cavalry also seems to have been located in the general area. The location would also have been convenient for supplying Athenian troops, when they marshalled in the Agora. The water from the cisterns may have been used to clean the weapons and armour stored in the arsenal. Before the construction of the Hellenistic Arsenal, some weapons and armour were kept on the Acropolis in the Chalkotheke, but the majority must have been stored somewhere in the lower city. It is unclear where.

Pounder suggests that the arsenal served as a headquarters for the treasurer of the military fund (Ancient Greek: ταμίας τῶν στρατιωτικῶν, romanized: tamias ton stratiotikon), because this officer suddenly reappears in the epigraphic record in an inventory list of the Asclepieion from 273/2 BC (IG II^{2} 674), and proposes that the structure was built around the year of this reappearance.

G. Roger Edwards suggests that the arsenal was also used to store olive oil for victors in athletic games, because many fragments from the Panathenaic amphorae, which were awarded to victors in the Panathenaic Games, have been found in the area. This fits with Pounder's theory, since the treasurer of the military fund was responsible for distributing the oil to the organisers of the Panathenaic Games in the Hellenistic period.

=== Destruction ===
The date when the arsenal went out of use is indicated by the deposits in the two cisterns linked with the structure. The Group C cistern went out of use after 200 BC, probably around 175-150 BC. while the Egyptian cistern contains a main deposit dating between ca. 150 and 110 BC, and a supplemental deposit early in the first century BC, which includes sculptural fragments broken off from the Temple of Hephaestus. The main deposit seems to indicate that the cistern had gone out of use; it is unclear why. The final deposit most likely means that the building was destroyed during the Sullan Sack of Athens in 86 BC. Destruction fill over the southern foundations consists of mortar from the walls, tiles from the roof, and late Hellenistic pottery. There is no evidence for burning; Pounder suggests that the building was disassembled so that the roof timbers could be used for siege equipment as Sulla attacked Athenian defenders still holed up on the Acropolis.

The area was heavily occupied after the arsenal's destruction. Over the following centuries, the structure was slowly spoliated for other buildings, such as the Temple of Ares in the Agora. Remains of later houses, wells, and cisterns from the Roman, Byzantine, and Ottoman periods overlie the remains of the arsenal.

== Excavation ==
The Hellenistic arsenal was excavated by the American School of Classical Studies at Athens, as part of their Agora excavations in 1936 and 1937. The work was supervised by Dorothy Burr Thompson in the first year and Homer A. Thompson in the second.

== Bibliography ==
- Edwards, G. Roger (1957). "Panathenaics of Hellenistic and Roman Times". Hesperia: The Journal of the American School of Classical Studies at Athens. 26 (4): 320–349. doi:10.2307/147219. ISSN 0018-098X. JSTOR 147219.
- Pounder, Robert L. (1983). "A Hellenistic Arsenal in Athens". Hesperia: The Journal of the American School of Classical Studies at Athens. 52 (3): 233–256. doi:10.2307/148003. ISSN 0018-098X. JSTOR 148003.
- Rotroff, Susan I. (1983). "Three Cistern Systems on the Kolonos Agoraios". Hesperia: The Journal of the American School of Classical Studies at Athens. 52 (3): 257–297. doi:10.2307/148004. ISSN 0018-098X. JSTOR 148004.
- Korres, Manolis (1992–1998). "Από τον Σταυρο στην Αγορά". ΗΟΡΟΣ. 10–12: 83–104.
- Stewart, Andrew (2016). "The Borghese Ares Revisited: New Evidence from the Agora and a Reconstruction of the Augustan Cult Group in the Temple of Ares". Hesperia: The Journal of the American School of Classical Studies at Athens. 85 (3): 577–625. doi:10.2972/hesperia.85.3.0577. ISSN 0018-098X. JSTOR 10.2972/hesperia.85.3.0577.
