= Gargettus =

Coordinates: 38°01′00″N 23°52′19″E

Gargettus or Gargettos (Ancient Greek: Γαργηττός) was a deme of ancient Attica. From the mythical story of the war of the Pallantidae against Theseus, we learn that the demoi of Pallene, Gargettus, and Agnus were adjacent. When Pallas was marching from Sphettus in the Mesogaea against Athens, he placed a body of his troops in ambush at Gargettus, under the command of his two sons, who were ordered, as soon as he was engaged with the army of Theseus, to march rapidly upon Athens and take the city by surprise, but the stratagem was revealed to Theseus by Leos of Agnus, the herald of Pallas; whereupon Theseus cut to pieces the troops at Gargettus. In consequence of this a lasting enmity followed between the inhabitants of Pallene and Agnus.

The road from Sphettus to Athens passed through the opening between Mount Pentelicus and Mount Hymettus. A monastery there by the name of Ieraka (or Hieraka) is the site of Gargettus. The proximity of Pallene and Gargettus is indicated by another legend. Pallene was celebrated for its temple of Athena Pallenis, in front of which was the tomb of Eurystheus.

Between the monastery of Ieraka and the small village of Charvati (part of modern Pallini), a celebrated inscription respecting money due to temples was discovered, and which was probably placed in the temple of Athena Pallenis. In Ieraka there was also found the boustrophedon inscription of Aristocles, which probably also came from the same temple.

The Hellenistic philosopher Epicurus resided in Gargettus in the 3rd century BCE.

== Historical monuments ==
- The church of St. George the «Chostos» hermitage of St. Timothy. A wall painting monument (1727) of George Markou the Argus, the great and prolific post-Byzantine ecclesiastic iconographer of the 18th century. ("....Nel 1727, Marcou si trova di nuovo ad Atene, dove assume l’agiografia dei Templi di San Giorgio di Chostu (eremitaggio)...." Evangelos Andreou http://ketlib.lib.unipi.gr/xmlui/handle/ket/849
