= Pallantides =

Mythological princes of Athens

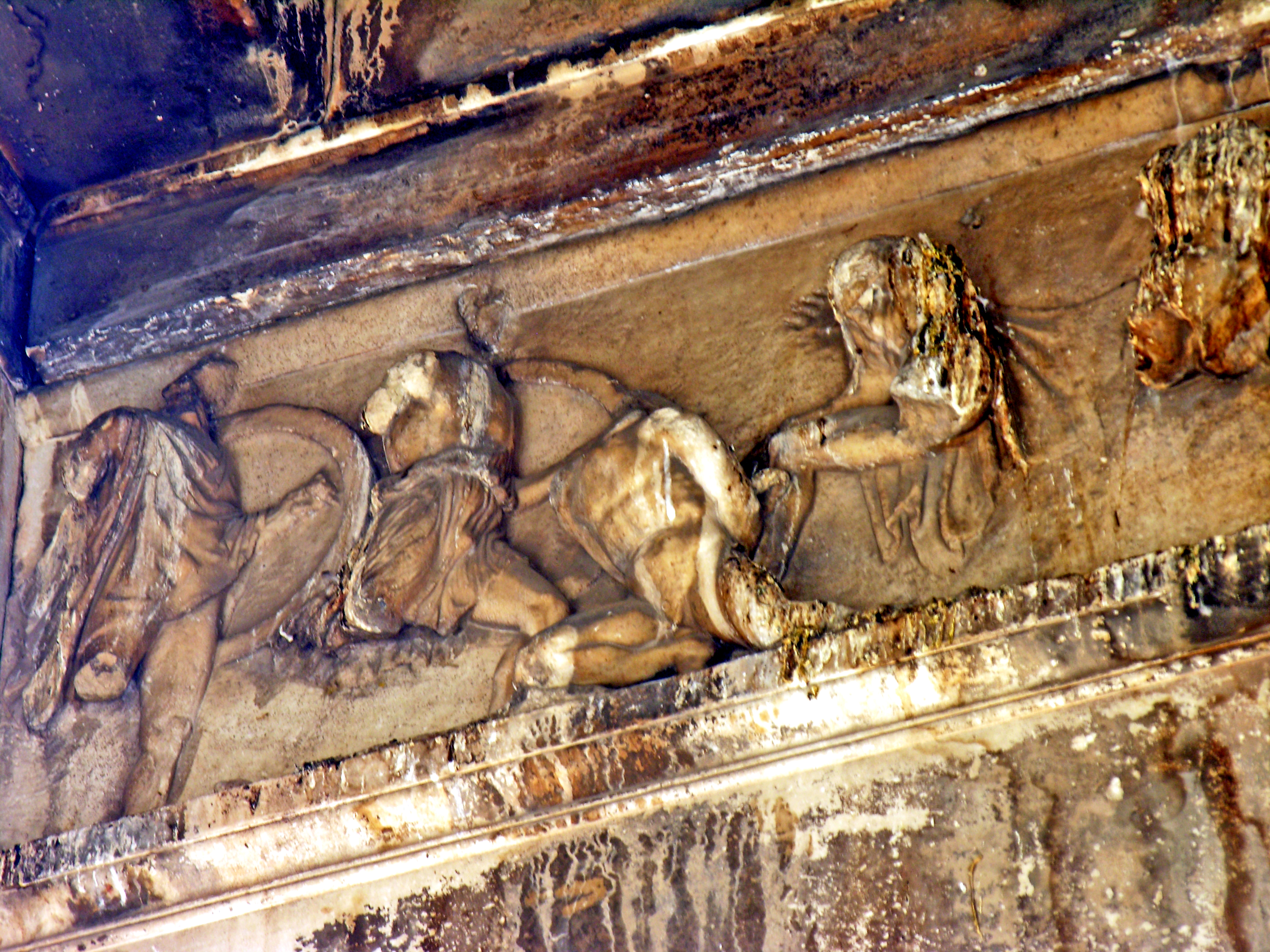
The fight against the Pallantidae on the frieze of the Temple of Hephaestus at Athens, Greece.

In Greek mythology, the Pallantidae (Ancient Greek: Παλλαντίδαι, romanized: Pallantídai, lit. 'sons of Pallas') were the fifty sons of Pallas, younger brother of Aegeus, king of Athens.

== Mythology ==
Diodorus Siculus related that the Pallantidae once became friends with Androgeos, a son of Minos, and that was why Aegeus had Androgeos assassinated, fearing that Pallas and his sons could use this friendship to get assistance from the powerful Minos against him. The Pallantidae and their father marched against Theseus and Aegeus in order to seize the throne; according to Plutarch, one half of them under command of Pallas openly marched on Athens from Sphettus, while the other half laid in ambush near Gargettus. However, their herald Leos warned Theseus of their schemes and Theseus pre-emptively ambushed the Pallantidae and killed all those at Gargettus, whereupon the other half retreated. Other sources state that Theseus killed all the fifty Pallantidae as well as Pallas. A tradition saying that he spared their sister, Aricia, whom he kept as slave, is followed in Jean Racine's Phèdre but is not supported by extant genuinely ancient sources.

Ovid mentioned two of the Pallantidae, Butes and Clytus, as companions of Cephalus. but other than this, no individual names of any of the Pallantidae survived.

Some scholars believe that the east frieze of the Hephaisteion depicts the battle of Theseus against the Pallantidae.
