= Venus and Mars (sculpture) =

Roman marble statue

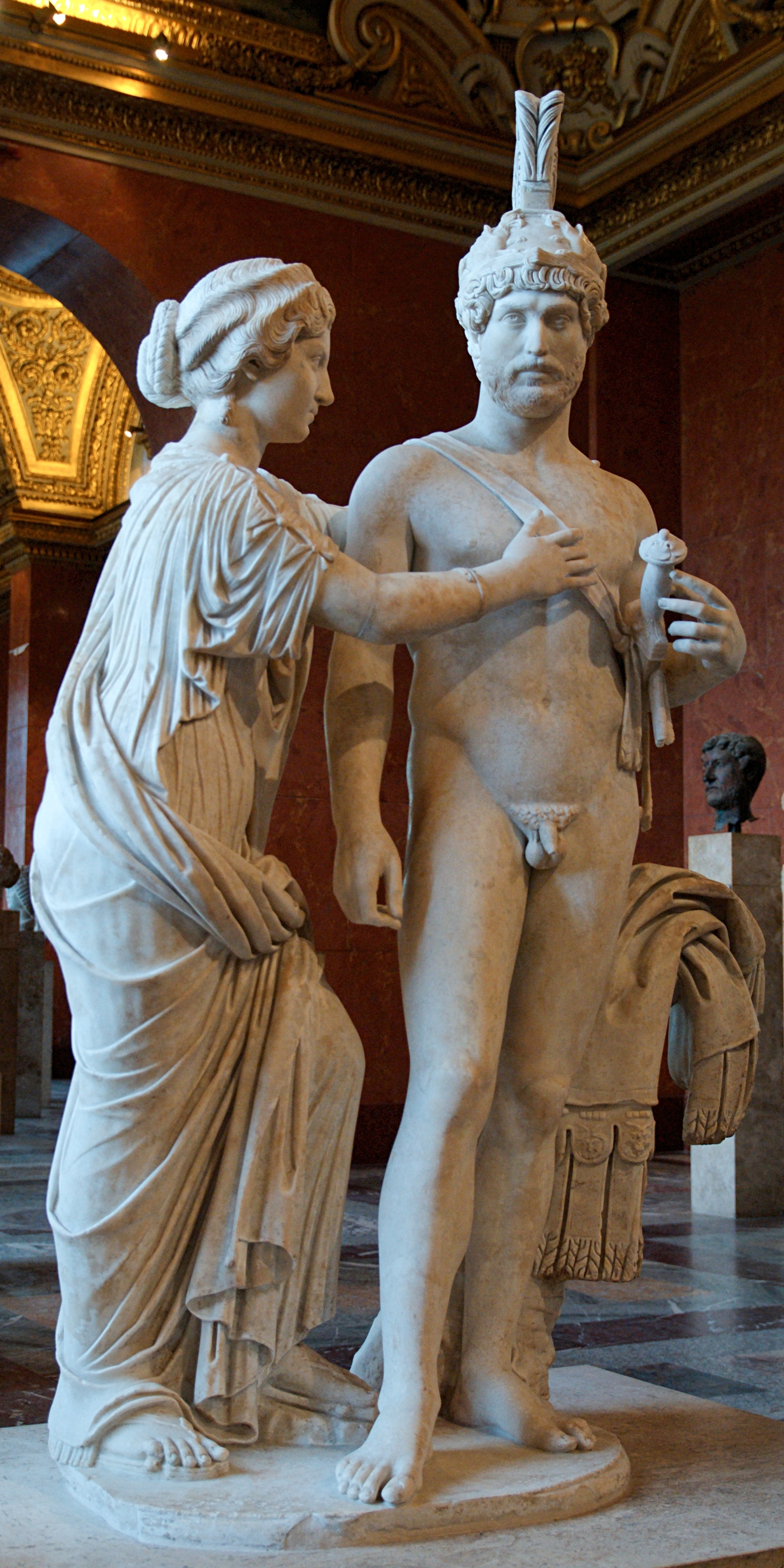
Hadrian and Sabina as Mars and Venus

Hadrian and Sabina as Mars and Venus is a 1.73-metre (5 ft 8 in) tall marble statue of 120–140 AD (with restorations of c. 170–175).

The male figure originally represented the emperor Hadrian, but its head has later been restored to that of Lucius Verus. Shown in the guise of Mars, this makes Hadrian one of the first emperors to be portrayed as a god during his lifetime rather than be posthumously apotheosized. The female figure, in the pose of the Capuan Venus, arms him. The present female head, changed in antiquity, does not belong to the body and portrays Lucilla (Lucius Verus's wife) - the original head was probably that of Vibia Sabina, Hadrian's wife.

The group reflects the hellenizing taste of the Hadrianic era and the revival of the neo-classical or Neo-Attic style.
