= Euthynteria =

Ancient Greek term

Euthynteria is the ancient Greek term for the uppermost course of a building's foundations, partly emerging from groundline. The superstructure of the building (stylobate, columns, walls, and entablature) were set on the euthynteria. Archaeologists and architects use the term in discussion of Classical architecture.

== See also ==
- Crepidoma
- Ancient Greek temple
