= East Building (Athenian Agora) =

Structure in the Agora of Athens

Anachronistic plan of the Ancient Agora of Athens in the Roman Imperial period. The East Building is no. 30.

The East Building was a rectangular structure at the south end of the Agora in ancient Athens. It was built in the mid-second century BC as the east side and main entrance to an enclosed complex called the South Square, which may have served as a commercial area or as lawcourts. The structure was damaged in the Sullan Sack of 86 BC and used for industrial purposes until the early second century AD when it was rebuilt. It was demolished after the Herulian Sack of 267 AD and used as building material for the Post-Herulian Wall.

== Location and date ==
The East Building was a rectangular building located at the south end of the Agora. Today the remains are located immediately north of the Church of the Holy Apostles. In the late Hellenistic period it formed the east side and main entrance of a long rectangular courtyard, known as the South Square, which was built in stages in the mid-second century BC. The north and south edges of this complex were formed by the Middle Stoa and South Stoa II, which were connected to the north and south ends of the East building. The west side was closed off by the pre-existing Aiakeion and Southwest Fountain House, which also set the orientation for the rest of the complex. There appear to have been two late second century temples in the centre of the courtyard; a peripteral temple at the west end and a porch temple to the east, but these are very poorly known. To the east of the East Building was the Panathenaic Way, the main thoroughfare leading from the Agora up to the Athenian Acropolis. Around 110 AD, the Library of Pantaenus and the Southeast Stoa were built on the opposite side of the road. South of the East Building was the Southeast Fountain House and, later, the Southeast Temple and Nymphaeum.

The northern end of the East Building was separated from the Middle Stoa by a narrow gutter. The Middle Stoa was built around 183 BC. The similarity of construction of the two buildings shows that the East Building was built around the same time, but the two structures are not perfectly aligned, showing that they were not built at exactly the same moment, and the relationship between them indicates that the East Building was later. The south wall of the East Building is aligned with the south wall of South Stoa II; the southern end of the western wall of the East Building served as the stoa's eastern wall. The way that these walls interface shows that the South Stoa was later than the East Building. The structures of the South Square incorporated building material from the Square Peristyle, a structure in the northeast corner of the Agora which was demolished in the early second century BC. None of this material was used in the Middle Stoa, some was used in the East Building, and a lot was used in South Stoa II. This may have chronological implications.

== Description ==
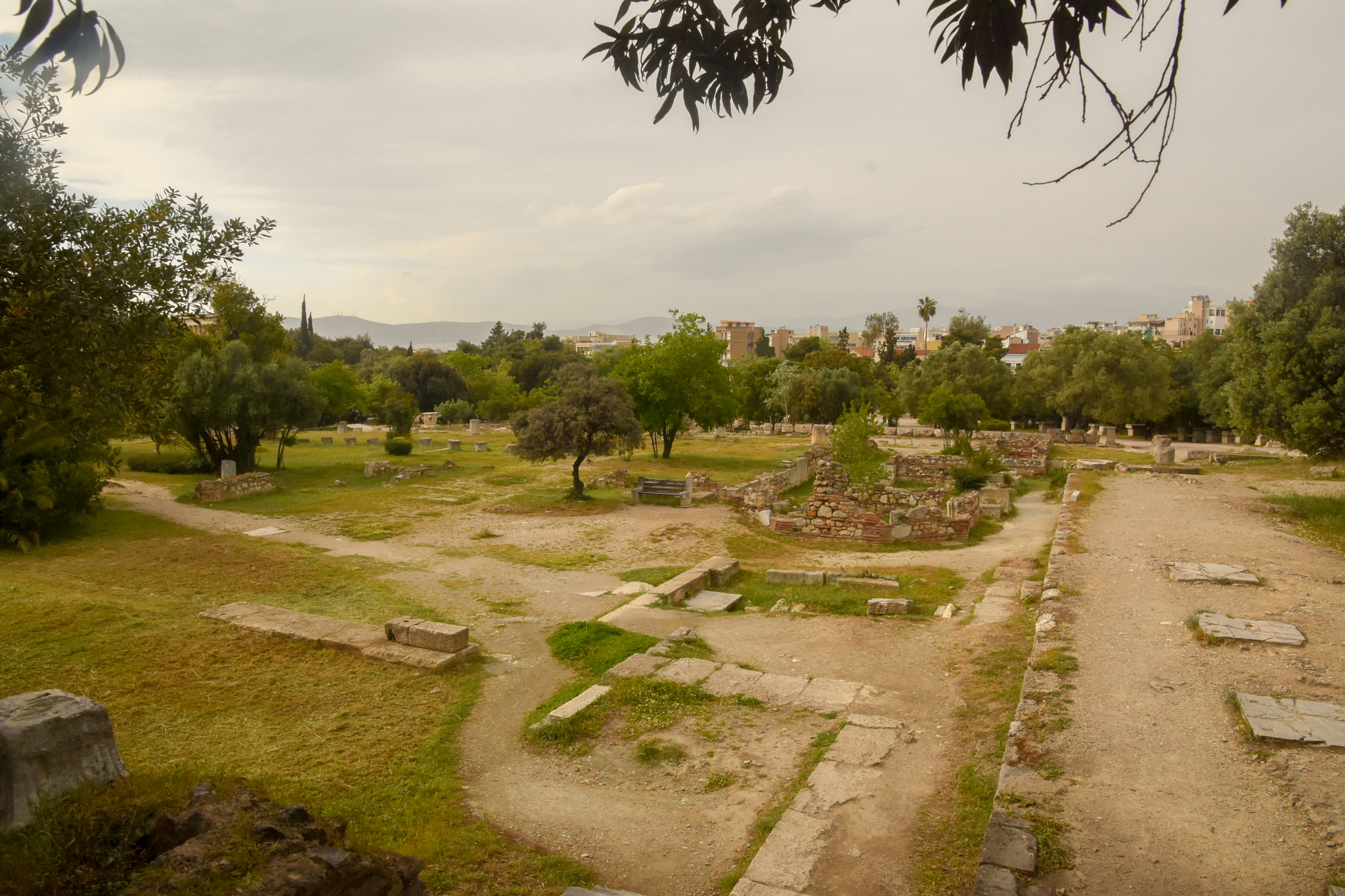
View of the South Square of the Agora of Athens, looking north-northwest. The east building is at the right hand side of the picture. Three of the marble bedding blocks are visible at far right. The marble seating of room D is visible in the central foreground.

The East Building was 39.8 m long north–south and 13.8 m wide east–west. Inside, a wall ran down the centre, dividing it into an eastern and a western half. Doorways (perhaps five of them) on the eastern side led out to a levelled terrace, which was 8 metres wide east–west. At the east edge of this terrace, a wide staircase led up to the Panathenaic Way, as did a narrower staircase at the terrace's north end. Five doorways on the western side opened onto the courtyard of the South Square. where the ground level is 1.7 metres below that of the terrace on the eastern side of the building.

The eastern half was a single large hall. The eastern hall had a marble chip mosaic floor. There were twelve marble bedding blocks in a row running down the centre of the hall, with six to the north of the main door and six to the south, each about 1.8-2.0 metres apart, but only the four southernmost blocks survive. Each of them measures 0.9 x 0.9 metres and has four sockets on top to hold a small piece of furniture in place.

The western half was built at a lower level than the eastern half and was divided into five rooms. Of the five rooms in the western half of the building, the northern two are completely lost. The middle room contained a stairway leading down from the eastern hall to the level of the South Square. The next room to the south had two columns on the west side and marble seating around the other sides; it served as an exedra. The door of the southernmost room opened into South Stoa II. This room contained two spouts in the wall which provided water.

== Function ==
The building served as the main entrance to the South Square. From the Panathenaic Way, people would have descended the staircase to the eastern terrace, entered the eastern hall, and then passed down the staircase in the central chamber on the western side, to emerge in the South Square. Beyond this, the function of the building is disputed, part of a wider debate on the function of the South Square, for which three purposes have been proposed: a gymnasium, a commercial area, or a law court. The first of these theories is no longer generally supported. The other two remain in play, with Boegehold suggesting that the space may have been multi-functional.

Before excavation of the East Buildings, Wilhelm Dörpfeld suggested that the area was the site of the Gymnasium of Ptolemy, which the second-century AD writer Pausanias states was "near the Agora". Homer Thompson and John Travlos revived this idea in 1966. Thompson proposed that the marble bedding blocks supported "tables or chests, to hold books and visual aids needed for class recitations," comparing similar blocks found in the Academy. He identified the two southern rooms on the western side as a classroom and a washroom respectively. This interpretation required the square building at the west end of the South Square to be the Temple of Theseus, but subsequent discoveries showed it to be the Aiakeion. Most scholars now place the Ptolemaion somewhere to the east of the Agora.

Immediately after the excavation of the East Building in 1952, Thompson believed that the South Square served as a designated area for commerce, but provided no reasoning for this interpretation. By 1966 Thompson had rejected this interpretation because excavations turned up no sign of shops. This interpretation was revived by Virginia Grace and John McK Camp in 1985 and 1986. Grace suggested that the marble bedding blocks in the East Building could have been used for the tables of merchants or bankers. In 2010 Camp thought that "perhaps a commercial function is the most probable" for the South Square.

The 1962 edition of the Agora site guide proposed that the South Square had been used as court buildings. In 1972, Thompson and Richard Wycherley adopted this position and argued for it in detail. On this interpretation, the East Building was the area where the jurors entered the complex. They identify the terrace east of the building as the space where the jurors waited to gain entry and that the marble bedding blocks in the eastern hall supported wooden chests (kibotia), in which the jurors would place their name cards (pinakia), so that they could be fed into the allotment machines (kleroteria) that were used to select which jurors would sit in which courts. The twelve chests corresponded to the twelve tribes into which the Athenian people were divided. The version of this process used in the late fourth century BC is described by Aristotle in the Athenaion Politeia, but the details may have changed by the time that the East Building was put into use in the second century BC. They also suggest that the water spouts in the southernmost room on the western side were used to provide drinking water for the jurors and to fill the water clocks (klepsydrai) used in the courts. This interpretation acquired further support from also supported by the fact that the South Square was built shortly after (and using material from) the Square Peristyle, which had hitherto served as Athens' lawcourt. Dickenson argues that strict control of entrance and exit was a crucial part of court buildings at Athens and argues that the East Building played that role for the South Square.

== Subsequent history and excavation ==
The East Building was demolished along with South Stoa II some time before the first century AD, probably because it had been damaged during the Sullan Sack of Athens in 86 BC. The area was used for iron smelters until the mid-first century AD. After that, marble workers employed the remains of the East Building as a workshop. The bedding blocks in the eastern hall of the East Building were used as stands for pieces of marble that were being sawn and bear many signs of damage from the marble saws. Marble dust from the sawing was washed off to the west, where it formed a 0.75 metre thick layer of sludge in the ruins of the eastern end of South Stoa II.

These were removed in the early second century AD. At this point the south wall of the South Stoa and the south wall of the East Building were rebuilt as a retaining wall to support an aqueduct running along the south side of the Agora to a set of baths. Unlike the South Stoa, the East Building was rebuilt at this time. The building may have been damaged in the Herulian Sack of 267 AD and the superstructure was spoliated to build the Post-Herulian Wall. The Gymnasium of the Giants was built over the area around 400 AD.

The remains of the East Building were uncovered during the American School of Classical Studies' excavations of the Agora. Margaret Crosby first uncovered traces of the building in 1952. At that time, the structure was referred to as the East Stoa, but the name was changed since subsequent analysis showed that the foundations could not have supported colonnades.

== Bibliography ==
- Thompson, Homer A. (1953). "Excavations in the Athenian Agora: 1952". Hesperia: The Journal of the American School of Classical Studies at Athens. 22 (1): 25–56. ISSN 0018-098X. JSTOR 146786.
- Thompson, Homer A. (1966). "Activity in the Athenian Agora 1960-1965". Hesperia: The Journal of the American School of Classical Studies at Athens. 35 (1): 37–54. ISSN 0018-098X. JSTOR 147312.
- Thompson, Homer A. (1968). "Activity in the Athenian Agora: 1966-1967". Hesperia: The Journal of the American School of Classical Studies at Athens. 37 (1): 43–56. ISSN 0018-098X. JSTOR 147537.
- Travlos, John (1971). Pictorial Dictionary of Ancient Athens. Thames and Hudson.
- Thompson, Homer A.; Wycherley, R. E. (1972). "The Agora of Athens: The History, Shape and Uses of an Ancient City Center". The Athenian Agora. 14: 68–70. doi:10.2307/3601981. ISSN 1558-8610. JSTOR 3601981.
- Grace, Virginia (1985). "The Middle Stoa Dated by Amphora Stamps". Hesperia: The Journal of the American School of Classical Studies at Athens. 54 (1): 1–54. ISSN 0018-098X. JSTOR 147764.
- Camp, John McK (1986). The Athenian Agora: excavations in the heart of classical Athens. New York, New York: Thames and Hudson. ISBN 9780500390214.
- Boegehold, Alan L. (1995). The Athenian Agora XXVIII: The Lawcourts at Athens: Sites, Buildings, Equipment, Procedure, and Testimonia. doi:10.2307/3602008. ISSN 1558-8610. JSTOR 3602008.
- Camp, John McK.; Mauzy, Craig A. (2010). The Athenian Agora: Site Guide (5th ed.). The American School of Classical Studies at Athens. pp. 167–168. doi:10.2972/j.ctv13nb7c4. ISBN 978-0-87661-657-4. JSTOR 10.2972/j.ctv13nb7c4.
- Dickenson, Christopher P. (2017). On the Agora: The evolution of a public space in Hellenistic and Roman Greece (c. 323 BC - 267 AD). Leiden: Brill. pp. 142–157. ISBN 978-90-04-32671-2.
- Di Cesare, R. (2018). "Hellenistic Gymnasia in the Heart of Athens". In Mania, U.; Trümper, M. (eds.). Development of Gymnasia and Graeco-Roman Cityscapes. Edition Topoi. pp. 215–235. ISBN 9783981968507.
