= South Square, Athens =

Complex of buildings of the Ancient Agora of Athens

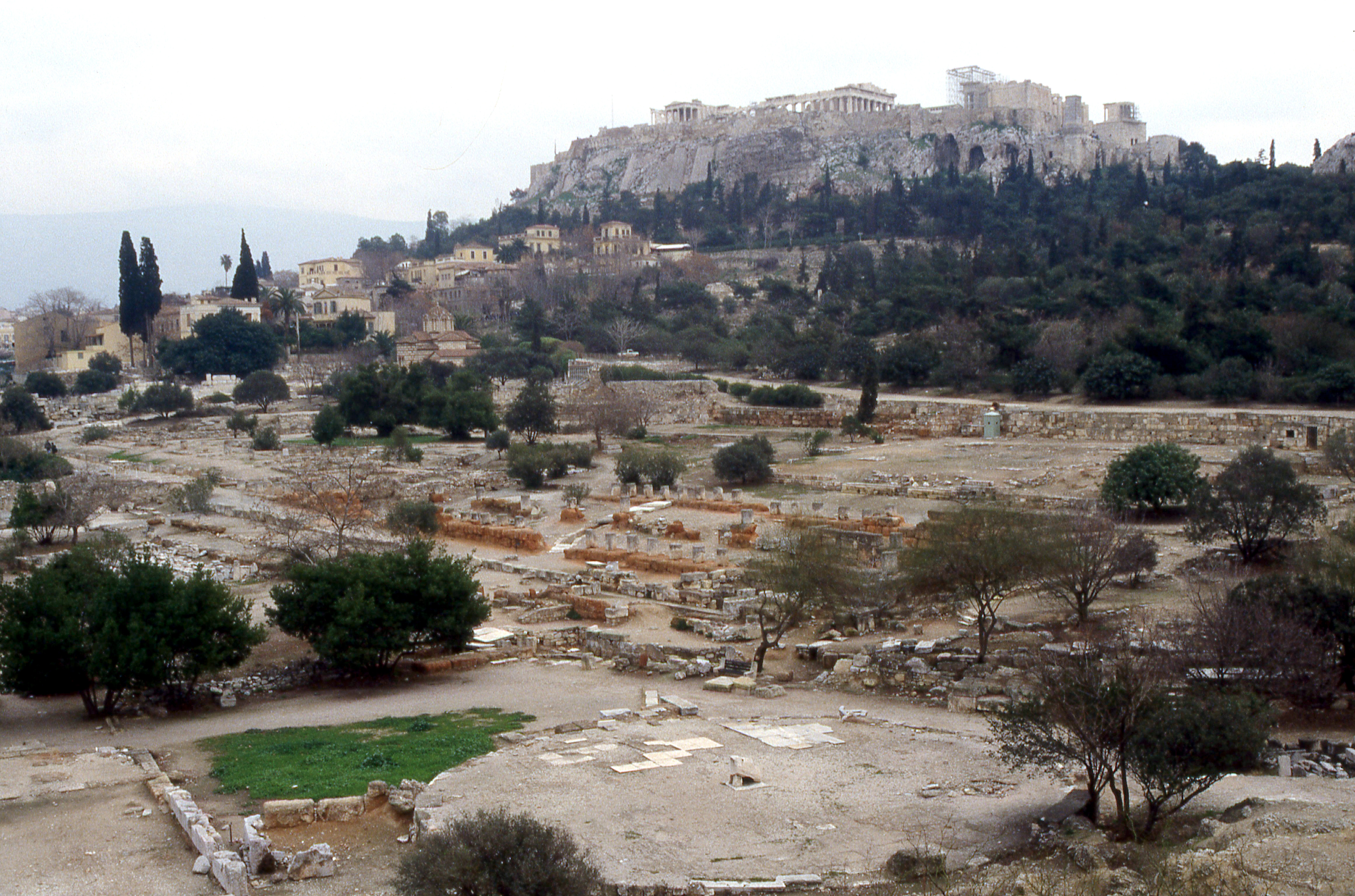
South Square in 1991, viewed from north-west (the circular foundation in the foreground is the Tholos)

The South Square is a complex of buildings located on the south side of the main square of the Ancient Agora of Athens. The name has been coined by modern scholars, as the ancient name of the area is unknown. The square took shape during the second and third quarters of the 2nd century BC, with the Middle Stoa cutting the old agora square into two parts, a larger north one, and a smaller south one.

== History ==
The South Square was created during an extensive building program in the 2nd century BC, often attributed to the benefaction of Hellenistic rulers. The new complex replaced the earlier South Stoa I, which had been built c. 430–420 BC. While the earlier stoa was aligned with an ancient street, the new South Square buildings were reoriented to align with the Aiakeion (previously identified as the Heliaia), creating a more enclosed and rectangular public space.

The area was badly damaged during the Sulla's attack on Athens in 87-86 BC.

== Architecture ==
Plan of the Ancient Agora of Athens in the Roman period (c. 200 AD). The South Square complex is located at the bottom, formed by the Middle Stoa (28), East Building (30), and South Stoa II (29). Aiakeion is the yellow square to the left of the South Stoa II.

The complex was defined by the construction of three major buildings, built in the following chronological order:

- Middle Stoa
- East Building
- South Stoa II

Aiakeion was rebuilt with a roof covering the previously open space and incorporated into the ensemble. The western side of the complex, left without a building, had a wall closing it off.

=== Middle Stoa ===
The Middle Stoa was erected first, likely around 180 BC. It was the largest stoa in the Agora, measuring nearly 150 meters long. The building was constructed of limestone with terracotta roof elements and featured Doric colonnades on both its north and south sides. It had no interior walls; instead, a central row of columns divided the interior. The north side faced the main agora square, while the south side opened onto the South Square.

=== East Building ===
The East Building joined the eastern ends of the Middle Stoa and South Stoa II, enclosing the east side of the square. It was a rectangular structure measuring approximately 12 m × 40 m (39 ft × 131 ft). The building was designed with a split level to accommodate the terrain: the western half, which faced the square's courtyard, was lower than the eastern half, which faced the Panathenaic Way. A marble-chip mosaic floor in the eastern hall featured twelve marble bases, which may have supported tables for bankers or moneychangers.

=== South Stoa II ===
The South Stoa II was built in the middle of the 2nd century BC, replacing the Classical-era South Stoa I. It ran parallel to the Middle Stoa and utilized a single Doric colonnade of limestone. Much of the building's superstructure was composed of reused materials from a 4th-century BC building. Unlike its predecessor, it did not contain rooms behind the colonnade, though a small fountain house was set into the back wall.

=== Temples ===
Near the middle of the square lie the remains of two small buildings, consisting of scattered foundation stones. Based on their ground plans, these structures have been identified as temples. The eastern building was peripteral, featuring columns on all four sides. The western building possessed a broad cella with a porch located only on its east end. Both temples date to the Hellenistic period, likely the late 2nd century BC, and appear to have been damaged during the Roman siege of Athens in 86 BC. There is currently no evidence indicating which divinities were worshipped in either temple.

== Function ==
The function of South Square is disputed. It is generally considered to have served a primarily commercial function, although gymnasium, lawcourt complex, and sanctuary have been proposed. Since South Stoa I is assumed to have commercial function, John McK. Camp had considered it likely that the replacement buildings were used similarly. However, Christopher P. Dickenson, a historian and archaeologist, argues that South Stoa I was likely an administrative building (with a dining room for officials) rather than a commercial one, undermining the argument for continuity of a mercantile function.

The identification as a gymnasium, proposed by Homer Thompson, relied on Pausanias' mention of the Gymnasium of Ptolemy; however, it is now generally accepted that Pausanias was referring to the Roman Agora rather than the Classical agora's south side.

Thompson and Richard Ernest Wycherley later revised the interpretation of the complex, suggesting it was built to house the law courts following the demolition of the Square Peristyle Building. This view is supported by the reuse of materials from the Square Peristyle in South Stoa II and the architectural layout of the square, which featured controlled access via screen walls and narrow entrances, a design ill-suited for a commercial market. Archaeological finds within the complex, such as fragments of kleroteria and marble bedding blocks potentially used for wooden tribal boxes (and interpreted as places for bankers and money changers in the commercial version), further support a judicial or administrative function. Although Alan Boegehold questioned whether the square was too large for the courts, the subsequent construction of temples within the open space suggests a religious or civic usage rather than a commercial one. Furthermore, the water clock associated with the area went out of use when the square was isolated by the Middle Stoa, and was seemingly replaced by the Tower of the Winds to the east; this suggests that commercial activity was shifting eastward, leaving the South Square for political or legal administration.

== Sources ==
- Camp, John McK. (1986). The Athenian Agora: Excavations in the Heart of Classical Athens. London: Thames and Hudson. ISBN 9780500390214.
- Camp, John McK. (2001). The Archaeology of Athens. New Haven & London: Yale University Press. ISBN 9780300081978.
- Camp, John McK. (2003). The Athenian Agora: A Short Guide. American School of Classical Studies at Athens. ISBN 9780876616437.
- Camp, John McK. (2010-02-28). "South Square". The Athenian Agora: Site Guide (5th ed.). American School of Classical Studies at Athens. doi:10.2972/j.ctv13nb7c4. ISBN 978-1-62139-016-9.
- Dickenson, Christopher P. (2017). "The Function of the New South Square at Athens". On the Agora: The Evolution of a Public Space in Hellenistic and Roman Greece (c. 323 BC – 267 AD). Leiden: Brill. ISBN 978-90-04-32671-2.
- Thompson, Homer A. (1954). The Athenian Agora: A Guide to the Excavations. Athens: American School of Classical Studies at Athens.
