= Square Peristyle =

Building in the Agora of Athens

Plan of the Ancient Agora of Athens, with the Square Peristyle (22).

The Square Peristyle is the modern name for a structure on the east side of the Ancient Agora of Athens, which was among the largest peristyles built in Classical Greece. Construction began around 300 BC, but was abandoned ca. 285-275 BC, leaving the structure unfinished. It probably served as Athens' law courts at the beginning of the Hellenistic period, but fell out of use. In the early second century BC the building was demolished and the material was reused in South Stoa II, on the southern side of the Agora. The Stoa of Attalos was subsequently built over the top of its foundations.

Traces of the structure were revealed by American excavations in the 1950s, but were covered over shortly thereafter when the Stoa of Attalos was rebuilt.

== Description ==
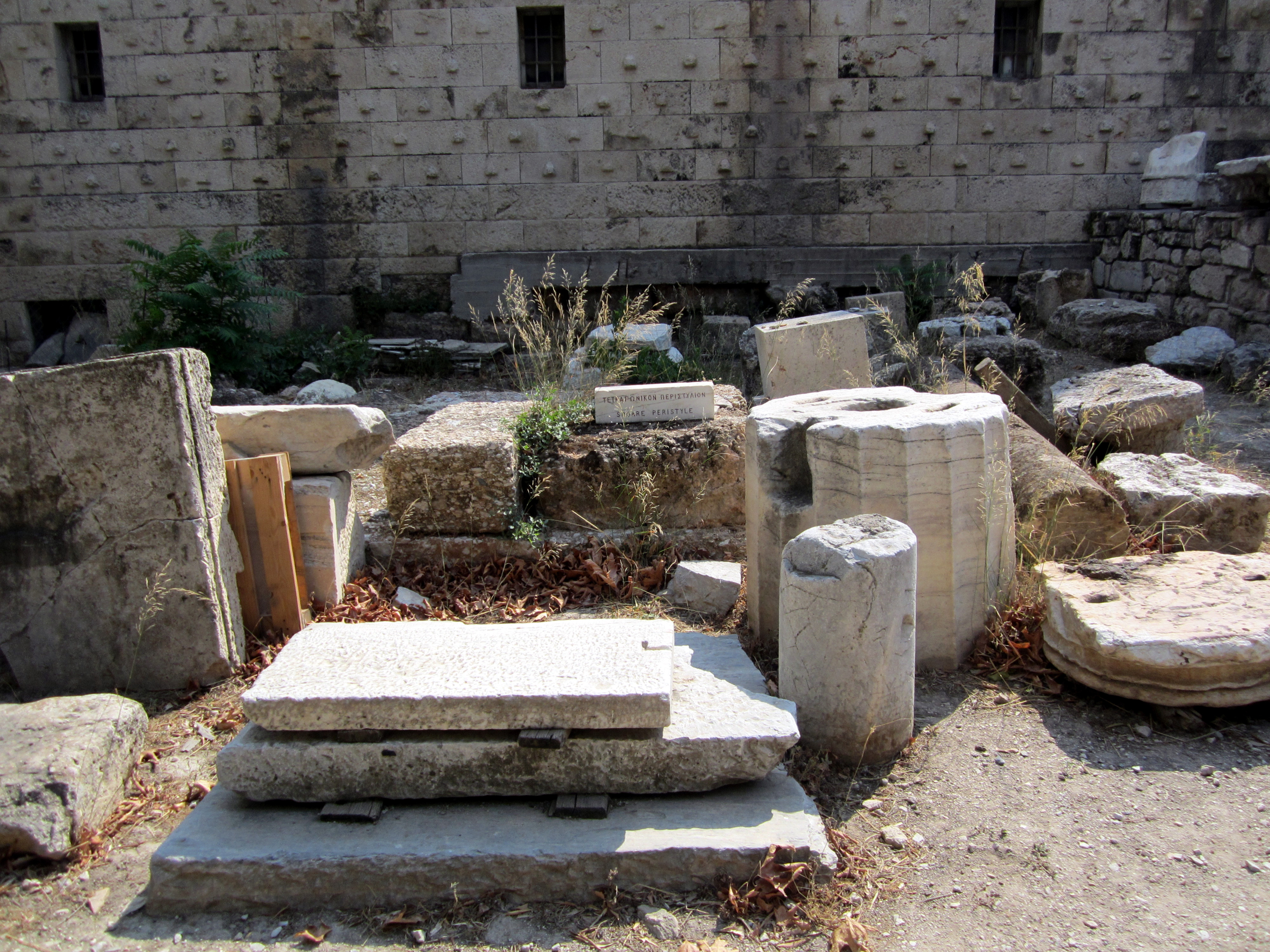
Visible remnants of the north wall of the Square Peristyle to the north of the Stoa of Attalos.

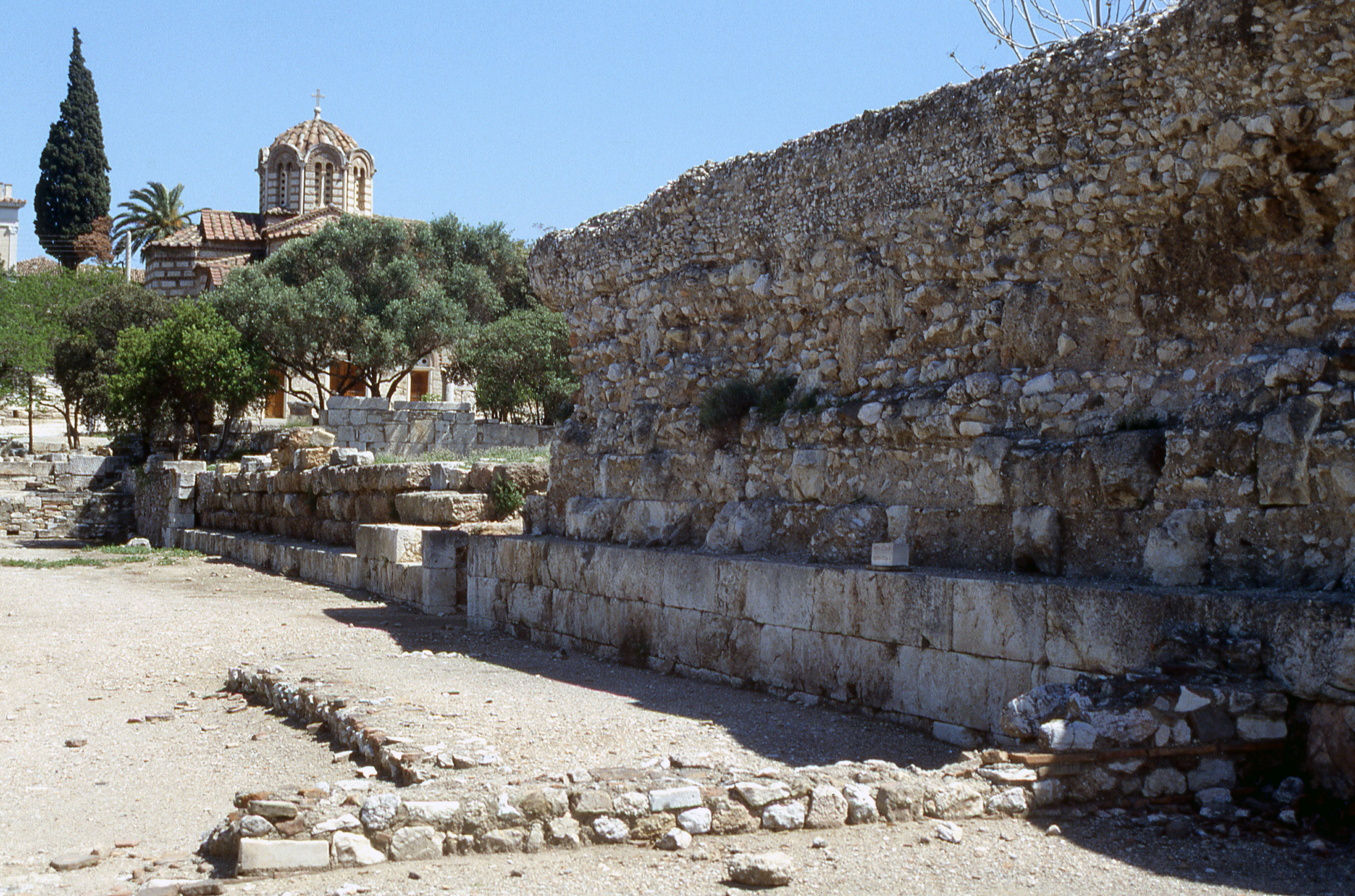
North wall of the Square Peristyle, rebuilt as the back wall of South Stoa II.

The structure stood on the east side of the Agora, next to the Panathenaic Way and would have dominated the space in the early Hellenistic period. The north side is aligned with an east–west cross-road, the southwest corner touched the Panathenaic Way. It was a square building with sides of 58.56 metres in length, surrounding a central courtyard, which was lined with columns in the Doric order. It was the largest of at least seven stoas built in Athens in the late fourth and early third centuries BC, and the second-largest peristyle attempted in Greece up to that time, after the Anactorium at Vergina. The use of a peristyle design may have been inspired by the nearby Pompeion, but there was no close model for the design. Some aspects of the colonnade and entablature are modelled on the Stoa Poikile, the Stoa of Zeus, and the Propylaea.

The building was never completed. The north wing was certainly finished, while on the south side the foundations were not even laid. A large entranceway on the west side and a small one on the east were planned, but never built - the spaces were simply left open. At least the northern parts of the western and eastern wings were finished, but probably not for their full length. Many blocks still have rough surfaces, which were to protect them during transport and then be chiselled off once they were in situ.

The structure was built using a basic unit of 0.32 metres - shorter than the normal unit for Classical Athenian buildings, which was 0.326-0.327 metres. The outer walls were made out of mudbrick, probably because it was cheap. The internal colonnade and entablature was made out of limestone from the Kara quarry at the foothills of Mount Hymettus. This stone resembled marble, but was easier to work and Kara was closer to the city than the marble quarries.

=== Outer walls ===
The north wall was one of the best-preserved sections, since it acts as a retaining wall and was thus incorporated into the stoa of Attalos and the Post-Herulian Wall. It survives to a height of nine courses. The lower courses were set in the bedrock and made of soft, creamy poros which was meant to be covered over by soil so that it was not visible. The upper section has made from hard grey poros. Remnants of the mudbrick wall of the superstructure were found, fallen to the south. Much of the wall was relocated to form the back wall of South Stoa II, where it is most easily visible.

The north and south ends of the west wall are attested. In the north part of the wall, two courses of soft, white poros were preserved, many of them repurposed from a predecessor structure, Building A. The south part of the wall is made of brick-red conglomerate blocks, preserved in only a single course. The middle 17 metres of the west wall are totally missing and it appears that no foundations were ever laid. It was probably intended that there would be a monumental entrance gate here, but it was never built. A monument base was erected in the Agora in front of the west wall.

The foundation trench for the east wall is preserved for almost its entire length, but almost all of the stone blocks, which were brick-red conglomerate, have been repurposed. There is a 2.25-metre gap at the middle of the wall. This was probably intended for a smaller secondary entrance gate, but it was apparently also left unfinished. The bedrock has been worn down by heavy traffic. There are traces of a cobblestone road leading away to the east.

The foundation trench for the south wall was roughly dug, but then allowed to fill up with dirt by 275 BC; no stones were ever laid. A row of shops was subsequently erected on the area where this wall should have stood.

=== Internal courtyard ===
The distance between the exterior walls and the internal colonnade was 8.00 metres, larger than any earlier Greek peristyle. The foundations for the internal colonnade were fully preserved on the northern side, where they reached a height of six or seven courses. There are also traces in the west, the south-western corner and the south-eastern corner. Large conglomerate piers supported the columns, which were set 3.00 metres apart; the area between these piers was filled in with packed earth, blocked from view by low masonry walls. On top of this was the crepidoma, consisting of blocks placed on top of the conglomerate piers and the packed earth between them (two were found in situ in the north-eastern corner; others are scattered throughout the Agora). This was not fully supported by the packed earth below; the steps would have sagged noticeably. Two stylobate blocks are also preserved. Several of these blocks are inscribed with single letters (Η, Ι, Ζ, Κ, Μ), which are probably not mason's marks, but rather labels for seating bays.

Fragments of the columns are found throughout central Athens. They were in the Doric order and had a diameter of 0.90 metres at the base, tapering to 0.74 metres at the top. The height of the shaft is unknown; 5.52 metres would be expected based on the proportions of the rest of the structure. The capitals were 0.325 metres high. The fluting was completed only for the bottom 7 centimetres.

The entablature is generally conservative, recalling 5th-century BC models. Above the columns was an epistyle (almost entirely lost) and a 0.66-metre-high frieze course which employed a complicated cantilevering system to ensure that all the weight of the roof rests directly on the columns, which was particularly important since the 3 metre spans between the columns were larger than any previous Greek peristyle. None of the metopes survive; some of the triglyphs do. Above the frieze was the geison; traces of paint show that the mutules were blue, the viae between were red; and the cyma reversa had a leaf pattern. Several are inscribed with setting marks in the corners. Nothing of the roof remains, but it was probably a single-pitched roof.

The floor of the courtyard was packed clay, that sloped down slightly to the north to ensure drainage. Two sturdy poros drains ran under the north wing of the peristyle and had their output 0.5 metres above the northern cross-road, where the street's terracotta gutter. The stones of the drain are barely worn, suggesting that they blocked up and stopped working, as the floor level of the courtyard rose over time.

=== The Brick Building ===
A rectangular mudbrick building was built over the foundations of the southeast corner of the Square Peristyle ca. 175-165 BC, replacing a predecessor building of which very little is known. It was 28.40 metres long and 9.48 metres wide and contained five shops (labelled A-E), facing north. Each shop consisted of a square front room measuring 5 x 5 metres and a smaller back room that was 5 metres wide and 2.9 metres long. A pre-existing water channel ran under the Brick Building from southwest to northeast; it is unclear when it was built. Shop A had a back door in the back room and iron slag found in the front room suggests it was used for metalworking. Shop B, directly under the Stoa of Attalos, is the best-preserved. A collection of braziers and other tableware dumped behind it, suggest that it was a tavern or restaurant. The other shops are preserved only in traces.

The foundation of the front wall consisted of a row of conglomerate blocks with orthostates on top, which supported a mudbrick wall. There were large blocks for the thresholds of the front doors of each of the shops. The foundations of the other walls were simply limestone rubble. A few Laconian roof tiles were found behind shop B. The building was demolished to make way for the Stoa of Attalos around 150 BC.

== History ==
Plan of the Athenian Agora in the Roman period, with the Stoa of Attalos (32), South Stoa II (29), and the East Building (30).

=== Predecessors ===
The Square Peristyle was preceded by a set of structures known as Buildings A-D, built in the late fifth century, replacing earlier private houses. Building A was built between 415 and 400 BC, Building B around the same time, Building C around 340 BC, and Building D around 325 BC. The structures were probably law courts, since small finds in Building A include bronze voting ballots for jurors. The construction of A may have been part of the process of Athenian legal reform begun in 410 BC after the overthrow of the regime of the Four Hundred. This process involved the law courts and included efforts to avoid corruption, such as the randomised allotment of jurors to their courts on a daily rather than an annual basis. An open area to the south of Building A was probably used for the complicated allotment procedure undertaken every morning when the courts were in session. Townsend suggests that the construction of a physical building may have had the important role of giving "material substance to an otherwise all too abstract process" and proposes that Building A may have housed the Helaea court. A, B, and C may be the "first, middle, and third of the new courts," mentioned by Agora XIX P26, an inscription from 342/1 BC. One of the ballots found in Building A appears to date after the introduction of two new Athenian tribes in 307/6 BC, indicating that it was still in use at this date.

=== Construction ===
Construction of the Square Peristyle was begun around 300 BC. The terminus post quem is provided by a coin of Demetrius Poliorcetes minted ca. 300–295, which was found in construction fill beneath the north colonnade. Townsend suggests construction began in the anti-monarchic, pro-democratic atmosphere after Demetrius left Athens in 302 BC. Athenian resources were limited in this period and several decisions about the structure were taken for economic reasons, such as the use of mudbrick and Kara limestone for the superstructure and the omission of orthostates from the outer walls.

While Buildings A-D were being demolished, a fifth structure, Building E, was erected between C and D in what would become the central courtyard of the peristyle, to act as a temporary replacement for the law courts. Construction of the Square Peristyle began at the northern end, where the ground level had to be raised. The foundations of the outer wall were built first, then those of the colonnade, then the colonnade itself, then the mud-brick outer walls and the roof. Townsend argues that this process proceeded at different rates in different parts of the structure and work never even began on the south wing. He suggests that it was left to last because it was the main entry point to the site during construction and because the height of the bedrock in this area meant that it was necessary to cut it down before the foundations could be laid. Pfaff argues that there was conscious change of plans early in the building's construction, removing the southern wing.

The failure to bring the project to completion was probably connected with the financial and political troubles that afflicted Athens during the Wars of the Diadochi at the start of the third century. The foundations for the south wall were filled in around 285-275 BC, as shown by amphora handles found in the fill. This was the point when plans to build the south end were definitively abandoned. Townsend considers the failure to complete the structure to be symbolic of the decreased importance of the court system in Athenian politics in the Hellenistic period.

During construction of the monument base on the west side of the structure, workmen disturbed a Mycenaean grave. They reburied the grave and relocated the base further to the west in response.

=== Function ===
The function of the structure as a lawcourt is indicated by the function of the previous buildings on the site. Peristyles like this were used as the exercise areas for gymnasia and as enclosed marketplaces, but neither function fits the Square Peristyle, since there are no rooms behind the colonnade for changing rooms, shops, or storerooms. The open area to the west of the Peristyle could have been used as a mustering area for the complex daily process of allocating jurors to individual courts, which is described by the late fourth-century Constitution of the Athenians. The entrance on the west side is wide enough for the ten separate entranceways to the court described by that work. Townsend proposes that each corner of the peristyle was a single court. The 500 jurors for each case would have been seated on 25 benches, arranged perpendicular to the outer wall, facing towards the corner. The Constitution says that jurors were given a random letter that assigned them to one these seating areas - the letters carved on the blocks of the crepidoma may have indicated which space corresponded to which letter. With a different arrangement of benches, the Peristyle would have been able to accommodate trials with 6,000 jurors, which were used by the Athenian democracy for the most serious cases.

Pfaff questions whether the structure ever actually functioned. It was poorly maintained in the third century. The ground level in the courtyard was allowed to rise and block the drains on the north side. Makeshift brick walls were erected in the north colonnade and to the south at some point. Later, the north wall collapsed inwards.

=== Deterioration and demolition ===
In the early second century BC, the Square Peristyle was systematically demolished, including most of the foundations. This date is indicated by a layer of fill used to smooth out the area once the stonework was removed. The foundations of the outer north wall were left in place because they served as a retaining wall. Similar fill appears elsewhere in the Agora and seems to indicate a large scale remodelling of the Agora in the period after the Second Macedonian War, which also involved the construction of the Middle Stoa. It is possible that the Stoa of Attalos was already envisioned at this time, although it was not built on the area formerly occupied by the Square Peristyle until around 150 BC. Most of the stones and timbers from the Square Peristyle were eventually used to build the new South Stoa II on the south side of the Agora, with the same dimensions and appearance, but there may have been thirty years between the demolition of the peristyle and the construction of the new stoa. Leftover stones were used for the East Building, the Aiakeion, and later structures throughout Athens.

The Brick Building stood over the southeast corner of the Square Peristyle between ca. 175-165 and 150 BC, when it was demolished to make way for the Stoa of Attalos. The eastern part of the north wing of the Square Peristyle was used as the basis for a structure behind the Stoa of Attalos at some point. Another structure was built nearby. Both were demolished to make way for a large Roman structure with a mosaic floor in the second century AD. The Donor's Monument and the Bema took advantage of the terrace wall of the western side of the Peristyle, when they were built in front of the Stoa of Attalos, in the early first century BC. The foundations were further disrupted when the area was levelled in the late first century BC. In the second century AD, the remnants to the west of the Stoa of Attalos were further disrupted when the Hadrianic Basilica and Monopteros were built over the area.

== Excavation ==
Detection of the Square Peristyle was difficult because its remains are beneath the foundations of the Stoa of Attalos. The area of the Stoa of Attalus was first excavated by the Greek Archaeological Society in 1859-1862 and 1898–1902, but only one of their soundings encountered part of the Square Peristyle, which was interpreted as a fountain house. The excavations of the Agora undertaken by the American School of Classical Studies began 1933, but did not seriously investigate the area in the period before World War II. Most of the excavation of the area was undertaken by Homer Thompson and Eugene Vanderpool between 1949 and 1955, with a few further trenches dug in 1955, 1956, and 1958.

The excavations overlapped with the reconstruction of the Stoa of Attalos, which began in 1953. This meant that excavations had to be carried out quickly. Since the completion of the Stoa in 1956, most of the remains of the Square Peristyle are no longer visible or accessible, but a section of the northern wall is still visible in the Stoa's basement. The southwestern corner is outside the stoa and has never been excavated, but has probably been destroyed by the roots of trees planted in the area in the 1950s.

== Bibliography ==
- Townsend, Rhys F. (1995). Agora XXVII: The East Side of the Agora: The Remains beneath the Stoa of Attalos. Princeton, NJ: American School of Classical Studies at Athens. pp. iii–248. JSTOR 3602006.
- Pfaff, Christopher A. (1996). "Review of The Athenian Agora XXVII: The East Side of the Agora: The Remains beneath the Stoa of Attalos". American Journal of Archaeology. 100 (3): 620–621. doi:10.2307/507045. ISSN 0002-9114. JSTOR 507045.
