= South Stoa II (Athens) =

Archaelogical site in Greece

Anachronistic plan of the Ancient Agora of Athens in the Roman Imperial period. South Stoa II is no. 29.

South Stoa II was a stoa on the south side of the Agora in ancient Athens. It formed the south side of an enclosed complex called the South Square, which was built in the mid-second century BC and may have been intended for use as lawcourts.

== Location ==
South Stoa II was a long stoa on the south edge of the Agora, with a colonnade facing north. It formed the south side of a long rectangular courtyard at the south end of the Agora, known as the South Square, most of which was built in the mid-second century BC. The east side of this complex was formed by the East building. The north edge by the Middle Stoa, which ran parallel to South Stoa II. The west side was closed off by the pre-existing Aiakeion and Southwest Fountain House, which also set the orientation for the rest of the complex. There appear to have been two late second century temples in the centre of the courtyard; a peripteral temple at the west end and a porch temple to the east, but these are very poorly known.

== Description ==
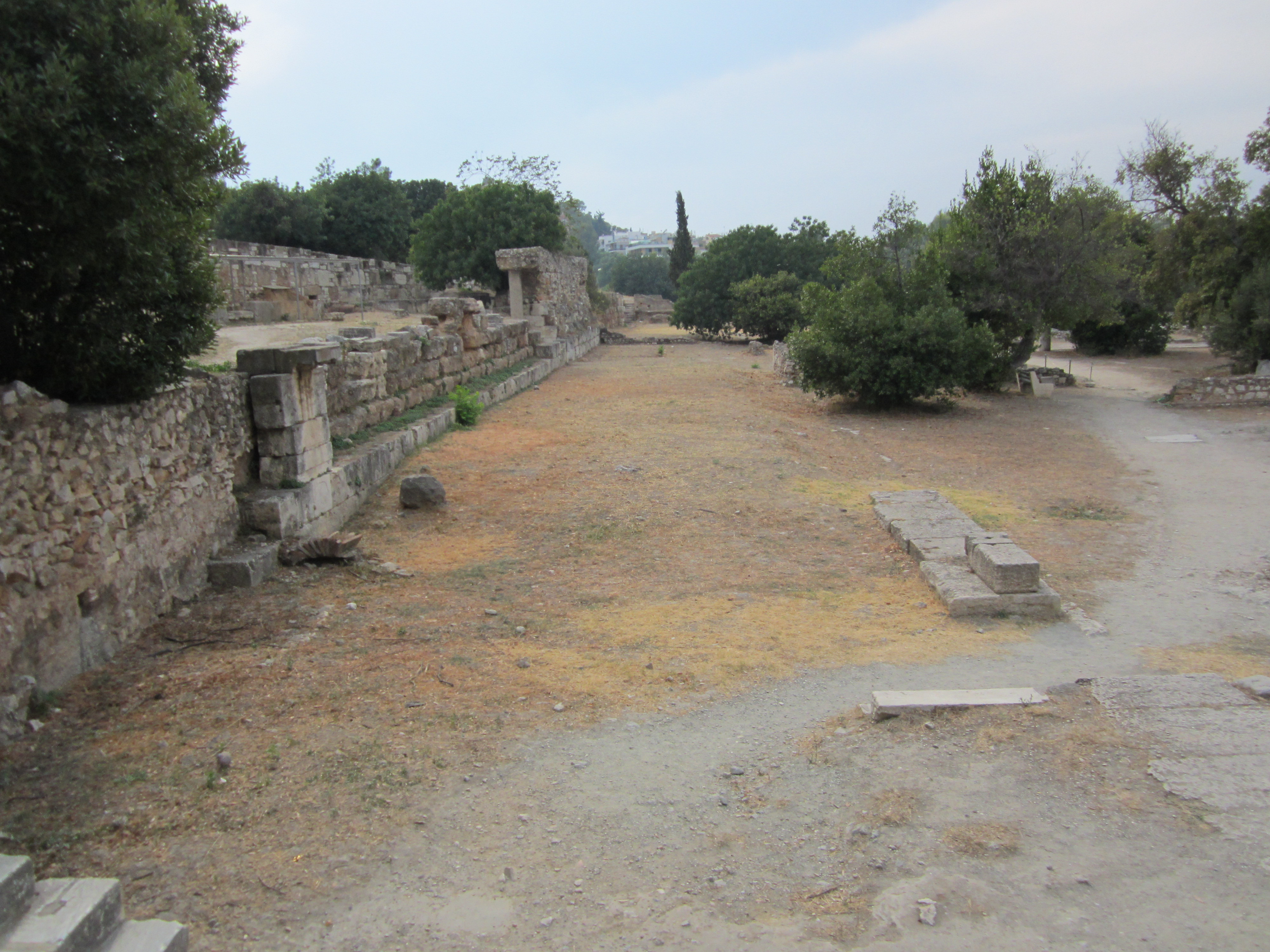
Remains of South Stoa II, looking west.

South Stoa II was a simple Doric colonnade facing to the north. It was 93 metres long from east to west and 8.5 metres deep north–south. The colonnade consisted of 30 columns, made of hard gray poros. The intercolumnation was 3.01 metres apart (unusually wide). At the east and west ends there was a screen wall running between the columns, as was common in Hellenistic stoas. The back wall was made of limestone blocks with conglomerate behind and served as a retaining wall for the higher ground behind it. There was a fountain in a vaulted niche in the back wall of the stoa, in line with the 12th intercolumnation from the east end. This was supplied by an aqueduct under the street behind the stoa.

=== Construction ===
The stoa was built in the mid-second century BC, as indicated by pottery found in the foundation trenches. It replaced South Stoa I, which had been built in the late fourth century BC. It was built on a different orientation (determined by the Aiakeion) and at a lower level, so that its construction involved cutting into the bedrock and destroyed all traces of the western portion of South Stoa I. The columns, steps and entablature of the facade, as well as the facing of the back wall, the roof tiles, and probably the roof timbers, were recycled from the Square Peristyle, which had been built in the northeast corner of the Agora around 300 BC and demolished in the early second century BC. Up to thirty years may have passed between this demolition and the construction of South Stoa II. Several of the blocks of the steps retain markings from blocks that lay on top of them in the Square Peristyle.

=== Function ===
Because the function of the South Square as a whole is debated, it is not clear what South Stoa II was used for. Thompson and Wycherley argued that the whole South Square was an expansion of the lawcourt located in the Aiakeion. In this case, South Stoa II would have been used for jury trials. This argument is strengthened by the discovery of several allotment machines in the nearby Middle Stoa and the likelihood that the Square Peristyle had also served as lawcourts. Camp prefers an early argument that the area was intended as a dedicated commercial space, in which case the stoa may have contained shops.

== Destruction and excavation ==
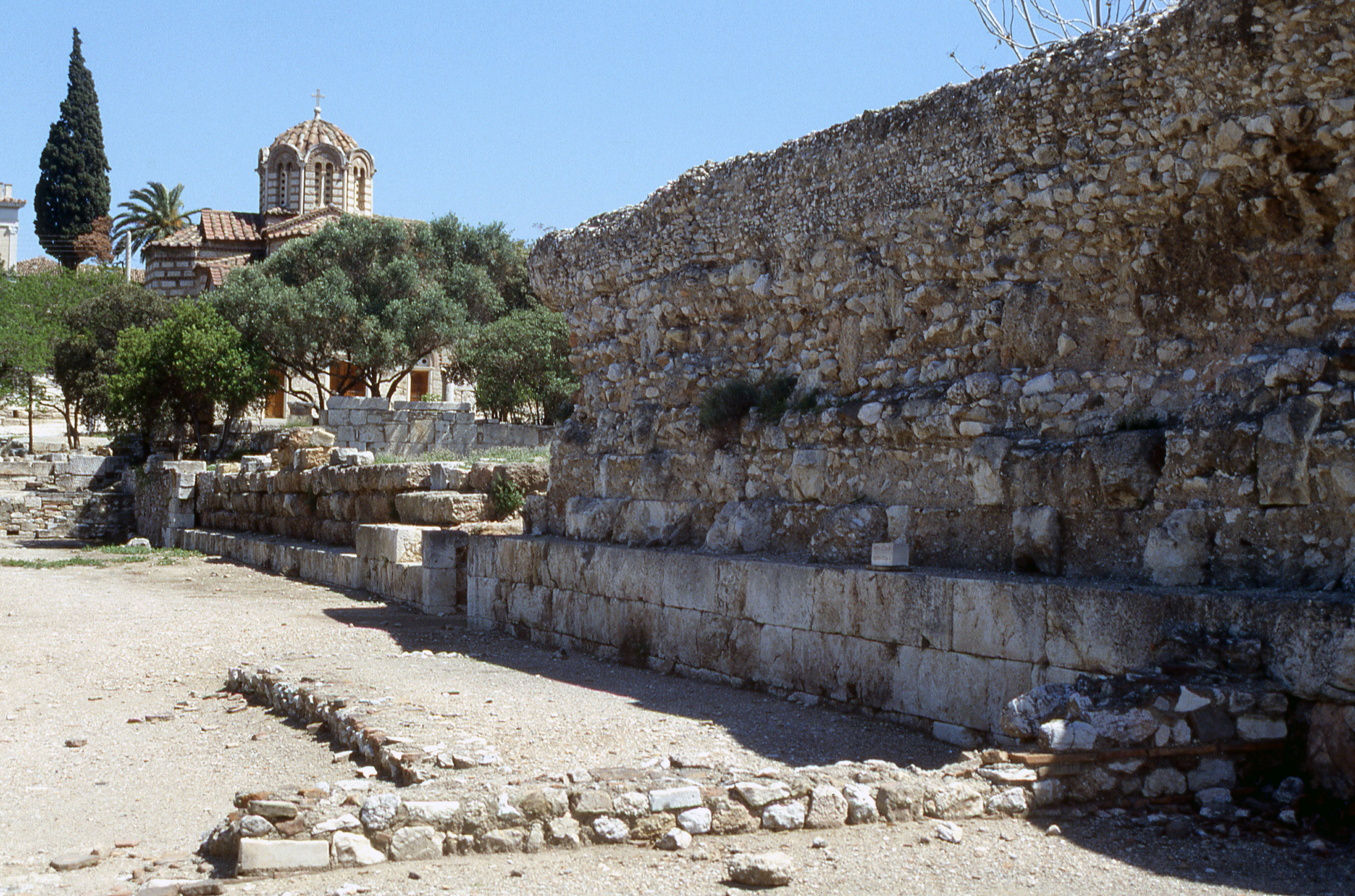
Remains of the rear wall of South Stoa II, with the second century AD retaining wall on top of it.

The stoa was demolished and the area taken over by workshops some time before the first century AD. Fragments from it were used as material for other buildings around Athens, including the Library of Pantainos (built ca. 100 AD). It was probably demolished as a result of damage sustained during the Sullan Sack of Athens in 86 BC.

The area was used iron smelters until the mid-first century AD and then marble sculptors. These were removed in the early second century AD, when the back wall of the stoa was rebuilt as a retaining wall to support an aqueduct built along the south edge of the Agora.

The remains of the stoa were uncovered during the American School of Classical Studies' excavations of the Agora. The area was part of excavations directed by Eugene Vanderpool in 1936 and by Margaret Crosby in 1952–1953, but this work did not descend to the level of South Stoa II, which was first uncovered in excavations of 1959 led by Homer Thompson.

== Bibliography ==
- Thompson, Homer A. (1953). "Excavations in the Athenian Agora: 1952". Hesperia: The Journal of the American School of Classical Studies at Athens. 22 (1): 25–56. doi:10.2307/146786. ISSN 0018-098X.
- Thompson, Homer A. (1954). "Excavations in the Athenian Agora: 1953". Hesperia: The Journal of the American School of Classical Studies at Athens. 23 (1): 48–50. doi:10.2307/146723. ISSN 0018-098X.
- Thompson, Homer A. (1960). "Activities in the Athenian Agora: 1959". Hesperia: The Journal of the American School of Classical Studies at Athens. 29 (4): 359–363. doi:10.2307/147159. ISSN 0018-098X.
- Thompson, Homer A.; Wycherley, R. E. (1972). "The Agora of Athens: The History, Shape and Uses of an Ancient City Center". The Athenian Agora. 14: 74–78. doi:10.2307/3601981. ISSN 1558-8610.
- Townsend, Rhys F. (1995). Agora XXVII: The East Side of the Agora: The Remains beneath the Stoa of Attalos. Princeton, NJ: American School of Classical Studies at Athens. pp. iii–248.
- Camp, John McK.; Mauzy, Craig A. (2010). The Athenian Agora: Site Guide (5th ed.). The American School of Classical Studies at Athens. pp. 161–164. ISBN 978-0-87661-657-4.
