= Emily Grace Kazakévich =

American-Soviet classicist and historian

- Born: February 2, 1911
- Died: July 12, 1987 (aged 76)
- Occupation: Scholar of Classics
- Spouse: Vladimir Dmitrievich Kazakévich

Emily Grace Kazakévich (Russian: Эмилия Львовна Казакевич; Emiliya L’vovna Kazakévich; 1911-1987) was an American-Soviet scholar of Classics and ancient history, who was especially influential in the study of slavery in ancient Greece.

== Biography ==
Emily Randolph Grace was born to Lee Ashley and Virginia Fitz-Randolph Grace of New York City. She was one of six siblings, including American archaeologist Virginia Randolph Grace.

She attended Bryn Mawr College, where she received a B.A. in Greek cum laude in 1933 and received an M.A. in Greek in 1934. In 1935, she entered the graduate program in Classics at Yale University. In 1936-1937, she studied at the American School of Classical Studies in Athens. She received her Ph.D. from Yale on June 21, 1949, with the dissertation The Sparta of Agis and Cleomenes: A Study of the Ancient Literary Sources.

Emily Grace joined the Communist Party of the United States in 1936 and served as the membership secretary of the West Side of Manhattan cell of CPUSA. In this role, she enrolled Moses Finley in the Party in 1937-8. In 1942, Emily Grace married the economist Vladimir Dmitrievich Kazakévich, who was a White Russian émigré. He was a lecturer at Columbia University and Cornell University. Both were Marxists, and collaborated on translating Communist literature from Russian into English for an American audience in the 1940s. On June 5, 1949, two weeks before Emily received her Ph.D. diploma from Yale, Elizabeth Bentley named Vladimir Kazakévich as a Soviet spy to the Senate Judiciary Committee. Vladimir was accused of passing intelligence to Russian operatives while teaching an intensive Russian language and culture program at Cornell University for the United States Army. Emily and Vladimir fled to the Soviet Union soon after, where they eventually settled in Moscow.

In 1953, the couple were appointed to the USSR Academy of Sciences, Vladimir conducting research in the Institute of Economics and Emily in the Institute of World History. She worked there as a researcher for three decades, retiring in 1984. In 1986, she returned to the United States, where she died one year later.

== Scholarship ==
Emily Grace Kazakévich was a frequent correspondent with Greek historians Moses Finley and Ron Stroud. She translated works by Soviet scholars into English, bringing them to a wider audience. Almost the entirety of her scholarly output, however, was published in Russian during the Cold War, primarily in Vestnik drevnei istorii (The Russian Academy of Sciences' Journal of Ancient History), and received limited attention outside the Soviet Union. Only in recent decades have translations of her published articles appeared in English. Among her most significant work are a series of articles on the legal status of slaves and freedmen in ancient Athens, as well as Athenian homicide law. She also wrote on concubines in Classical Athens.
