= Middle Stoa =

- Μέση Στοά
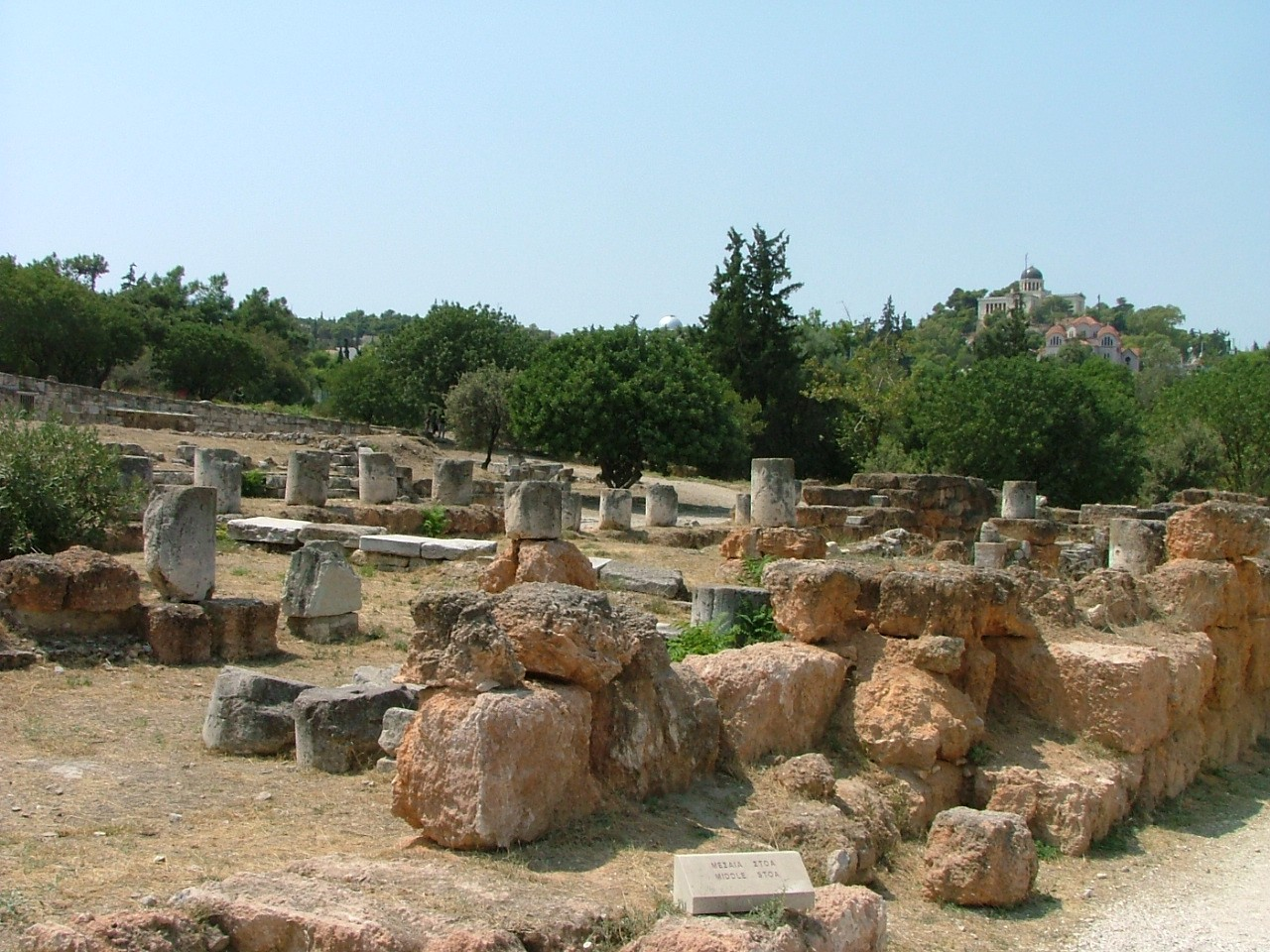
- Remains of the Middle Stoa in the Agora of Athens.

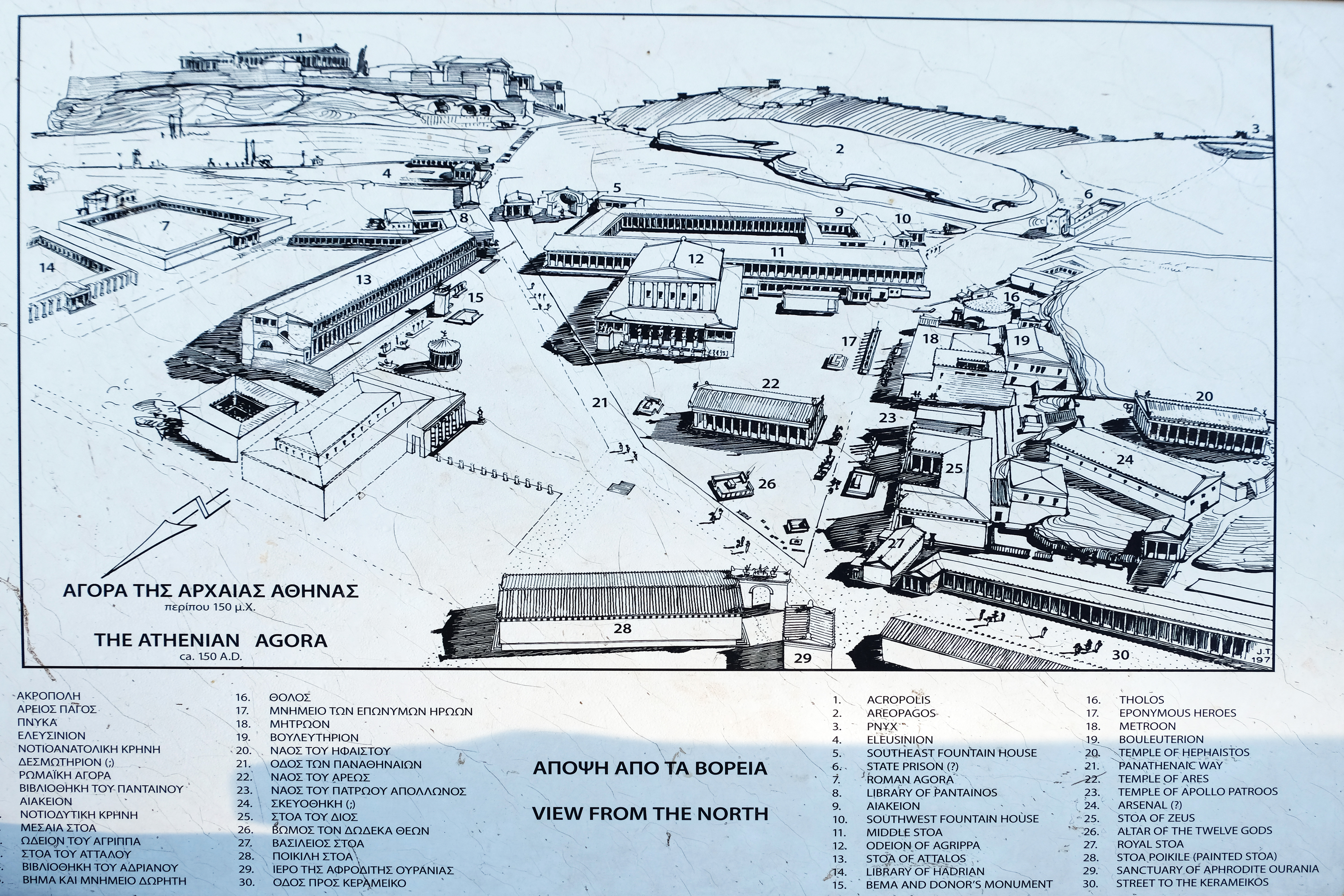
- The Middle Stoa is marked with number 11 in the complex of Agora buildings.

General information
- Type: Stoa (portico)
- Location: Ancient Agora of Athens, Athens, Greece
- Year built: c. 180–140 BC

Dimensions
- Other dimensions: 147 m (482 ft) long, 17.5 m (57 ft) wide

Technical details
- Material: Limestone, conglomerate, terracotta

The Middle Stoa (Greek: Μέση Στοά, Mése Stoá) was a portico or stoa in the Agora of Athens. It divided the ancient square into two unequal areas: a larger northern area and a smaller southern area. Situated at the northern foot of the Acropolis, the building ran east–west, south of the Eridanos River.

== History ==
During the 2nd century BC, new buildings formed the South Square of the Agora. The Middle Stoa was built first, followed by the East Building and South Stoa II. The complex replaced South Stoa I and incorporated the older Aiakeion and Southwest Fountain House. The Stoa of Attalos, built on the eastern side of the Agora, continued the enclosure of the square with porticoes. The Middle Stoa remained in use during the Roman period.

=== Dating ===
The construction fill contained approximately 1,500 stamped amphora handles. Virginia Grace used these stamps to date the latest material in the fill to about 183 BC. Her analysis combined the chronology of Rhodian and Knidian stamps with a proposed end date for the Sinopean stamps. She associated the latter with the capture of Sinope by Pharnaces I of Pontus. The excavators' short guide gives a broader construction date of approximately 180–140 BC.

=== Patronage ===
The donor is unknown. Grace proposed Pharnaces I of Pontus, who had gained control of Sinope and Amisus, ports involved in the Black Sea grain trade. An Athenian decree found at Delos records payments that he had promised to Athens. Grace suggested that an initial payment around 183 BC could have funded the terracing, foundations and possibly the building itself.

The attribution has been questioned. Grace dated the decree to 160/159 BC, but its modern edition dates it to 196/5 BC. Another hypothesis, discussed by Marco Cavalieri, attributes the Middle Stoa, East Building and South Stoa II to the Attalids of Pergamon.

Researchers believe foreign architects were likely responsible for the building's design, as it presents construction elements that were unusual for Athenian architecture of that period.

== Description ==
The Middle Stoa was the largest building in the Athenian Agora, measuring 147 m (482 ft) long and 17.5 m (57 ft) wide. An outer colonnade surrounded all four sides. Screens may have joined the columns of the central row, dividing the interior lengthwise. The outer columns were Doric and the central columns Ionic. The building was constructed primarily of limestone, with a terracotta roof.

=== Architectural details ===
The building rested on a krepis, a stepped platform. Its slabs were laid with staggered joints, so that each rested on two slabs below. Marks on individual column drums show where a narrow parapet, or screen wall, ran between some of the columns. It enclosed the eastern end and probably the western end. Its height remains uncertain.

The metopes, panels in the Doric frieze, were made of marble. The sima, a gutter along the roof edge, was made of terracotta.

The architrave and frieze above the columns were decorated with paint. Fragments retaining their original color were found in the destruction debris.

== Function ==
The purpose of the Middle Stoa, like that of the other buildings in the South Square, is uncertain. A commercial use has been suggested. Grace proposed that it served as a municipal granary. She compared its long, narrow plan and partly enclosed colonnades with Hellenistic granaries and Roman warehouses. She also suggested that a raised wooden floor could have kept stored grain dry, although no part of such a floor survives. In her interpretation, a building associated with the grain trade would have suited Pharnaces as a donor.

== Surrounding buildings ==
The East Building linked the eastern ends of the Middle Stoa and South Stoa II. It measured about 40 m (130 ft) by 12 m (39 ft). Its eastern half contained a long hall with a floor of marble chips. Cuttings in stone slabs supported wooden furniture, possibly money changers' tables. Four rooms and a stairway occupied the western half, leading to the lower level of the South Square. South Stoa II extended westwards from the East Building, parallel to the Middle Stoa. It had a single Doric colonnade and a small fountain in its rear wall. The Aiakeion, a sanctuary of Aeacus, was incorporated into the western part of the complex.

=== Urban layout ===
Roland Étienne interpreted the arrangement of the buildings as evidence of a coordinated plan. The southern end of the Stoa of Attalos aligned with the central wall of the Middle Stoa.

== Remains ==
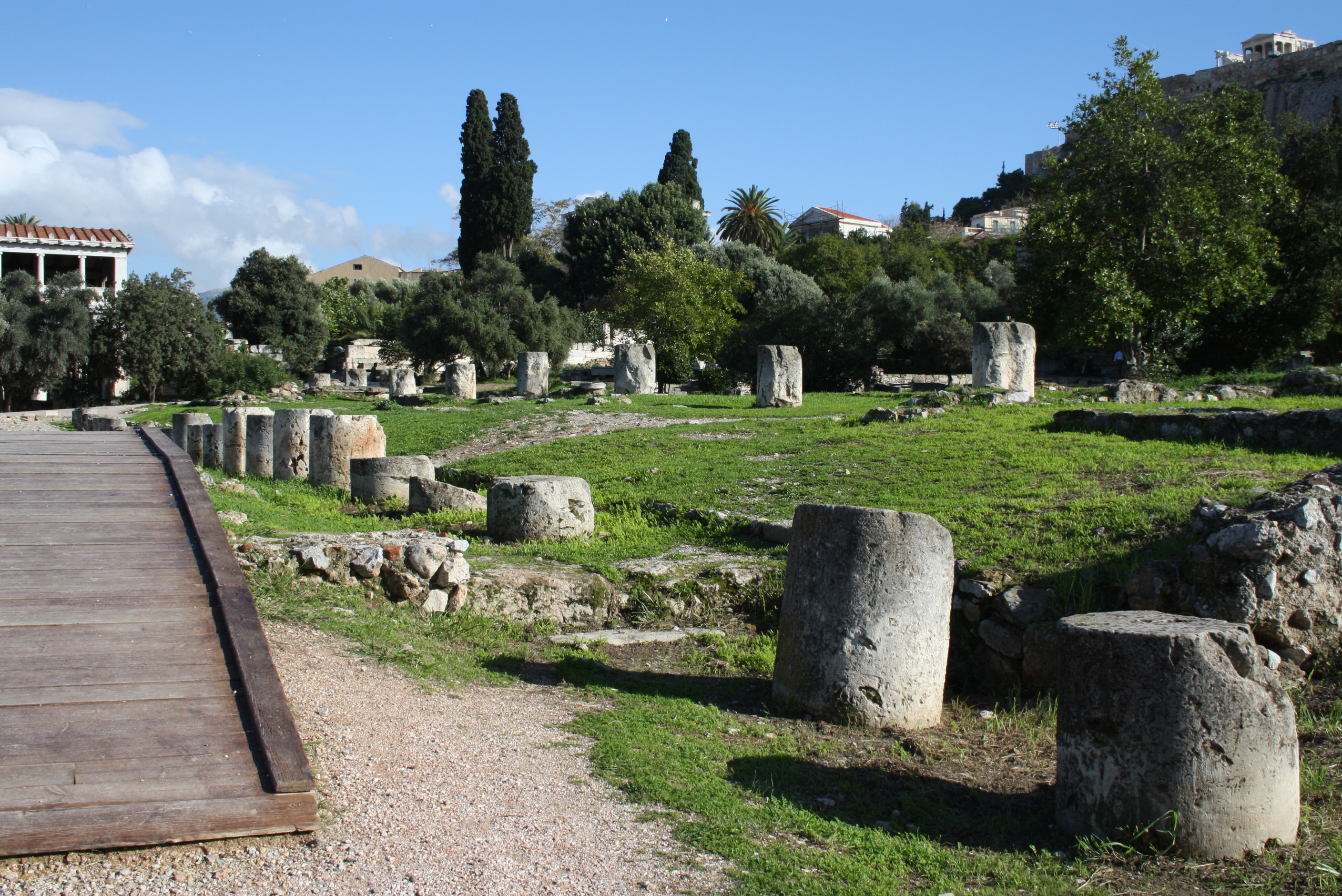
Ruins of the Middle Stoa at the archaeological site of the Agora of Athens.

Traces of the parapets are visible on column drums. At the eastern end, original steps and portions of three columns remain in place. At the western end, only the heavy foundations of reddish conglomerate survive. The excavated remains show signs of intense burning, indicating the superstructure contained significant wooden elements.
