= Ruth Wendell Washburn =

American educational psychologist

Ruth Wendell Washburn

Ruth Wendell Washburn (January 19, 1890 – July 1975) was an American educational psychologist. She received an A.B. from Vassar in 1913, an M.A. from Radcliffe in 1922, and a Ph.D. degree from Yale University in 1929. The Ruth Washburn Cooperative Nursery School in Colorado Springs, Colorado is named in her honor.

== Early life and education ==
On January 19, 1890, Washburn was born to Miriam and Phillip Washburn in Northampton, Massachusetts, although the family moved to Colorado Springs, Colorado, in 1893. She had two sisters, Miriam and Eleanor. In 1913, Washburn received her A.B. from Vassar College, and in 1922 she received her M.A. from Radcliffe College.

== Career ==
Washburn was at Yale University from 1923 to 1938: in 1923 she was an assistant professor at the Yale Clinic of Child Psychology; in 1929, she received her Ph.D. in educational psychology; from 1929 to 1934 she held a research associate position at the Yale Clinic of Child Psychology; from 1934 to 1938, she was an assistant professor of Child Development at Yale.

After leaving Yale, Washburn worked as a consultant in child development for Milton Prep School (1938–1971), the New Hampshire Children's Aid Society (1938–1955), and Shady Hill School in Cambridge (1943–1962).

Wendell was a member of the American Association for the Advancement of Science. She was a fellow of the American Psychological Association.

== Personal life ==
Ruth spent her life with the archaeologist Margaret "Missy" Crosby in Boston and Vermont. Upon Missy's death in 1972, Washburn moved back to Colorado Springs, where she died in July 1975.

== Selected works ==
The list below contains some of the publications authored by Washburn.

- The Smiling and Laughing of Infants, 1929.
- Children Have Their Reasons, 1942.
- Re-education in a Nursery Group: A Study in Clinical Psychology, 1944.
- Children Know Their Friends, 1949.
- Wisdom Begins at Birth, 1967.
