= Pinakion =

Ancient Greek voting token

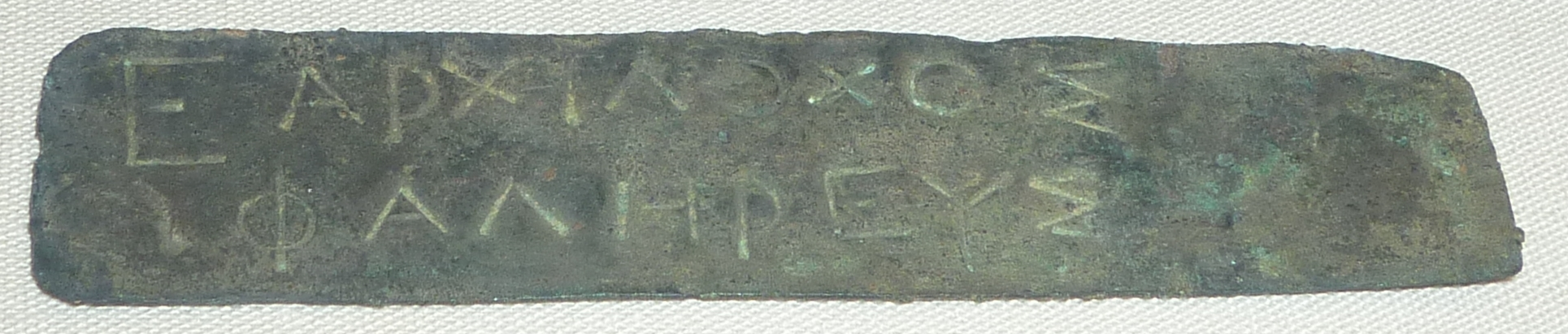
A bronze jury pinakion from about 370–362 BCE, reused after 350 BCE, held in the British Museum.

In ancient Greece, a pinakion (Ancient Greek: πινάκιον, pl. pinakia) was a small bronze or wooden plate used as a form of citizen's token. Pinakia for candidates for political office or for jury membership were designed to be inserted into randomization machines (kleroteria) so votes could be as accurate as possible to a wider community. Pinakia were common in Athens, but there are examples of non-Athenian pinakia as well.

== Origins ==
During the Golden Age of Athens, the use of pinakia developed from earlier forms of voting. These early methods included dropping pebbles in labelled vases and voting by raising hands. The first pinakia and secret vote in Athens were recorded in the mid-5th century BCE.

While wood was occasionally used, the best surviving pinakia are bronze. The use of bronze to create these Athenian ballots began c. 388 BCE and ended c. 322 BCE. The owner's name was engraved on line 1, and his deme was on line 2. The words and symbols were added by using the technique of punching.

== Sorting process ==
Pinakia were inscribed with a "section letter" that matched a column of slots on the kleroteria. After the votes were cast, a pre-selected group of jurors counted them and reported the results.

== Dikastic and nondikastic pinakia ==
The pinakion was a method of secret voting. They were labeled with names, but these were only seen and counted by a select group, of the general public. There were nondikastic and dikastic types of bronze pinakia. A dikastic pinakion had to be returned to the government after use, and the engravings were removed so the bronze could be reinscribed with the name of somebody else. A nondikastic pinakion could be kept as a valuable token throughout a person's life. Because of this, many pinakia are recovered from tombs.

== Bibliography ==
- Boegehold, Alan L. (1963). "Toward a Study of Athenian Voting Procedure". Hesperia: The Journal of the American School of Classical Studies at Athens. 32 (4): 366–374. doi:10.2307/147360. JSTOR 147360.
- Brooklyn Museum (2016-01-30). "Pinakion". Archived from the original on 2023-01-25.
- Liddel, Peter (2020). "Timodemides' Pinakion, Manchester Museum 42015" (PDF). Grammateion. 9: 77–80. Archived from the original (PDF) on 2023-06-06.
- Pietilä-Castrén, Leena (2016). "A Lost Pinakion Rediscovered". Hesperia: The Journal of the American School of Classical Studies at Athens. 85 (1): 201–205. doi:10.2972/hesperia.85.1.0201. JSTOR 10.2972/hesperia.85.1.020. S2CID 183914066.
