= Virginia Grace =

American archaeologist (1901–1994)

- Grace in Turkey during World War II
- Born: Virginia Randolph Grace; 1901; New York, New York, U.S.
- Died: May 22, 1994; Athens, Greece
- Scientific career
- Fields: Archaeology

Virginia Randolph Grace (1901–1994) was an American archaeologist, known for her lifelong work into amphoras and their stamped handles.

As a result of this work, amphoras and their stamped handles are now useful as a tool for closely dating archaeological contexts and serve as a primary indicator for tracing and understanding ancient trade in the Mediterranean.

Her research files are the foundation of an archive of stamped handles (totaling some 150,000 records) from across the ancient world and to which scholars continue to add.

== Personal life and education ==
Virginia Grace was born in 1901 in New York City to Lee Ashley and Virginia Fitz-Randolph Grace, a comfortably-off family with her father involved in importing cotton. She was one of six siblings, including the ancient Greek historian Emily Grace Kazakévich. She attended Brearley School.

She attended Bryn Mawr College, graduating in 1922, after which she taught English and mathematics to secondary-school students for several years. In 1927 she returned to Bryn Mawr interpolating her studies with a year at the American School of Classical Studies at Athens and earning her PhD in 1934, working with stamped amphora handles.

While at Bryn Mawr she became engaged to a fellow student, although they did not marry before his death (a few years before 1940). She died in Athens on 22 May 1994.

== Archaeological work ==
Grace's work has included excavating Pergamon, Halai and tombs at Lapithos in Cyprus, and a lifelong affiliation with the Agora Excavations, starting in 1932. In 1935, she worked on the Bryn Mawr Tarsus excavations. She was a visiting scholar at the Institute for Advanced Study at Princeton and received two Guggenheim Fellowships to advance her research, the first in 1938. She worked with the U.S. State Department, the O.S.S. Greek Affairs offices in Istanbul, İzmir, Cairo, and at Athens National Museum.

In 1989, she was awarded the Gold Medal of the Archaeological Institute of America.
