= Eugene Vanderpool =

American archaeologist (1906–1989)

- Born: August 3, 1906; Morristown, New Jersey, US
- Died: August 1, 1989 (aged 82); Athens, Greece
- Relatives: Miltiadis Evert (son-in-law); Angelos Evert (brother-in-law)

Academic background
- Education: Princeton University; American School of Classical Studies; Harvard University

Academic work
- Discipline: Archaeology
- Institutions: American School of Classical Studies

Eugene Vanderpool (August 3, 1906 – August 1, 1989) was an American archaeologist. He was a professor from 1947 to 1971 and a professor emeritus of classical archeology from 1971 to 1989 at the American School of Classical Studies in Athens.

== Life ==
Eugene Vanderpool was a son of Wynant Davis Vanderpool and his wife Cornelia Grinnell, née Willis. He studied Classics at the Princeton University and received a BA degree in 1929. He then traveled to Greece, where he continued his studies for a year at the American School of Classical Studies before going to the University of Illinois for a year in 1931 to teach classical studies. In 1932 he became an employee of the newly begun excavations at the Agora of Athens, under T. Leslie Shear; he became a deputy head of them in 1947 under Homer A. Thompson, a position he held until 1967.

His work was interrupted during World War II in 1941 when Vanderpool was one of the last Americans remaining in Greece and was imprisoned in the course of the German occupation of Greece. He spent his captivity in Laufen, Germany, where an internment camp was set up in the castle for some American civilians who were unable to leave Europe quickly enough due to the United States' entry into the war. During this time, he gave lectures on ancient Greek history as part of educational events organized by the prisoners themselves, which he based on a copy of Thucydides that was in his pocket when he was arrested. Book donations from British Red Cross and the YMCA enabled him to teach about Herodotus, Xenophon and Aristotle, among others.

As part of a prisoner swap, Vanderpool was released in 1944 and went to Princeton, New Jersey to the Institute for Advanced Study, where he conducted research until 1946. He returned to Greece this year as part of the United Nations Relief and Rehabilitation Administration. Fulbright scholar in 1948-1949. In 1949 he was appointed professor at the American School of Classical Studies and taught there as a full professor until 1971, after which he worked there as a professor emeritus until his death in 1989.The Eugene Vanderpool Fellowship was established in his honor in 1971/1972 that is intended for second-year students recommended by the Director of the American School.

== Research and teaching ==
Vanderpool's research and teaching covered the broad range of ancient literature and classical archaeology, including issues of Greek vase painting, Greek and Roman architecture, ancient sculpture and epigraphy. Between 1953 and 1965 he published regularly a News Letter from Greece in the American Journal of Archaeology, in which he summarised the results of recent research and excavations by the American School in Athens and Attica. His most important research, which he published in numerous articles, was on the topography and inscriptions of Athens and Attica. In particular, his research provided identification (that should be taken with some caution) of a building remnants southwest of the Agora as the state prison in which Socrates was imprisoned before his death.

His constant traveling and hiking through Greece made Vanderpool an intimate expert not only of the topography, but also of the plant and bird life of Greece. For his achievements he was awarded the Gold Medal of the Archaeological Institute of America in 1975. He was also a recipient of the Greek Order of the Phoenix, a member of the Archaeological Society of Athens and the German Archaeological Institute.

== Writings ==
A bibliography of Eugene Vanderpool (approximately 100 scientific articles) is compiled in: Studies in Attic Epigraphy, History, and Topography. Presented to Eugene Vanderpool (Hesperia. Supplement 19) American School of Classical Studies at Athens, Princeton, NJ, 1982, ISBN 9780876615195, pp. vii–xii.

== Sources ==
- Lucy Shoe Meritt: A History of the American School of Classical Studies, 1939-1980. American School of Classical Studies at Athens, Princeton, NJ, 1984, passim, esp. pp. 105 f.
- Eugene Vanderpool . In: Princeton Alumni Weekly, December 20, 1989.
- John McKenna. Camp: Eugene Vanderpool . In: American Journal of Archaeology. Volume 94, 1990, pp. 291–292.
- Eugene Vanderpool: The State Prison of Ancient Athens. In: Rodney S. Young, Keith DeVries (eds.): From Athens to Gordion. The papers of a memorial symposium for Rodney S. Young, held at the University Museum, the third of May, 1975. University of Pennsylvania, Philadelphia 1980, pp. 17–31; cf. for example Hans Rupprecht Goette, Jürgen Hammerstaedt : Ancient Athens. A literary city guide. Beck, Munich 2004, ISBN 3-406-51665-3, p. 166.
