= Kleroterion =

Ancient Greek randomization device

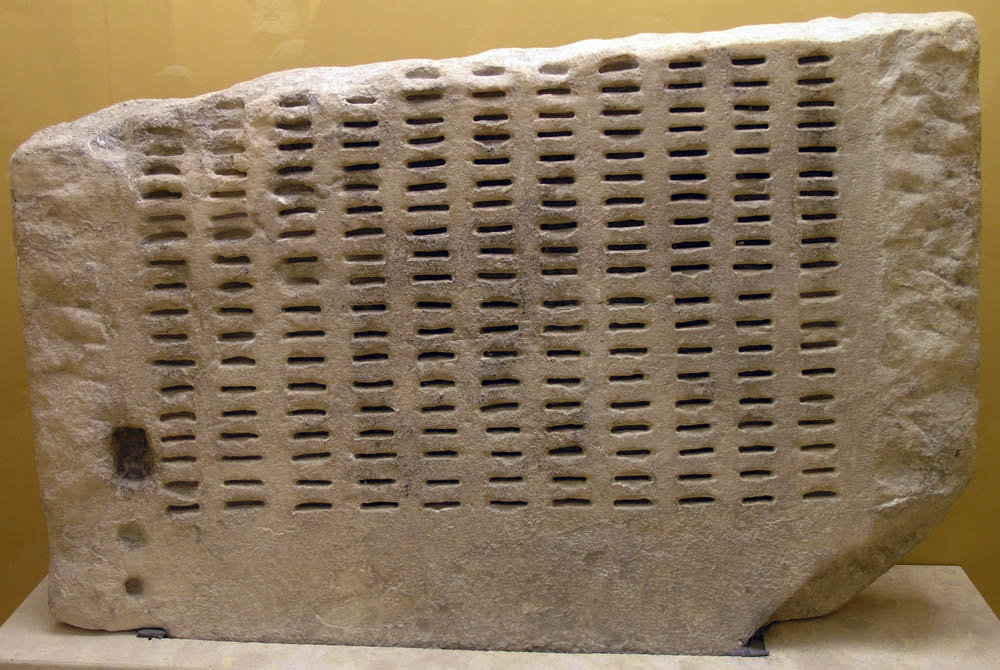
A kleroterion in the Ancient Agora Museum (Athens)

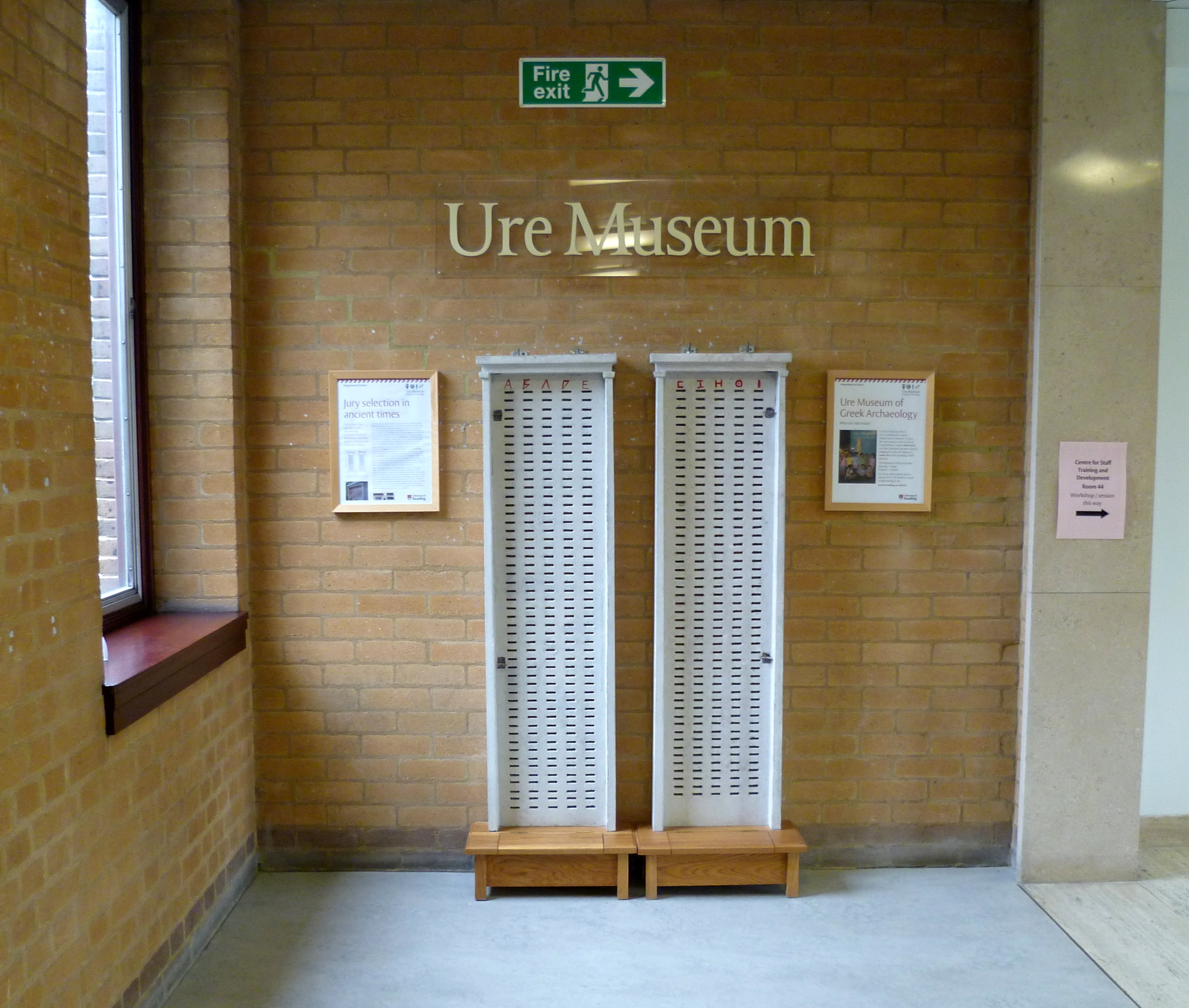
A large kleroterion at the Ure Museum of Greek Archaeology in Reading, Berkshire

A kleroterion (Ancient Greek: κληρωτήριον, romanized: klērōtērion) was a randomization device used by the Athenian polis during the period of democracy to select citizens to the boule, to most state offices, to the nomothetai, and to court juries.

The kleroterion was a slab of stone incised with rows of slots and with an attached tube. Citizens' tokens—pinakia—were placed randomly in the slots so that every member of each of the tribes of Athens had their tokens placed in the same column. There was a pipe attached to the stone which could then be fed dice that were coloured differently (assumed to be black and white) and could be released individually by a mechanism that has not survived to posterity (but is speculated to be by two nails; one used to block the open end and another to separate the next die to fall from the rest of the dice above it, like an airlock.) When a die was released, a complete row of tokens (so, one citizen from each of the tribes of Athens) was either selected if the die was coloured one colour, or discarded if it was the alternate color. This process continued until the requisite number of citizens was selected.

== History ==
Prior to 403 BC, the courts published a schedule and the number of dikastes required for the day. Those citizens who wanted to be dikastes queued at the entrance of the court at the beginning of the court day. Originally, the procedure was based on a "first come, first serve" basis. Beginning in 403 BC, Athenian allotment underwent a series of reforms, and from 370 BC onwards, they employed the kleroterion.

== Procedure ==
In his Constitution of the Athenians, Aristotle gives an account of the selection of jurors to the dikastra. Each deme divided their dikastes into ten sections, which split the use of two kleroteria. Candidate citizens placed their identification token (pinaka) in the section's chest. Once each citizen who wished to become judge for the day placed their pinaka in the chest, the presiding archon shook the chest and drew out tokens. The citizen whose token was first drawn became the token inserter (empektes) and also was automatically selected as a juror. The token inserter then pulled out tokens and inserted them into their corresponding sections. The kleroterion was divided into five columns, one column per tribe section (between two machines). Each row was known as a kanomides. Once the token inserter filled the kleroterion, the archon then placed a mix of black and white dice (kyboi) into the side of the kleroterion. The number of white dice was proportional to the number of jurors needed. The archon allowed the dice to fall through a tube on the side of the kleroterion and drew them one by one. If the die was white, the top row was selected as jurors. If the die was black, the archon moved on to the next row down from the top and repeated the process until all juror positions were filled for the day.

== Scholarship ==
The first significant examination of Athenian allotment procedures was James Wycliffe Headlam's Election by Lot, first published in 1891. Aristotle's Constitution of the Athenians, the text of which was first discovered in 1879 and first published as Aristotle's in 1890, became an important resource for scholars. Throughout the text, Aristotle makes references to a lottery system which was used to appoint government officials.

Archaeologists first discovered kleroteria in the 1930s in the Athenian Agora, dating them to the second century BC. In Aristotle, the Kleroteria, and the Courts (1939), Sterling Dow gave an overview and analysis of the discovered machines. Contrary to previous scholars, who translated kleroterion as "allotment room," Dow reasoned that kleroterion cannot be translated to mean "room," as Aristotle writes "εἰσὶ δὲ κανονίδες [πέντε ἐ]ν ἑκάστῳ τῶν κληρωτηρίων" ("There are five kanonides in each of the kleroteria"). Dow concluded that Aristotle's fourth-century description of the kleroterion also applied to the second-century kleroterion.

In 1937, Dow published a catalog of his archaeological discoveries in the Athenian agora. He lists eleven physical fragments of kleroteria:

Sterling Dow's kleroterion fragments
Fragment	Description
I	Most complete fragment, contains only one column of slots. Intact groove and inverted cone to place dice into
II	2 columns of slots, 7 intact in one column and 8 in the other. Significant overhang above
III	Traces indicate 4 columns, much larger cone
IV	Small fragment
V	Small fragment but significant because the grooves for slots were unusually long and angled.
VI	Multiple small fragments, presumed to be parts of much larger machine
VII	Small fragment
VIII	Small fragment, but can infer that it was part of a large kleroterion with nearly 300 slots
IX	Uneven holes and poor workmanship
X	Large and well preserved fragment, inferred to be about half of the original
XI	Largest section of the kleroteria, possibly with nearly 1000 slots

== See also ==
- Sortition
- Lottery machine
