= Margaret Crosby =

American Classical archaeologist

- Crosby at the excavation of the Dura-Europos synagogue, 1932–33
- Born: August 14, 1901; Minnesota, U.S.
- Died: July 30, 1972 (aged 70); Hanover, New Hampshire, U.S.
- Education: Bryn Mawr College; Yale University
- Occupations: Archaeologist, historian

Margaret Crosby (1901–1972) was an American archaeologist and historian. Crosby graduated from Bryn Mawr College in 1922, and subsequently became involved in archaeology and ancient history, especially epigraphy and metrology, earning her PhD at Yale University. During World War II, Crosby joined the Office of Strategic Services (OSS) and worked as a cryptographer for the OSS' Greek Desk, deciphering reports and materials for the Allied Forces.

== Early life and education ==
Margaret Crosby was born in Minnesota on August 14, 1901. Margaret's father John Crosby was a friend of US Secretary of State Henry L. Stimson.

== Archaeological career ==
=== Dura-Europos ===
After graduating Bryn Mawr, Crosby studied in Europe for two years before beginning graduate work at Yale University. Crosby joined the Yale dig at Dura-Europos, and was the first female archaeologist to work at the site. Unlike the male archaeologists at Dura-Europos, Crosby did not receive a salary and had to pay her own travel expenses.

=== Athenian Agora ===
Crosby supervised fieldwork at the Athenian Agora with the American School of Classical Studies at Athens from 1935 to 1939, and was present at every digging season in those years, although digging seasons often lasted as long as five months. Crosby published numerous works on inscriptions and other findings from the Agora.

== WWII and the OSS (1940-1945) ==
Crosby joined the Greek Desk of the Office of Strategic Services (OSS) during the Second World War. The Greek Desk of the OSS had been created by Rodney Young and was staffed by a large number of archaeologists. She primarily worked as a cryptographer, a skill which she developed while deciphering weathered Greek texts. She was a reports officer for the OSS in Cairo from June to November 1944, and accompanied Gerard Else when he led the move from Cairo to Caserta, where they could be better overseen by the Allied Forces Headquarters. She later moved to Athens with the Greek Desk in November 1944 and continued working there until May 1945.

== Return to the Athenian Agora (1946-1955) ==
After leaving the OSS at the end of the war, Crosby returned to supervise fieldwork at the Athenian Agora from 1946 to 1955, retiring in 1962.

== Later life ==
Crosby retired in 1962 and lived in Barnard, Vermont with her life partner, the child psychologist Ruth Wendell Washburn. She died on July 30, 1972, in a nursing home in Hanover, New Hampshire.
