= Homer Thompson =

Canadian classical archaeologist (1906–2000)

- Born: Homer Armstrong Thompson; September 7, 1906; Devlin, Ontario, Canada
- Died: May 7, 2000 (aged 93); Hightstown, New Jersey
- Spouse: Dorothy Burr (m. 1934)

Academic background
- Education: Chilliwack Senior Secondary School; University of British Columbia; University of Michigan

Academic work
- Discipline: Classical archaeology
- Institutions: University of Toronto; Institute for Advanced Study, Princeton

Homer Armstrong Thompson (September 7, 1906 – May 7, 2000) was a Canadian classical archaeologist who worked chiefly in Greece. As a fellow of the American School of Classical Studies at Athens he joined the excavations in the Athenian Agora at their inception in May 1931 and was their director from 1946 until 1967. He was married to a fellow archaeologist, Dorothy Burr Thompson.

== Early life and education ==
Thompson was born in Devlin, Ontario, Canada, as the second child of William and Gertrude Thompson. The younger years of his life were split between Lauderdale Farm in Rosedale and Chilliwack, British Columbia. Since Chilliwack Senior Secondary School was not easily accessible from the farm, he and his sister, Jean, boarded with Grace Baldwin and her family on Williams Street in Chilliwack. At school, he was influenced by his principal Harry Fraser, who taught and encouraged Thompson in his pursuit of Latin. Homer's father, who had also studied Classics before becoming a farmer, encouraged his son as well.

At the young age of 15, Thompson graduated from Chiliwack High School. He enrolled to study Classics at the University of British Columbia, as well as becoming a member of the track team, the business manager for Student Publications, and the president of the Classics Club. Thompson focused on Latin and earned his B.A. with honours in only three years. He stayed to continue his studies and in 1927 received his M.A. with first-class honours. At this time he was only 19 years old and became the youngest Classics professor in Canada. Thompson chose archaeology for his doctoral studies, and was awarded his Ph.D. by the University of Michigan after only two years' study.

== Life and career ==
Soon after completing his doctorate, Thompson was awarded a three-year fellowship of $4,500 by the American School of Classical Studies at Athens to assist on excavations. He was to work primarily at Corinth but also in the agora in Athens, both under T. Leslie Shear. After spending some time in working in Athens, he became passionate about the Athenian agora and the possible work to be done there; it would become the focus of his career.

While excavating in Athens in 1932, Homer met Dorothy Burr. At the time she was the only woman fellow working on the excavations in Athens. Dorothy's concentration of study revolved around excavating and publishing her finds on the Athenian gardens and terracotta figurines. Thompson called Dorothy "one of [his] more remarkable finds." She also was a Classics enthusiast and worked with him at the Institute for Advanced Study as well as in Athens. They married in 1934. Dorothy gave birth to twins, Hilary and Hope, in 1935, and another daughter, Pamela, in 1938. However, she pursued her career as well, unlike many women of the era. Excepting the war years, from 1933 to 1947 Homer and Dorothy spent the summers of every year in Athens and the remaining months teaching at the University of Toronto.

In 1947, the Thompsons moved on to the Institute for Advanced Study at Princeton.

Thompson received numerous awards during his long career. These included: Fellow of the American Academy of Arts and Sciences (1957), the Gold Medal for Distinguished Archaeological Achievement from the Archaeological Institute of America (1972), the Lucy Wharton Drexel Gold Medal of the University Museum at the University of Pennsylvania (1978), the Kenyon Medal for Classical Studies from the British Academy (1991), and the Thomas Jefferson Medal for Distinguished Achievement in the Humanities from the American Philosophical Society (1996), of which he was also a member.

Thompson died in Hightstown, New Jersey.

== Works ==
- Thompson, Homer A. (1934). "Two Centuries of Hellenistic Pottery". Hesperia. 3 (4): 311–476. JSTOR 146611. Reprinted in Thompson, Homer A.; Thompson, Dorothy B. (1987). Hellenistic Pottery and Terracottas. American School of Classical Studies at Athens.
- — (1940). The Tholos of Athens and Its Predecessors (PDF). Hesperia Supplement 4. American School of Classical Studies at Athens.
- — (1962). The Athenian Agora: A Guide to the Excavations and Museum (2nd ed.). American School of Classical Studies at Athens.

== Sources ==
- Diffendale D.P. (2014) Thompson, Homer. In: Smith C. (eds) Encyclopedia of Global Archaeology. Springer, New York, NY. https://doi.org/10.1007/978-1-4419-0465-2_933
- Dyson, Stephen L. and Daniel Graepler, "Thompson, Homer Armstrong" In Brill’s New Pauly Supplements I - Volume 6 : History of classical Scholarship - A Biographical Dictionary, 2013-12-04

== Necrology ==
- Rotroff, Susan I. "Homer Armstrong Thompson, 1906-2000." American Journal of Archaeology 105, no. 1 (2001): 99-100. Accessed April 5, 2021. http://www.jstor.org/stable/507328.
- McCredie, James R. "Homer Armstrong Thompson: 7 September 1906 · 7 May 2000." Proceedings of the American Philosophical Society 146, no. 4 (2002): 412–14. Accessed April 5, 2021. http://www.jstor.org/stable/1558316.
- Martin, Douglas "Homer Thompson Dies at 93; Led Excavation of the Agora" New York Times May 13, 2000 https://www.nytimes.com/2000/05/13/nyregion/homer-thompson-dies-at-93-led-excavation-of-the-agora.html
