= Sanctuary of Aphrodite Urania =

Temple in the Ancient Agora of Athens

Coordinates: 37.9760°N 23.7217°E

Plan of the Ancient Agora of Athens in the Roman Imperial period (ca. 150 AD); the sanctuary of Aphrodite Urania is the unnumbered structure to the west of the Stoa Poikile (no. 11).

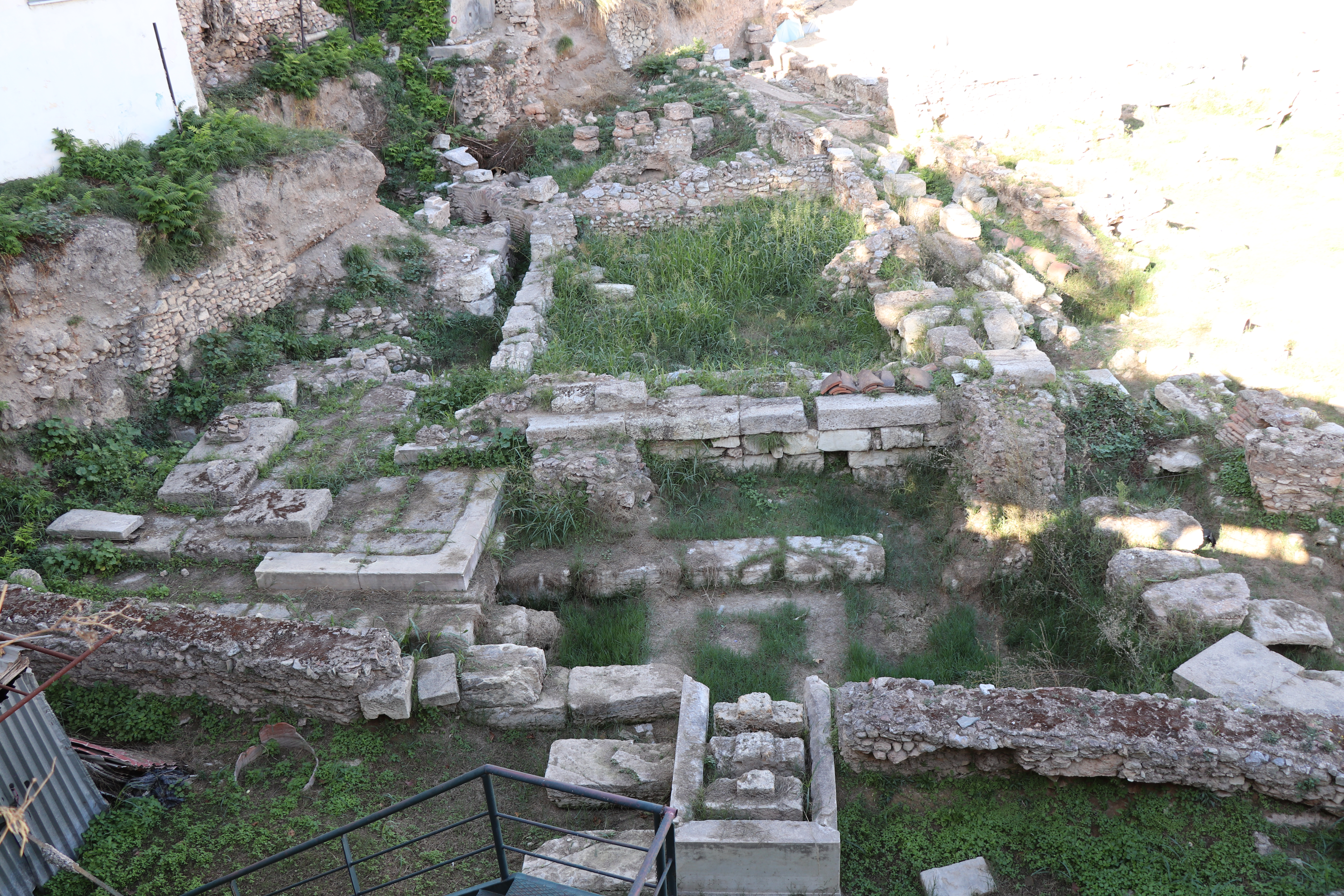
The sanctuary of Aphrodite Urania, seen from the south.

The Sanctuary of Aphrodite Urania (Ancient Greek: ἱερὸν Ἀφροδίτης Οὐρανίας, romanized: hieron Aphroditēs Ouranias) was located north-west of the Ancient Agora of Athens and dedicated to the goddess Aphrodite under her epithet Urania ("of the Heavens"). It has been identified with a sanctuary found in this area in the 1980s. This sanctuary initially consisted of a marble altar that was built around 500 BC and was gradually buried as the ground level rose. Another structure, perhaps a fountainhouse, was built to the west ca. 100 BC. In the early 1st century AD, an Ionic tetrastyle prostyle temple closely modelled on the Erechtheion's north porch, that was built to the north of the altar.

The temple fell into ruin by the early 5th century AD, when it was incorporated into a concrete platform, which was itself replaced by a Late Roman Stoa later in the first half of the 5th century AD. This structure fell into ruin in turn in the 6th or 7th centuries AD, after which the area was covered over by Byzantine housing. The identification of the remains with the sanctuary is based on literary testimony, a votive plaque found nearby, and analysis of the bone remains from sacrifices on the altar.

== Literary evidence ==
The sanctuary is known from the account of the 2nd century AD travel writer, Pausanias, who mentions it as his narrative moves from the Temple of Hephaestus on the Kolonos Agoraios (the hill west of the Agora) towards the Athenian Agora.

Nearby is a sanctuary of the Aphrodite Urania... Among the Athenians the cult was established by Aegeus, who thought that he was childless (he had, in fact, no children at the time) and that his sisters had suffered their misfortune because of the wrath of Aphrodite Urania. The statue still extant is of Parian marble and is the work of Phidias...

After this, Pausanias passes a bronze statue of Hermes Agoraios and then goes on to describe the Stoa Poikile.

== Archaeological evidence ==
The remains usually identified with the sanctuary are located at the northwestern corner of the Athenian Agora. An altar was built on the site around 500 BC. In the early Roman period, a temple was built to the north of this altar. The sanctuary had gone out of use by the fifth century AD, when the late Roman stoa was built across the area.

The east boundary of the sanctuary was formed by a narrow north-south street, which separated it from the Stoa Poikile. The south boundary was the Panathenaic Way. To the west, was a poros water channel in the Classical period and then the Early Roman Stoa, which ran along the Panathenaic Way in a northwesterly direction towards the Dipylon Gate. (Note: On the Early Roman Stoa, see Nikopoulou, Y. (1971). "Τοπογραφικὰ Ἀθηνῶν". Αρχαιολογικά Ανάλεκτα εξ Αθηνών. 4: 1–9.) There are traces of a polygonal wall about 6 metres north of the altar, which may have been the northern peribolos (fence surrounding the cemetery), or a retaining wall for a further section of sanctuary to the north.

The site is identified as the sanctuary of Aphrodite on the basis of the bone remains from the altar show that a large portion of the sacrifices were of doves, a bird that was only offered in sacrifices for Aphrodite. Moreover, a late fifth-century BC votive relief (Agora inv. S 3344) found nearby shows a veiled woman climbing down a ladder and holding out an incense burner - the iconography of Aphrodite Urania.

=== Early altar ===
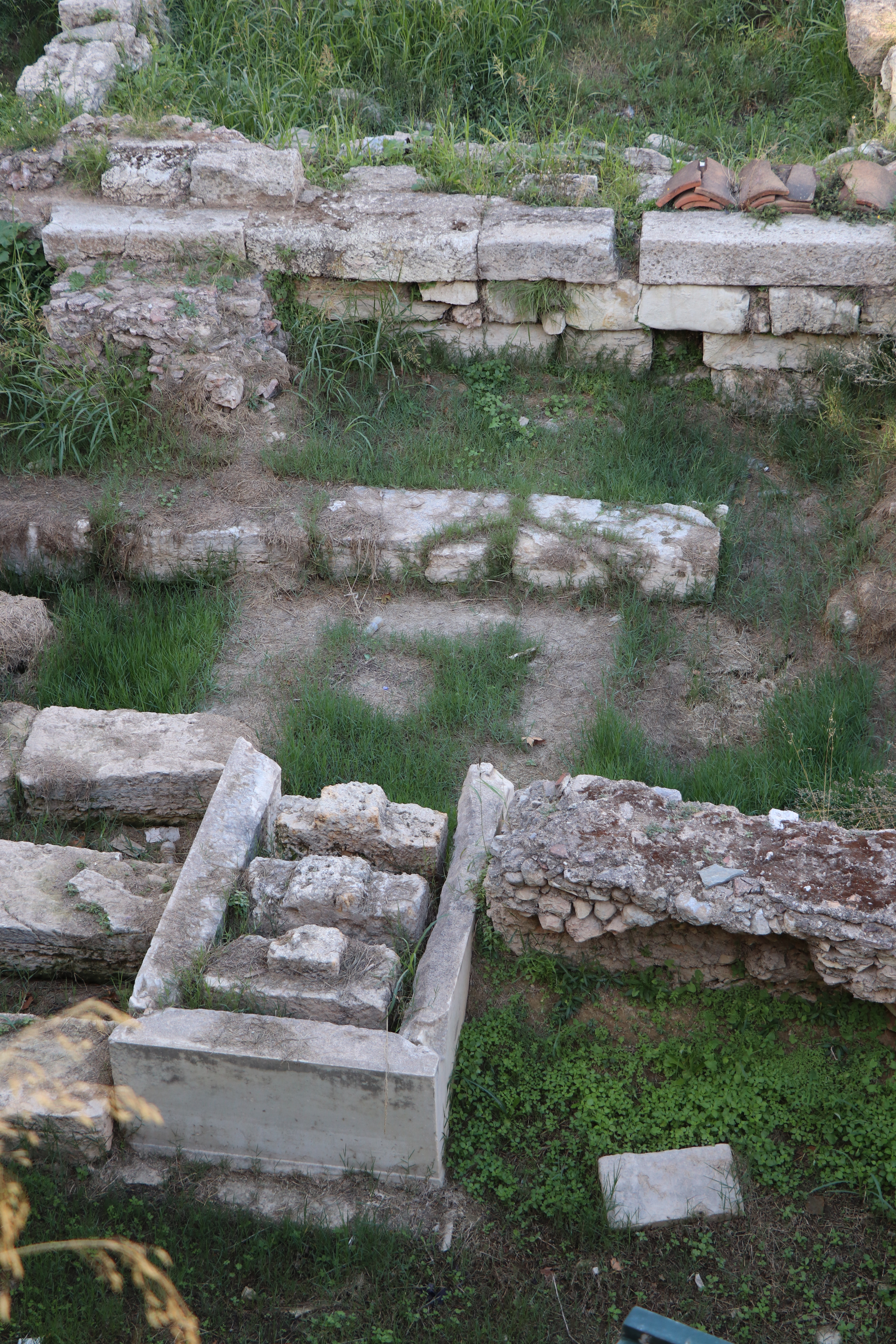
Altar of Aphrodite Urania, Athenia Agora, current state, seen from the south

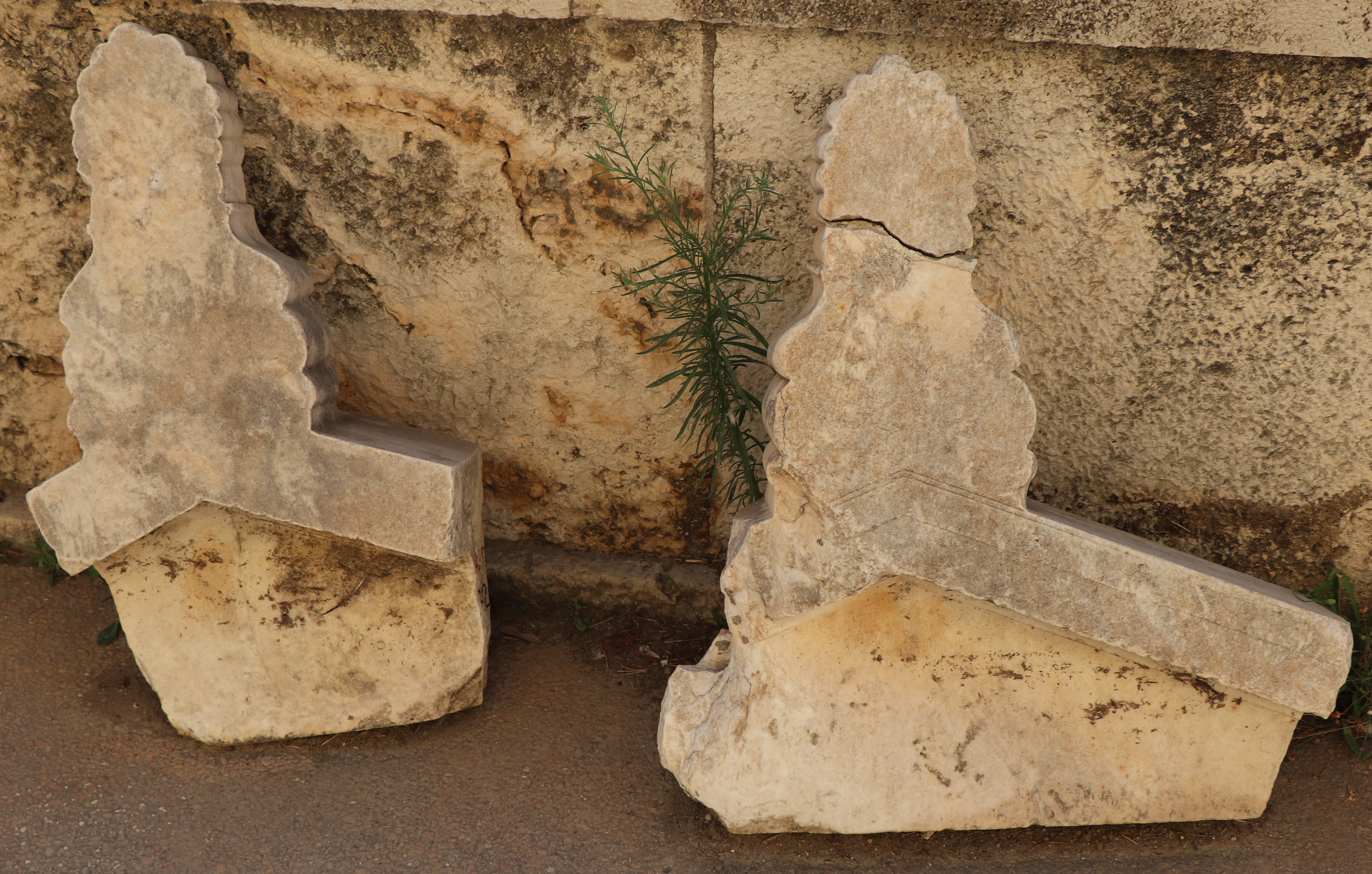
Marble barriers from the altar of Aphrodite Urania

The altar was 5.08 metres long and 2.40 metres wide and oriented north-south. It consisted of the superstructure of the altar and a "sill" of hard blue limestone 0.27 metres high. The foundation of the sill was a single course of poros blocks. The foundation of the base was a similar course of limestone blocks. The superstructure was offset to the east, so that there was a 0.58 metre wide space on the western side, where the priest would stand, in order to make sacrifices on the altar. The superstructure of the altar was 4.42 metres long and 1.585 metres wide. It consisted of six marble orthostates (the southern three survive) with a cyma reversa moulding at the base. Inside, there were seven yellow poros slabs (the southern three survive) which supported the marble upper surface of the altar (which does not survive). There were marble barriers at the northern and southern ends of the altar, each consisting of a triangular pediment topped by a palmette acroterion, which was originally painted. These were 0.717 metres high. The whole structure was thus about 1.7 metres high.

Pottery in the packing under the west side of the altar indicates that that altar was built around 500 BC. This is supported by the low ground level of the structure - 0.32 metres below that of the mid-fifth century BC Stoa Poikile. The ground level was raised to match the top of the sill a little before 480 BC. The upper part of the altar was heavily damaged, perhaps, during the Persian Sack of Athens in 480 BC. It was later restored - pottery and coins from the fill inside the altar suggest these repairs occurred in the 420s BC. By 400 BC the ground level had risen to 0.35 metres above the sill.

==== Sacrificial remains ====
Ash and bone from the sacrifices was deposited within the altar during the repairs in the 420s. A total of 80,364 bone fragments were found (12.6 kg), of which 1369 could be identified with a specific animal. Most showed evidence of burning. 1088 fragments (80.1%) came from goats, 264 (19.7%) from birds, and 7 (0.5%) from cows. The goat remains were mostly from kids, which averaged six to eight weeks old, meaning that they had been sacrificed in mid-April. 81% of the bird remains were from doves, 16.2% from chickens, and the rest were unidentifiable. Under a microscope, most of the unidentifiable bones appeared more likely to be bird than goat. The goat bones are predominantly from the back and pelvis (70%), with smaller proportions from the hind-limbs (25%) and even less from the fore limbs (4%). This is because only the inedible parts of the animal were burnt; the animal was decapitated before it was sacrificed and most of the flesh was eaten at the sacrifice. The forelimbs were often given to the priests as a perquisite.

=== Hellenistic building ===
To the west of the altar in the Classical period was a platform made of poros blocks with marble steps on the east and south sides measuring 7.00 metres from north to south and over 7.70 metres from east to west (the western end was not uncovered in excavations). It is possible that this was a fountain house similar to the Southwest and Southeast Fountain Houses in the Agora and the fountain house by the Dipylon Gate. Stratigraphy of the neighbouring Panathenaic Way suggests that it was built in the late second or early first centuries BC. The northeastern corner of this platform was covered over by the western edge of the porch of the early Roman temple. This structure was destroyed at the end of the fourth century AD, as shown by pottery and coins, probably as a result of Alaric's sack of Athens in 396 AD.

=== Early Roman temple ===
A temple was built 2.15 metres north of the altar in the early Roman period. It was a tetrastyle prostyle temple (i.e. it had four columns along the front and no columns on the sides or back) and faced due south, with the altar precisely aligned with its central axis. The porch of the temple was 10.08 metres wide and 3.80 metres deep. It was thus larger than the cella behind it, which was 8.20 metres wide and about 2.00 metres deep. The whole structure stood on top a podium 2.5 metres high. Only the foundations of the porch and the west wall of the cella survive. They are made of rough poros.

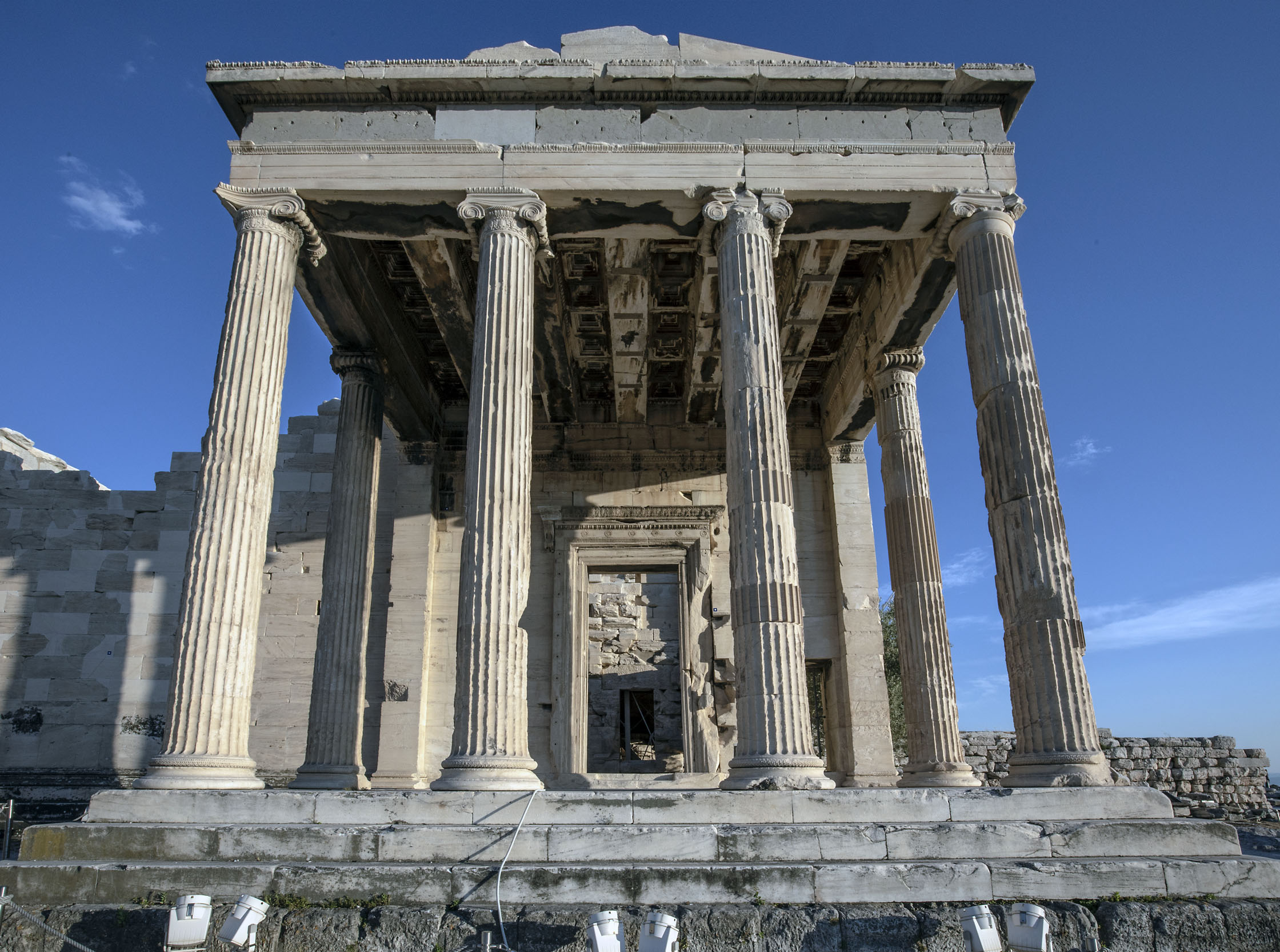
The north porch of the Erechtheion, model for the porch of the temple of Aphrodite Urania.

The frontal focus of the temple and its extra-wide porch are typical of temples of the Roman temples and are also seen in the Southwest and Southeast Temples in the Agora. The shallow cella is a particularly Roman feature, not otherwise paralleled in Athens. Two fragments from the superstructure were found nearby: the top of an Ionic column shaft with an anthemion moulding (inv. no A 4643) and an Ionic column base, which was later used as the foundation of a columnar monument on the Panathenaic Way. The columns were close imitations of those of the Erechtheion at 77% scale, with a diameter of 0.575 metres at top. Based on the overall dimensions of the porch, it is likely that the whole structure was modelled on the north porch of the Erechtheion. The columns of the Erechtheion were also imitated in the Temple of Roma and Augustus on the Acropolis, built ca. 19 BC, where the imitations were enabled by repair work then being undertaken on the Erechtheion itself. The temple of Aphrodite Urania is likely only a little later in date.

When the temple was built, the ground level in front of it was raised 1.37 metres above the original level and covered with a layer of cobbles. Ceramics in this layer of fill show that these earthworks (and the temple) date to the first half of the first century AD. During this levelling operation, five layers of poros blocks were carefully laid around the north and west sides of the altar, forming a rectangular platform which surrounded the altar and a new altar was placed on top of the platform. The physical contact between the altar, platform, and temple was believed to allow the sacred character of the original altar to extend to the new structures. A marble monument base was later added at the western edge of this platform.

At some point in the Imperial period a bath complex was built to the north of the temple, which included a marble latrine, built into the space to the west of the temple, abutting directly on its western wall. The cross-wall and east wall of the temple were demolished and rebuilt with rubble masonry atop a foundation of field stones early in the 3rd century AD. The new east wall was 0.50 metres west of the earlier wall.

The temple fell into ruins sometime before the beginning of the fifth century, when its remains were incorporated into a massive concrete platform. This foundation was 7.3 metres wide and continued south of the temple for 2.20 metres (covering up the space between the temple and the altar). It was demolished to make way for the Late Roman Stoa.

==== Earlier uses ====
Traces of a house were found under the porch and cella of the temple, which was occupied from the last quarter of the sixth century BC until at least the mid-second century BC. Underneath this were three graves of the eleventh century BC: a Sub-Mycenean amphora containing the cremated bones of a male teenager (inv. P 32307), a cist grave ("Grave J 2:10") containing the bones of a man, and another cist grave ("Grave J 2:11"), containing the bones of a teenage woman.

=== Late Roman stoa ===
In the first half of the fifth century AD, a stoa was built across the front of the temple, joining the Stoa Poikile to the Early Roman Stoa which ran northwest along the Panathenaic Way towards the Dipylon Gate. The front colonnade of this stoa, consisting of ten columns, ran from the front of the front of the Stoa Poikile to the front of the Early Roman Stoa. The side walls were shared with the neighbouring stoae. The back wall ran from the back corner of the Early Roman Stoa to the mid-point of the side wall of the Stoa Poikile, meaning that the west end was deeper than the east end (7.80 metres and 5.75 metres respectively). There was a door in the back wall which allowed continued access to the north-south street. It fell into ruin and was quarried for building material in the sixth or seventh century AD.

== Excavation history ==
In 1939, the American excavators of the Athenian Agora identified the sanctuary for Aphrodite Urania with remains of a building found on the north side of the Kolonos Agoraios, which were damaged by the Athens-Piraeus railway. This was disproven when the remains of the sanctuary were discovered by new American excavations in the northwestern corner of the Agora at 13 Hadrianou Street, which took place between 1980-1982 and 1989-1993 under the leadership of T. Leslie Shear, Jr.. The excavation of the sanctuary was supervised by John McK. Camp and Alison Adams Dickey in 1981, 1982, and 1990. by Camp alone in 1991, and by Julia L. Shear in 1993. Osanna and Robertson have questioned the identification of these remains with the sanctuary of Aphrodite, preferring to identify them with the statue of Hermes Agoraios mentioned by Pausanias right before he discusses the Stoa Poikile.

== Bibliography ==
- Wycherley, R. E. (1957). The Athenian Agora III: Literary and Epigraphical Testimonia. Princeton, NJ: American School of Classical Studies at Athens.
- Shear, T. Leslie (1984). "The Athenian Agora: Excavations of 1980-1982". Hesperia: The Journal of the American School of Classical Studies at Athens. 53 (1): 24–40. doi:10.2307/147938. ISSN 0018-098X.
- Edwards, Charles M. (1984). "Aphrodite on a Ladder". Hesperia: The Journal of the American School of Classical Studies at Athens. 53 (1): 59–72. doi:10.2307/147939. ISSN 0018-098X.
- Foster, Giraud V. (1984). "The Bones from the Altar West of the Painted Stoa". Hesperia: The Journal of the American School of Classical Studies at Athens. 53 (1): 73–82. doi:10.2307/147940. ISSN 0018-098X.
- Osanna, M. (1988–1989). "Il problema topografico del santuario di Afrodite Urania ad Atene". ASAtene. 66–67: 73–95.
- Shear, T. Leslie (1997). "The Athenian Agora: Excavations of 1989-1993". Hesperia: The Journal of the American School of Classical Studies at Athens. 66 (4): 495–548. doi:10.2307/148466. ISSN 0018-098X.
- Camp, John McK. (1999). "Excavations in the Athenian Agora 1996 and 1997". Hesperia: The Journal of the American School of Classical Studies at Athens. 68 (3): 255–283. doi:10.2307/148490. ISSN 0018-098X.
- Robertson, N. (2005). "Athenian Shrines of Aphrodite, and the Early Development of the City". In Greco, E. (ed.). Teseo e Romolo: Le origini di Atene e Roma a confronto. Atti del Convegno Internazionale di Studi, Scuola Archeologica Italiana di Atene, 30 giugno–1 luglio 2003. Athens. pp. 43–112.
- Lawton, Carol L. (2017). Athenian Agora XXXVIII: Votive Reliefs. Princeton, NJ: American School of Classical Studies at Athens. pp. 24–29.
