= Epizelus =

Athenian soldier from 5th century BCE

- Ἐπίζηλος
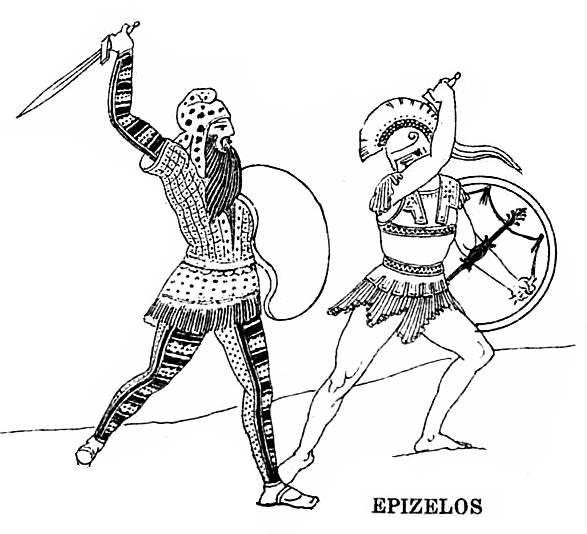
- Epizelos fighting a Persian at the Battle of Marathon, in the Stoa Poikile (reconstitution)
- Military career
- Allegiance: Athens
- Rank: Hoplite
- Conflicts: Battle of Marathon

Epizelus (Greek: Ἐπίζηλος), the son of Cuphagoras (Greek: Κουφάγoρας) was an Athenian soldier who fought at the Battle of Marathon in 490 BCE.

The only author to mention this individual is Herodotus in his Histories:

117. [1] ἐν ταύτῃ τῇ ἐν Μαραθῶνι μάχῃ ἀπέθανον τῶν βαρβάρων
κατὰ ἑξακισχιλίους καὶ τετρακοσίους ἄνδρας, Ἀθηναίων δὲ ἑκατὸν καὶ
ἐνενήκοντακαὶ δύο. ἔπεσον μὲν ἀμφοτέρων τοσοῦτοι.[2] συνήνεικε δὲ
αὐτόθι θῶμα γενέσθαι τοιόνδε, Ἀθηναῖον ἄνδρα Ἐπίζηλον τὸν
Κουφαγόρεω ἐν τῇ συστάσι μαχόμενόν τε καὶ ἄνδρα γινόμενον ἀγαθὸν
τῶν ὀμμάτων στερηθῆναι οὔτε πληγέντα οὐδὲν τοῦ σώματος οὔτε βληθέντα,
καὶ τὸ λοιπὸν τῆς ζόης διατελέειν ἀπὸ τούτου τοῦ χρόνου ἐόντα τυφλόν.
[3] λέγειν δὲ αὐτὸν περὶ οῦ πάθεος ἤκουσα τοιόνδε τινὰ λόγον, ἄνδρα
οἱ δοκέειν ὁπλίτην ἀντιστῆναι μέγαν,τοῦ τὸ γένειον τὴν ἀσπίδα πᾶσαν
σκιάζειν· τὸ δὲ φάσμα τοῦτο ἑωυτὸν μὲν παρεξελθεῖν,τὸν δὲ ἑωυτοῦ
παραστάτην ἀποκτεῖναι. ταῦτα μὲν δὴ Ἐπίζηλον ἐπυθόμην λέγειν.

117. In this fight at Marathon there were slain of the Barbarians
about six thousand four hundred men, and of the Athenians a hundred
and ninety and two. Such was the number which fell on both sides;
and it happened also that a marvel occurred there of this kind:
an Athenian, Epizelos the son of Cuphagoras, while fighting in the
close combat and proving himself a good man, was deprived of the sight
of his eyes, neither having received a blow in any part of his body
nor having been hit with a missile, and for the rest of his life from
this time he continued to be blind: and I was informed that he used
to tell about that which had happened to him a tale of this kind,
namely that it seemed to him that a tall man in full armour stood
against him, whose beard overshadowed his whole shield; and this
apparition passed him by, but killed his comrade who stood next
to him. Thus, as I was informed, Epizelos told the tale.

The description suggests that Epizelus suffered from hysterical blindness (referred to as a conversion disorder).
