= Stoa Poikile =

"Painted Porch" in ancient Athens

Coordinates: 37.9763°N 23.7230°E

Plan of the Agora at the end of the Classical Period (c. 300 BC); the Stoa Poikile is number 11.

Plan of the Ancient Agora of Athens in the Roman Imperial period (c. 150 AD).

The Stoa Poikile (Ancient Greek: ἡ ποικίλη στοά, hē poikílē stoá) or Painted Portico was a Doric stoa (a covered walkway or portico) erected around 460 BC on the north side of the Ancient Agora of Athens. It was one of the most famous sites in ancient Athens, owing its fame to the paintings and war-booty displayed within it and to its association with ancient Greek philosophy, especially Stoicism.

== History ==
The stoa is frequently mentioned in literary and epigraphical sources. It was built by one Peisianax, a brother-in-law of Kimon, in the 460s BC, and it was therefore originally known as the "Peisianactean Stoa" (ἡ Πεισιανάκτειος στοά, hē Peisianákteios stoá). Inside the stoa, there were a set of paintings on tablets, by Polygnotus (who painted his portion for free), Micon, and perhaps Panaenus (a younger relative of Phidias). The sources disagree on which painter produced which painting. Demosthenes, Aeschines, and other authors point to the painting of the Battle of Marathon as a key memorial of Athens' ancestral valour. Bronze shields captured from the Spartans at the Battle of Sphacteria in 425 BC and from the siege of Scione in 421 BC were set up in the stoa, where they could still be seen in the 2nd century AD.

According to Diogenes Laertius, the stoa was the site where the oligarchic government of the Thirty Tyrants "made away with" 1400 Athenian citizens in 403 BC. It is unclear whether this means that the stoa was where they sentenced them to death or where they were actually executed.

At the beginning of the Eleusinian Mysteries, the hierophant and the dadouch made an announcement that all non-initiates must keep out of the way. Sources from the mid-fourth century BC mention its use as a law court and as the venue for official arbitrations.

From the fourth century BC onwards, philosophers often taught in the stoa. The homeless Cynic philosopher Crates spent his time there. His student, Zeno of Citium, was particularly closely associated with the stoa, where he taught from around 300 BC until his death c. 262 BC. The philosophical school that he founded was named Stoicism as a result. The late third-century BC comedian Theognetus refers to "trifling arguments from the Poikile Stoa" in a joke about philosophers. Some philosophers spoke to their followers while walking up and down the stoa, but there were benches where people could sit and listen to lectures. There was also an area — probably the steps — where beggars customarily sat. The second century AD epistolographer Alciphron refers to "the unshod, cadaverous people who spend their time in the Poikile" and to "chattering philosophers making trouble there." Lucian presents philosophers teaching and debating there in several works. In the Imperial period, it was also a site of street entertainment; the second-century AD novelist Apuleius reports watching sword swallowers and gymnasts there.

A gate over the street to the west was added in the Hellenistic period, which was joined to the west side of the stoa. The stoa apparently survived the Herulian Sack of 267 AD intact. In a letter of 396 AD, Synesius mentions that the paintings had been removed by a Roman governor, apparently not long before. The building was still standing in the fifth century AD when the "late Roman stoa" was built to the west; this building rested against the Stoa Poikile's west wall. Debris over the remains suggest that it went out of use and was quarried for building material in the sixth century AD.

== Description ==
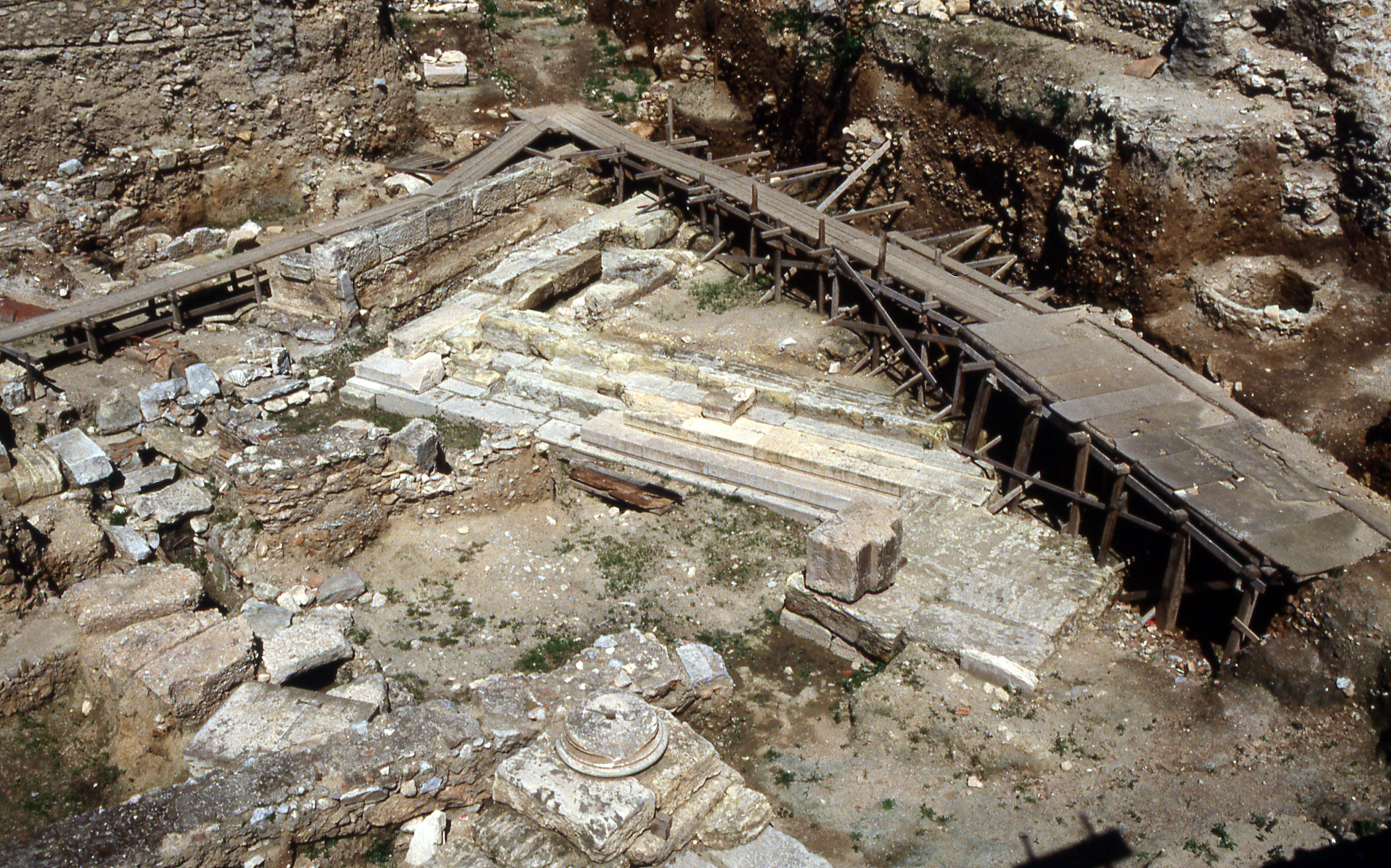
Ruins of the western end of the Stoa Poikile, seen from the southwest.

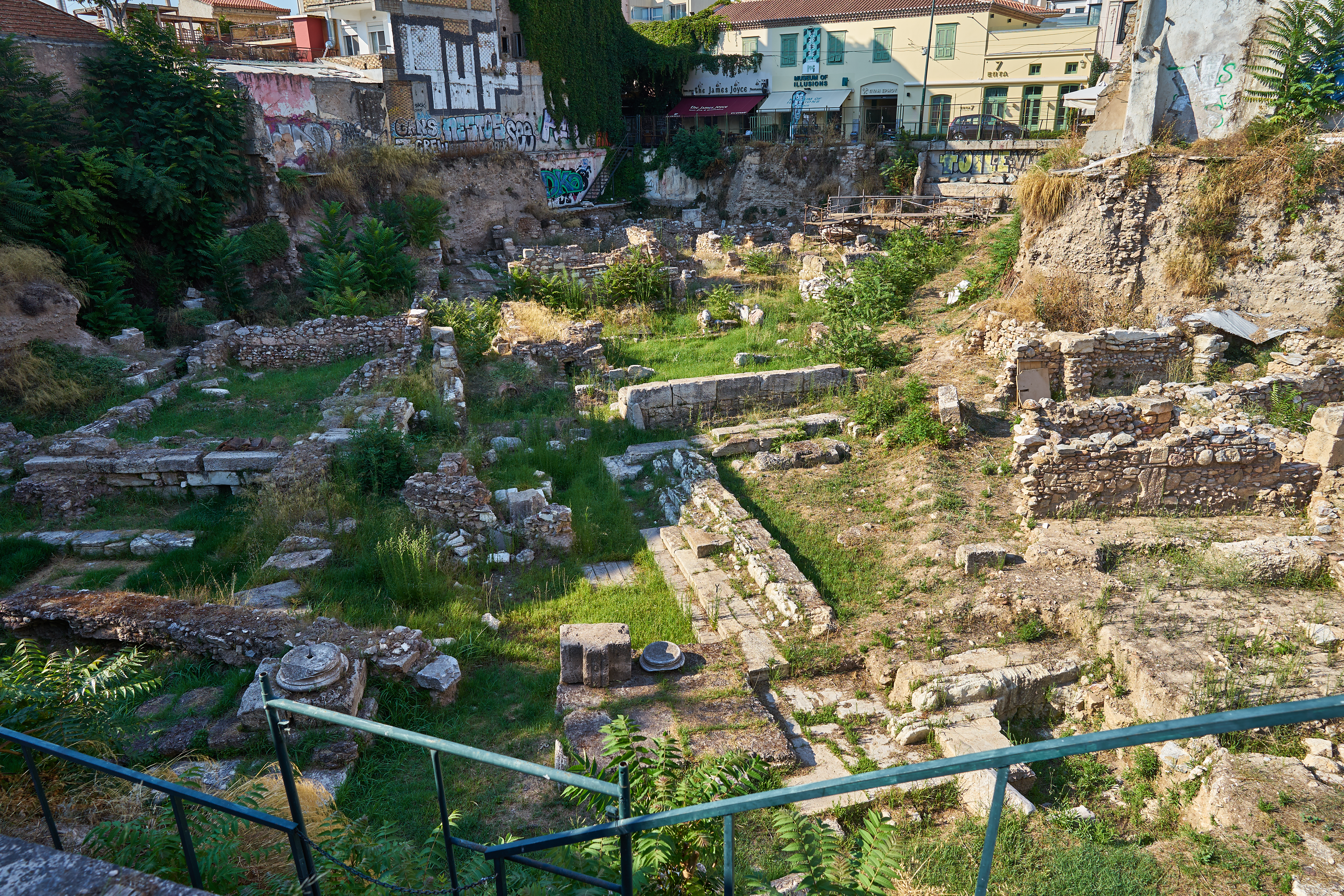
The excavated area of the northwest corner of the Agora, from the south. At right, the Stoa Poikile; in the lower foreground, the Hellenistic gate; at left, the Temple of Aphrodite Urania.

The stoa was located at the northwest corner of the Agora, on the left (north) side of the Panathenaic Way as one entered the Agora. To the west was a narrow north–south street. On the other side of that street was an altar and (in the Roman period) a temple, probably dedicated to Aphrodite Urania. To the north was a Classical Commercial Building. To the south was the drain that conveyed the Eridanus. To the southwest, on the other side of the Panathenaic Way, were the Stoa Basileios, the Leokorion, and the Altar of the Twelve Gods. Another north–south street probably bounded the eastern edge of the stoa and somewhere further east was the Stoa of the Herms.

The stoa was oriented so that it extended from south-west to north-east. The northern (back) wall is 1.40 metres wide and has been uncovered for a length of 10.40 metres. The total length of the stoa is unknown, but at least 46 metres would be proportionate with the stoa's depth. It probably extended all or most of the way to the next north–south street, which enters the agora about 55 metres to the east. The west side-wall was 12.6 metres long and (at the level of the foundations) 2.68 metres thick. The foundation consisted of three steps of hard, fine-grained poros of very fine workmanship, joined very precisely with iron double-T clamps sealed in place with lead. The steps show substantial wear from use as seating. An upside-down kalos graffito indicates that the blocks were reused from some earlier context. The southern side of the stoa was the main façade. There were four steps and a Doric colonnade, with an intercolumniation of 1.998 metres. Above this was a triglyph frieze of poros, which was 0.718 metres high. The triglyphs were 0.384 metres wide; the metopes, which consisted of marble panels that slotted in between the triglyphs, were 0.615 metres wide. This frieze continued around the west and east sides of the stoa. Inside, there was an interior colonnade of narrow Ionic columns with poros shafts and marble capitals, which supported the ridge of the roof. (Note: The capitals are similar to those of the Temple of Athena at Sounion (later the Southeast Temple), but with a reduced fascia between the echinus and volutes and without a cyma reversa profile for the echinus: Shear 1984, pp. 11–12) This makes it the earliest known building at Athens to combine the Doric and Ionic orders. A set of rough poros blocks running along the inside of the back wall probably supported a bench running along the back wall.

The packing of the foundation consisted of poros chips and red earth which contained numerous sherds of pottery that date almost exclusively to the 460s BC, indicating that this was the date of construction.

By the second century AD, bronze statues of Hermes Agoraeus, Solon, Seleucus, and others stood in front of the stoa.

=== Paintings ===
The stoa contained four famous paintings, which have not survived, but are mentioned by many authors, particularly the 2nd-century AD travel writer Pausanias. These paintings were probably on wooden boards on the back wall of the stoa and depicted:

- A Battle at Oenoe,which is otherwise unknown, but perhaps took place during the First Peloponnesian War (author unknown);
- The Amazonomachy, attributed to Micon or Panaenus by different sources;
- The Sack of Troy and trial of Ajax the Lesser, by Polygnotus;
- The Battle of Marathon, by far the most frequently mentioned, which different sources attribute to Micon, Polygnotus, or Panaenus.

A scholiast states that the stoa contained "many paintings", and other paintings are mentioned by various authors, including a painting by Apollodorus or Pamphilus of the Heracleidae and Alcmene supplicating the Athenians for protection from Eurystheus, a picture of the tragedian Sophocles playing the lyre, and a battle at Phlius.

The set of paintings sharply juxtaposes mythical and historical events, so that the mythical victories of Theseus over the Amazons and of the Greeks over Troy contrast with the (presumably) historic battle of Oenoe, apparently the first important Athenian victory over Sparta, and the Athenian victory over the Persians at Marathon. This contrast is a theme in the art and literature of Athens from the fifth century BC onwards.

==== Battle of Marathon ====
The painting of the Battle of Marathon displayed the confidence and identity of the Athenians in the wake of the Persian Wars. Of this painting Pausanias says:

At the end of the painting are those who fought at Marathon; the Boeotians of Plataea and the Attic contingent are coming to blows with the foreigners. In this place neither side has the better, but the center of the fighting shows the foreigners in flight and pushing one another into the morass, while at the end of the painting are the Phoenician ships, and the Greeks killing the foreigners who are scrambling into them. Here is also a portrait of the hero Marathon, after whom the plain is named, of Theseus represented as coming up from the under-world, of Athena and of Heracles. The Marathonians, according to their own account, were the first to regard Heracles as a god. Of the fighters the most conspicuous figures in the painting are Callimachus, who had been elected commander-in-chief by the Athenians, Miltiades, one of the generals, and a hero called Echetlus, of whom I shall make mention later.

— Pausanias 1.15.3.

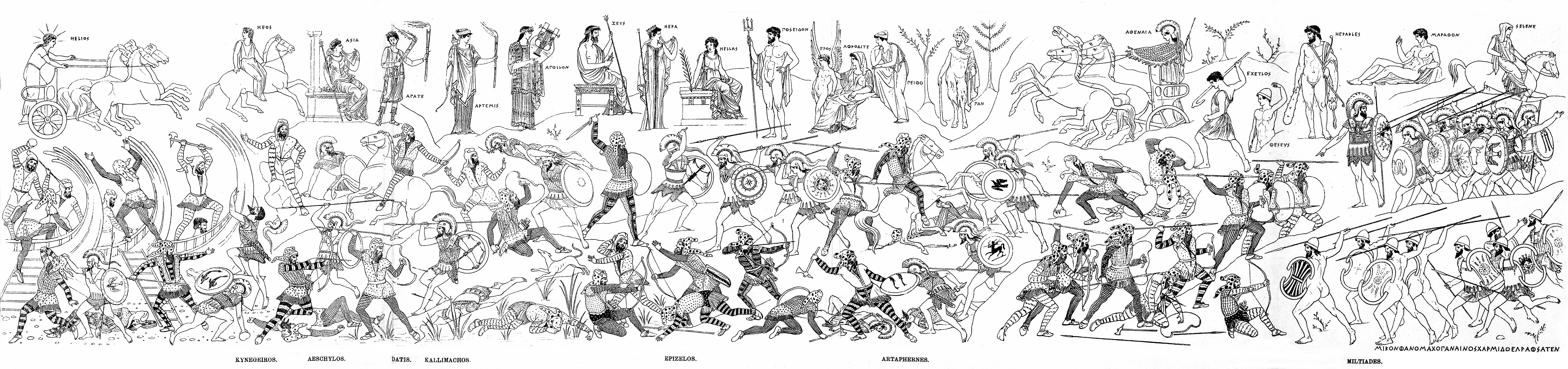
Reconstruction of the painting of the Battle of Marathon in the Stoa Poikile, after Carl Robert, Hallisches Winckelmannsprogramm (1895).

=== Hellenistic gate ===
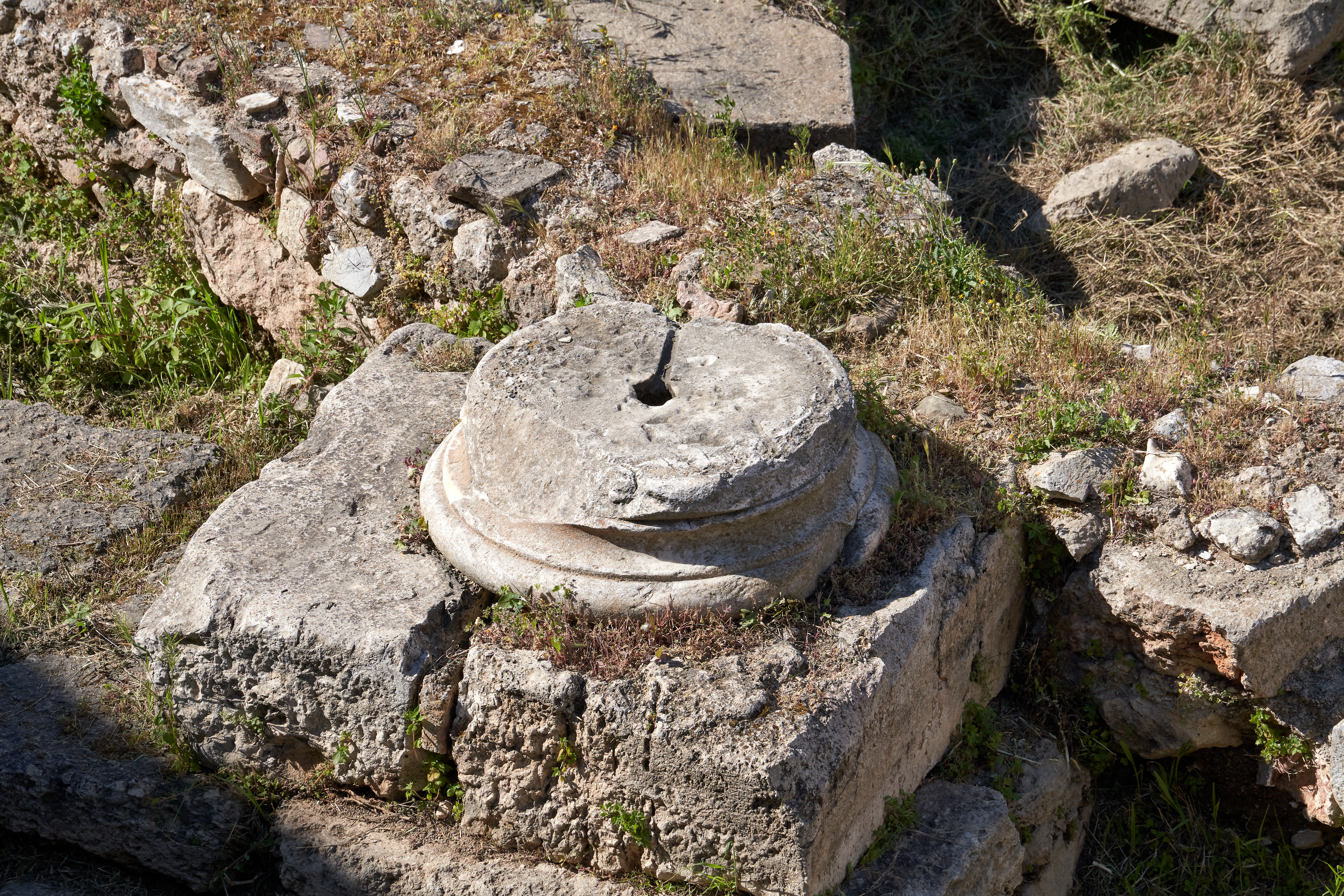
Late Roman column base on top of the west pier of the Hellenistic gate

In the Hellenistic period a gate was built over the north–south street, which abutted on the stoa's west wall and aligned perfectly with its front anta. The foundations of this gate are formed of poros blocks and consist of two large piers, with a 2.5 metre gap of hard-packed gravel for traffic. Only two blocks from the superstructure (a higher quality poros) survive. It is not possible to reconstruct its appearance, but it must have been a large and "imposing" structure. Pottery found in the packing of the road ranges from 325 BC to a little after 300 BC, indicating that it was constructed around 300 BC. The conglomerate foundations of a monument base stand in front of the west pier.

This gate is mentioned by Pausanias, who says that it had a trophy on top commemorating the Athenian cavalry victory over Pleistarchus.

The structure was demolished before or during the construction of the Late Roman Stoa in the 5th century AD. The west pier was then used as the base for a columnar monument; the Ionic base is still in situ on top of it.

== Excavations ==
The stoa was uncovered as part of the Agora excavations undertaken by the American School of Classical Studies. In 1949, Homer A. Thompson found a set of architectural fragments of a stoa that had been reused in a Late Antique wall to the west of the Stoa of Attalos. These consisted of a Doric entablature and Ionic interior columns of mid-fifth century BC date. In 1970 Lucy Shoe Meritt identified these as fragments of the Stoa Poikile. The foundations of the stoa were discovered during new American excavations in the northwestern corner of the Agora at 13 Hadrianou Street, which took place between 1980 and 1982 under the leadership of T. Leslie Shear, Jr.. The excavation of the stoa was supervised by Ione Mylonas Shear and Margaret Miles in 1981 and by John McK. Camp in 1982. Only the western corner of the stoa was excavated. This discovery disproved Shoe Meritt's theory, since the measurements of the foundations do not match the architectural fragments from the Late Antique wall. Architectural fragments that do fit the foundations were found scattered around the northwest corner of the Agora.

== Bibliography ==
- Thompson, Homer A. (1950). "Excavations in the Athenian Agora: 1949". Hesperia: The Journal of the American School of Classical Studies at Athens. 19 (4): 313–337. doi:10.2307/146840. ISSN 0018-098X. JSTOR 146840.
- Wycherley, R. E. (1957). The Athenian Agora III: Literary and Epigraphical Testimonia. Princeton, NJ: American School of Classical Studies at Athens.
- Jeffery, L. H. (1965). "The Battle of Oinoe in the Stoa Poikile: A Problem in Greek Art and History". The Annual of the British School at Athens. 60: 41–57. doi:10.1017/S0068245400013861. ISSN 0068-2454. JSTOR 30103146.
- Shoe Meritt, Lucy (1970). "The Stoa Poikile". Hesperia. 39 (4): 233–264. doi:10.2307/147646. JSTOR 147646.
- Davies, John Kenyon (1971). Athenian Propertied Families, 600-300 B.C. Clarendon Press. ISBN 978-0-19-814273-7.
- Harrison, Evelyn B. (1972). "The South Frieze of the Nike Temple and the Marathon Painting in the Painted Stoa". American Journal of Archaeology. 76 (4): 353–378. doi:10.2307/502871. ISSN 0002-9114. JSTOR 502871.
- Massaro, Vin (1978). "Herodotos' Account of the Battle of Marathon and the Picture in the Stoa Poikile". L'Antiquité Classique. 47 (2): 458–475. doi:10.3406/antiq.1978.3625. ISSN 0770-2817. JSTOR 41651323.
- Shear, T. Leslie (1984). "The Athenian Agora: Excavations of 1980-1982". Hesperia: The Journal of the American School of Classical Studies at Athens. 53 (1): 5–19. doi:10.2307/147938. ISSN 0018-098X. JSTOR 147938.
- Francis, E. D.; Vickers, Michael (1985). "The Oenoe Painting in the Stoa Poikile, and Herodotus' Account of Marathon". The Annual of the British School at Athens. 80: 99–113. doi:10.1017/S0068245400007516. ISSN 0068-2454. JSTOR 30102822.
- Francis, E. D.; Vickers, Michael (1985b). "The Marathon Epigram in the Stoa Poikile". Mnemosyne. 38 (3/4): 390–393. doi:10.1163/156852585X00546. ISSN 0026-7074. JSTOR 4431432.
- de Angelis, Francesco (1996). "La battaglia di Maratona nella Stoa poikile". ASNP. 1: 119–171.
- Camp, John McK. (1999). "Excavations in the Athenian Agora 1996 and 1997". Hesperia: The Journal of the American School of Classical Studies at Athens. 68 (3): 255–283. doi:10.2307/148490. ISSN 0018-098X. JSTOR 148490.
- Todini, Lellida (2008). "Παλαιά τε καὶ καινά. Erodoto e il ciclo figurativo della Stoà Poikile". Historia: Zeitschrift für Alte Geschichte. 57 (3): 255–262. doi:10.25162/historia-2008-0014. ISSN 0018-2311. JSTOR 25598434.
- Luginbill, Robert D. (2014). "The Battle of Oinoe, the Painting in the Stoa Poikile, and Thucydides' Silence". Historia: Zeitschrift für Alte Geschichte. 63 (3): 278–292. doi:10.25162/historia-2014-0015. ISSN 0018-2311. JSTOR 24432809.
