= Panaenus =

Panaenus (Ancient Greek: Πάναινος), brother or nephew of Phidias, was an ancient Greek painter who worked in conjunction with Polygnotus and Micon at Athens.

The painting of the Battle of Marathon in the Stoa Poikile is ascribed to Panaenus and to Micon and Polygnotus, who may have assisted him.

He also painted the marble sides of the throne of the statue of Zeus erected by Phidias at Olympia.

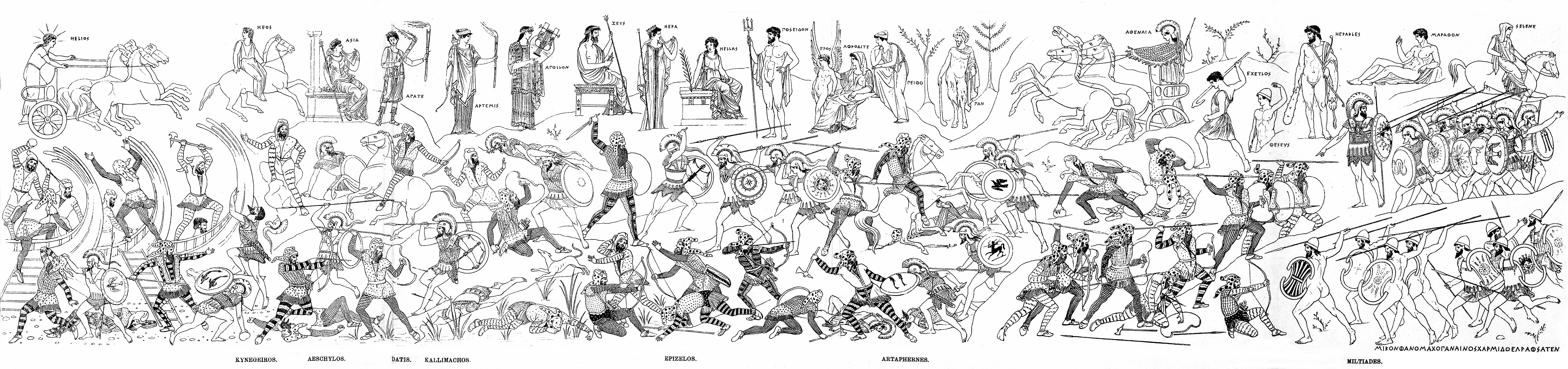
Depiction of the Battle of Marathon in the Stoa Poikile, by Panaenus (reconstitution)
