= Southwest Temple =

Coordinates: 37.9755°N 23.7228°E

Plan of the Ancient Agora of Athens in the Roman Imperial period. The Southwest Temple is number 35.

The Southwest Temple is the modern name for a tetrastyle prostyle Doric temple located in the southwest part of the Ancient Agora of Athens. Fragments from the temple found throughout the Agora enable a full, if tentative, reconstruction of the temple's appearance. These fragments originally belonged to several Hellenistic structures and a fifth-century BC stoa at Thorikos in southeastern Attica, but they were spoliated to build the temple in the Agora in the age of Augustus. It is unknown which god or hero the temple was dedicated to. It was spoliated to build the post-Herulian fortification wall after the Herulian sack of Athens in 267 AD.

== Description ==
The temple is located in the southwestern part of the Athenian Agora, to the west of the Odeon of Agrippa. To the south is a small stoa linked to the Civic Offices and then the Middle Stoa, with all of which it is aligned. It faces west, towards the Tholos.

=== Foundations ===
The foundations consisted of conglomerate blocks on top of a broken stone packing that was held together with low-quality lime mortar. They are poorly preserved; blocks remained in situ at the southwest corner only, but traces of cuttings indicate where the other walls were located. The orientation of the structure indicates that it post-dated the Odeon, which was built around 15 BC, and use of mortar in the foundations suggests an early Imperial date. Pottery fragments found in the foundations suggest a date under Augustus, in the early first century AD.

The structure consists of a cella without peripteral columns and a pronaos (porch) at the western end with four columns. The building was about 20.50 metres long (east-west) and about 10.48 metres wide (north-south). The porch was wider, measuring ca. 11.28 metres, because it included staircases on the sides as well as the front. The wall separating the pronaos from the cella was 4.20 metres from the western end of the building, meaning that it had the largest cella of any temple in the Agora.

=== Superstructure ===
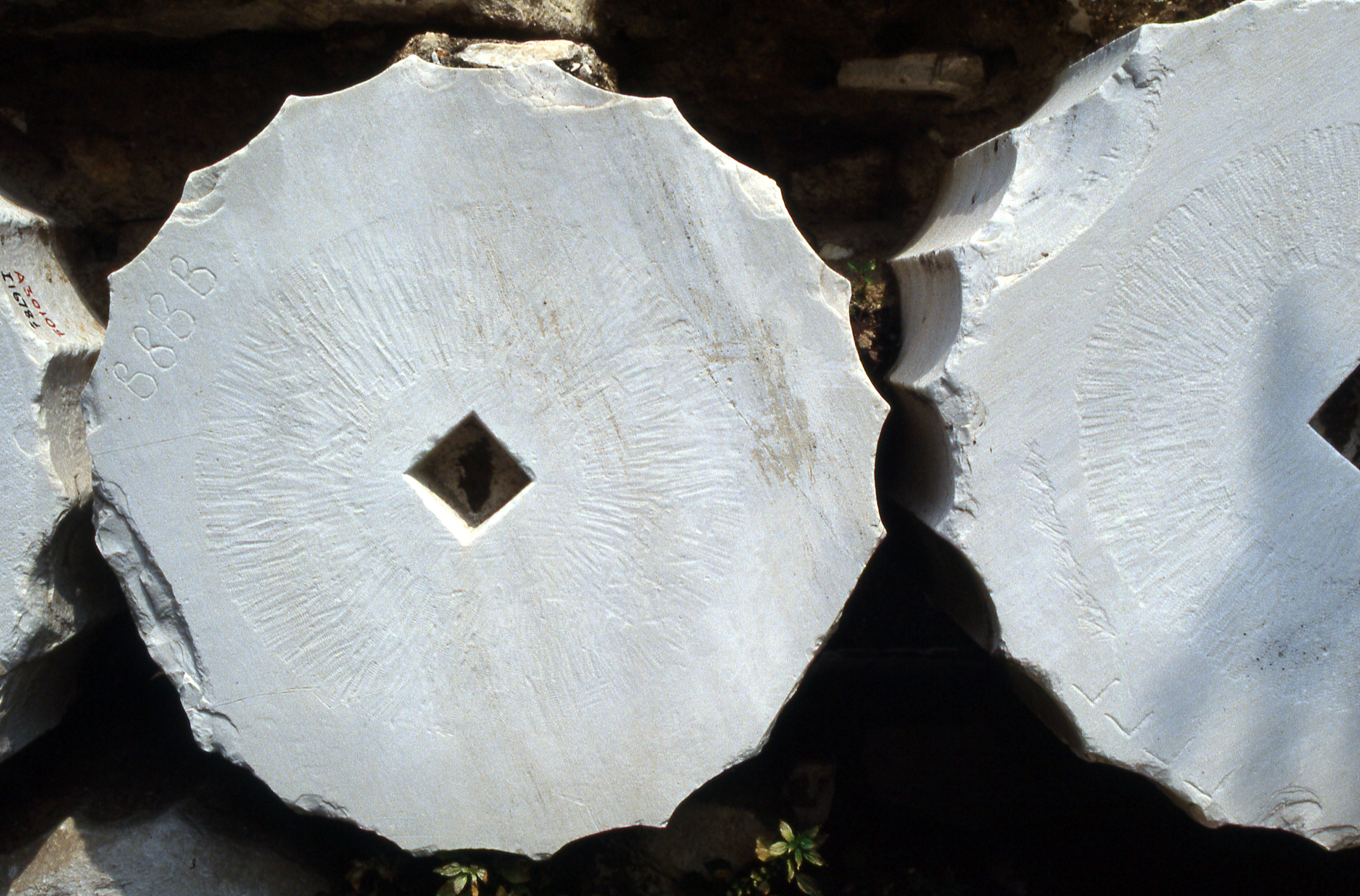
Column drum from the Southwest Temple, originally from the Classical "stoa" at Thorikos, in tertiary use in the post-Herulian Wall. Mason's marks to guide reassembly are visible at upper left and lower right.

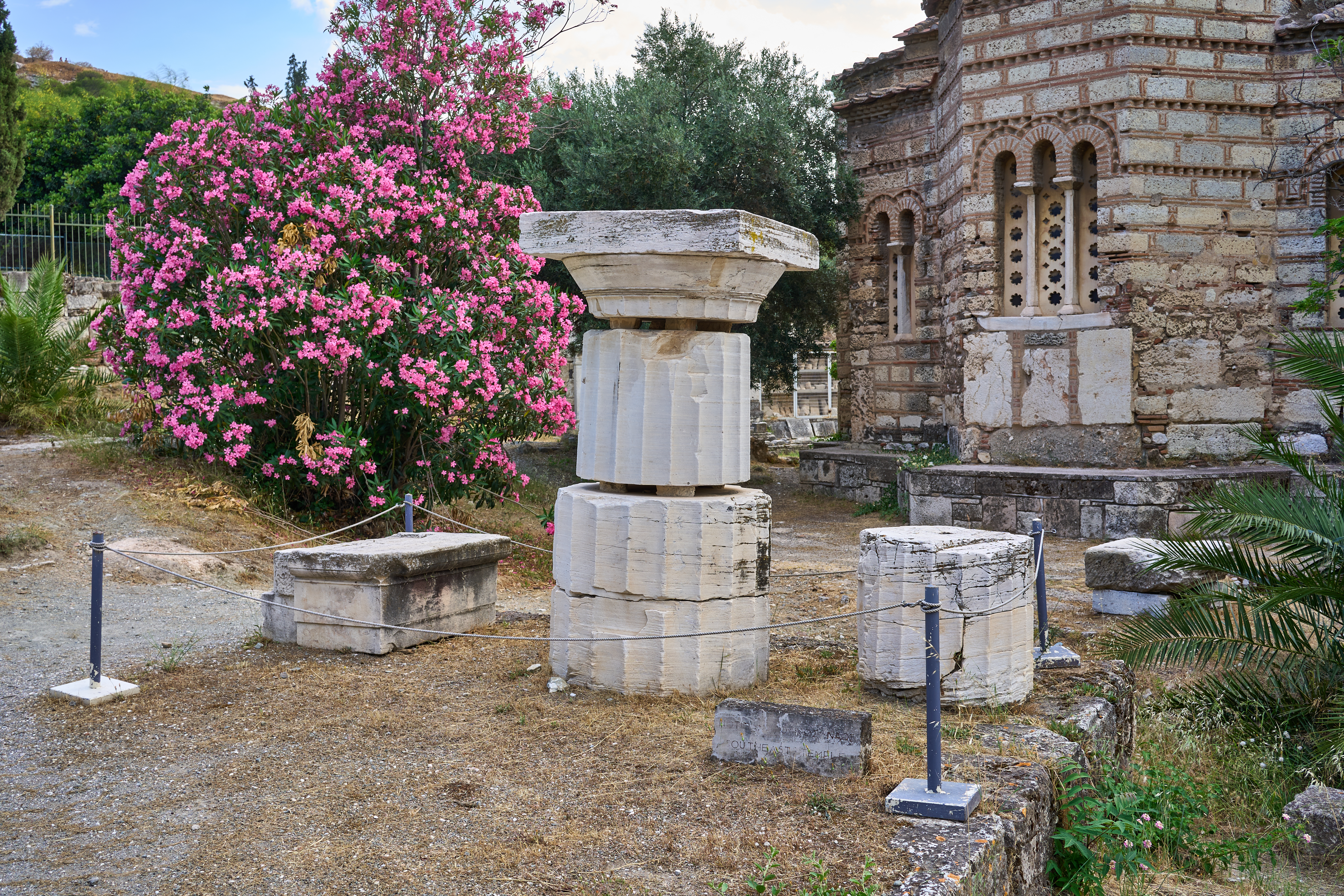
Column capital, drums, and (at left) anta capital from Southwest Temple.

No remains of the superstructure were found in situ, but a set of Doric architectural members found in the Post-Herulian wall fit the measurements of the foundations. (Note: Initially a set of Ionic fragments from the Temple of Athena at Sounion, which were found in the Post-Herulian wall, were connected with this temple: Thompson & Wycherley 1972, p. 166. However, the temple is too small for the number of columns that have been found:Dinsmoor 1982, p. 425. These fragments have since been assigned to the Southeast Temple: Dinsmoor 1982, p. 429.) These pieces are made of marble and include blocks from the entablature, triglyphs, metopes, drums and capitals for four columns, an anta capital, and blocks from the walls. These blocks were joined with hook clamps, which indicate that they were reused in the first or second centuries AD. Mason's marks carved on the blocks to facilitate reassembly of the fragments use letter forms which are characteristic of the same time period.

The columns come from an unfinished double stoa, built at Thorikos in southeastern Attica in the late fifth century BC. The fluting was added when the columns were brought to the Agora. The anta capital imitates the column capitals from Thorikos, but was newly made in the Roman period, specifically for this structure. The wall blocks come from a wall that ran down the centre of this double stoa at Thorikos. The fragments of the epistyle and frieze derive from a second century BC structure, which was probably destroyed during the Sullan Sack of Athens in 86 BC. The triglyphs were taken from four or more different temples, ranging in date from the Classical period to the late Hellenistic period. They were originally of different sizes, but were recut to fit the southwest temple. Other fragments were newly made in the Roman period

As reconstructed by William Dinsmoor Jr., the front of the temple consisted of four Doric columns with a diameter of 1.001 metres at the base and a height of 5.619 metres, arranged in prostyle (i.e. so that the outer two columns were directly in frant of the side walls). The intercolumniation of 2.976 metres between the centre columns and 2.75 metres between the other columns. There were no columns on the back or sides of the temple. Above the columns was an epistyle that was 0.766 metres high and 9.372 metres wide. Above that was a frieze of ten triglyphs and nine metopes, with an average height of 0.696 metres. The triglyphs and metopes continued on the sides until they reached the front of the cella.

=== Attribution ===
It is unclear whom the temple was dedicated to. Thompson suggested that it might have been dedicated to the Imperial cult, because a statue base for Livia as Artemis Boulaea and mother of Tiberius (Agora XVIII no. H254) was found nearby, but this probably came from the Bouleuterion. Dinsmoor suggested linking the temple with a statue of Athena found nearby (Agora inv. S 654), but this is now associated with the Temple of Ares.

== Excavation ==
The foundations in the Agora were uncovered in excavations undertaken by the American School of Classical Studies at Athens. Parts of the structure were detected during the 1933 and 1934 seasons, but it was only properly excavated in the 1951 season, under the supervision of Rebecca C. Wood. The remains of the superstructure were found during excavations of the Post-Herulian wall in 1939 and 1959.

== Bibliography ==
- Thompson, Homer A. (1952). "Excavations in the Athenian Agora: 1951". Hesperia: The Journal of the American School of Classical Studies at Athens. 21 (2): 90–91. doi:10.2307/146780. ISSN 0018-098X.
- Thompson, Homer A.; Wycherley, R. E. (1972). Athenian Agora XIV: The Agora of Athens: The History, Shape and Uses of an Ancient City Center. American School of Classical Studies at Athens. p. 165-166.
- Dinsmoor, William Bell (1982). "Anchoring Two Floating Temples". Hesperia: The Journal of the American School of Classical Studies at Athens. 51 (4): 410–452. doi:10.2307/147756. ISSN 0018-098X.
- Geagan, D. J. (2011). Athenian Agora XVIII: Inscripions: The Dedicatory Monuments. Princeton, NJ: The American School of Classical Studies at Athens.
- Miles, Margaret Melanie (2015). "The Vanishing Double Stoa at Thorikos and its Afterlives". In Miles, Margaret Melanie (ed.). Autopsy in Athens: recent archaeological research on Athens and Attica. Oxford: Oxbow books. pp. 163–180. ISBN 978-1-78297-856-5.
- Stewart, Andrew (2016). "The Borghese Ares Revisited: New Evidence from the Agora and a Reconstruction of the Augustan Cult Group in the Temple of Ares". Hesperia: The Journal of the American School of Classical Studies at Athens. 85 (3): 577–625. doi:10.2972/hesperia.85.3.0577. ISSN 0018-098X.
- Barletta, Barbara Ann; Dinsmoor, William B.; Thompson, Homer A. (2017). The sanctuary of Athena at Sounion. Princeton (N. J.): American School of Classical Studies at Athens. ISBN 978-0-87661-967-4.
