= Southeast Temple =

Coordinates: 37.9755°N 23.7228°E

Plan of the Ancient Agora of Athens in the Roman Imperial period. The Southeast Temple is number 39.

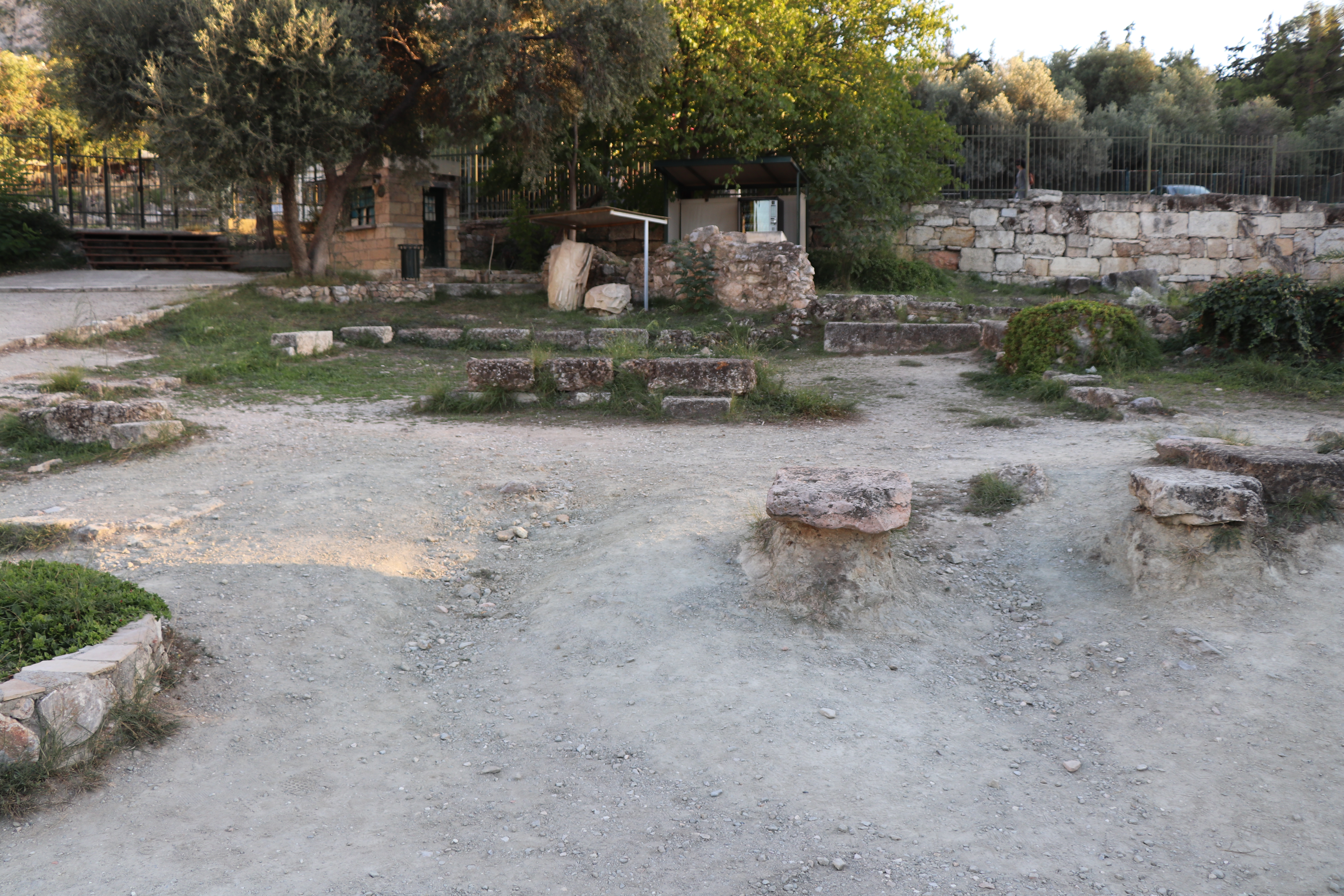
View of the remains of the Southeast Temple from the north

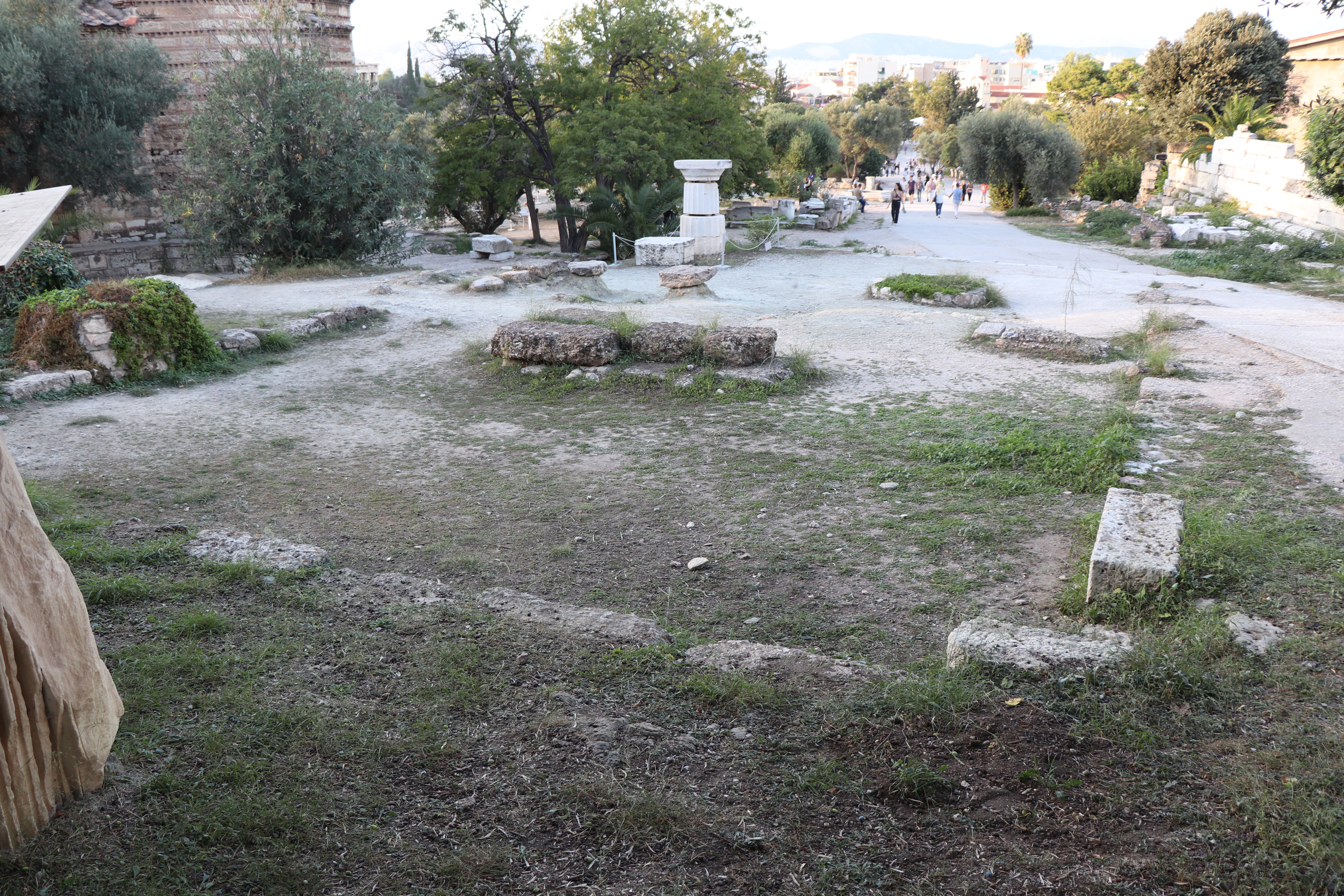
View of the Southeast Temple of the Athenian Agora, from the south

The Southeast Temple is the modern name for an Ionic octastyle prostyle temple located in the southeast corner of the Ancient Agora of Athens. Architectural fragments from the temple enable a full, if tentative, reconstruction of its appearance. These fragments originally belonged to the Temple of Athena at Sounion at the southern tip of Attica, but they were spoliated to build the temple in the Agora in the first half of the second century AD. It was thus the last of several "itinerant temples," relocated from the Attic countryside to the Athenian Agora in the Imperial period. It is unknown which god or hero it was dedicated to. It was heavily damaged during the Herulian Sack of Athens in 267 AD and then spoliated to build the post-Herulian fortification wall.

== Description ==
The temple is located in the southeastern corner of the Athenian Agora, at the foot of the Acropolis' north slope, on the west side of the Panathenaic Way, just past the Library of Pantainos. It was built on top of the northeast corner of the Classical mint. It would have dominated the view of people heading up the Panathenaic Way from the Agora towards the Acropolis.

In the mid-second century AD, a nymphaeum was built immediately to the west. The medieval Church of the Holy Apostles now stands to the west.

=== Foundations ===
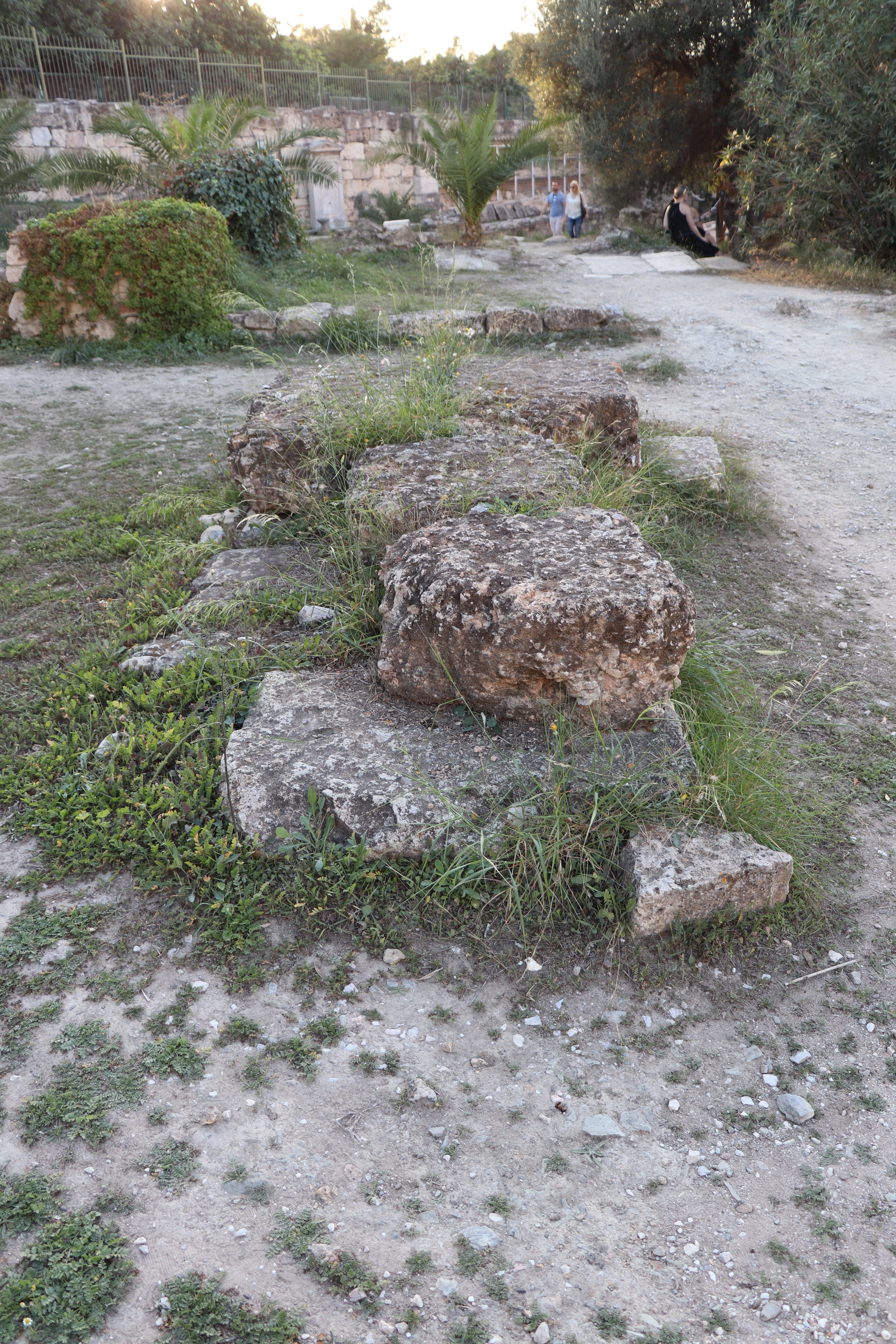
Pedestal for the cult statue, view from the east

The structure faced north-north-west and was 20.60 metres long. It consisted of pronaos (portico), which was 12.20 metres wide and 6.50 metres deep. Behind it was a cella, which was 11.20 metres wide and 14.10 metres long, with walls that are about 0.90 metres thick.

The foundation of the pronaos consisted of re-used conglomerate blocks set in trenches cut deep into the bedrock, which are 1.50-1.70 metres thick. The foundation of the cella is very limited. The walls sat in shallow irregular beddings. The lower parts of these walls survive; they are made of re-used poros blocks, sealed with low-quality gray mortar. Bedding blocks for a marble floor survive at the front of the cella; this floor probably continued into the pronaos. At the back of the cella, there is a partially preserved floor of packed clay.

Most of the space inside the cella was occupied by a large pedestal for the cult statue. This pedestal is located slightly south of the centre of the cella, which was 6.7 metres wide (east to west) and 4.40 metres long (north to south). It is made of re-used poros and conglomerate. Originally, it would have been faced in marble and it must have supported multiple statues. Behind this is another rectangular foundation measuring 1.15 x 1.50 metres.

The foundations were probably laid in the first half of the second century AD. Pottery sherds found in the foundations of the temple indicate a second-century date. The structure pre-dates the nymphaeum to the west, which was built in the mid-second century. The foundation of the temple is aligned with the pavement of the Panathenaic Way, showing that the temple was built after or at the time as the Way was repaved. This took place in the first half of the second century.

=== Superstructure ===
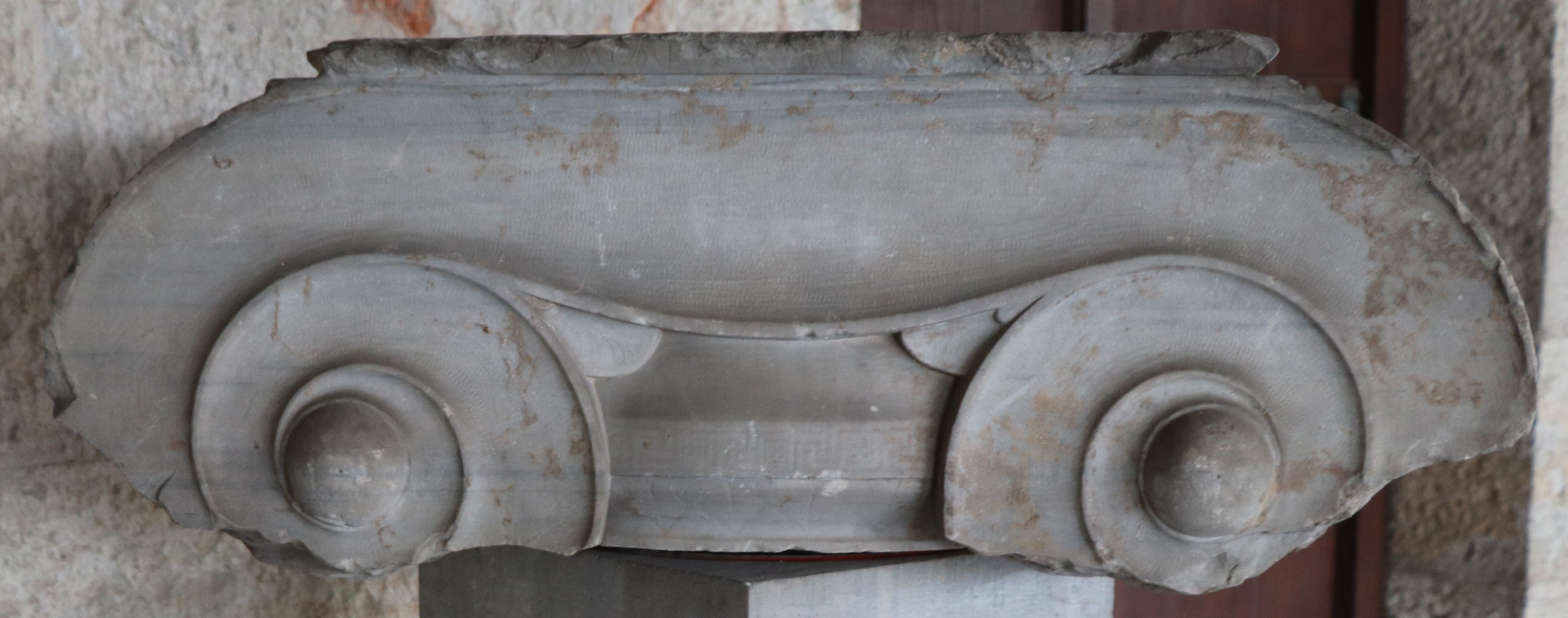
Ionic capital from the Southeast Temple of the Athenian Agora, later incorporated into the Post-Herulian Wall

No remains of the superstructure were found in situ, but a set of Ionic fragments, fit the measurements of the foundations. (Note: Initially a set of Doric architectural members from the double stoa at Thorikos found in the Post-Herulian wall, were connected with this temple: Thompson & Wycherley 1972, p. 166. However, the pronaos is too large for the number of columns that have been found:Dinsmoor 1982, pp. 425–428. These fragments have since been assigned to the Southwest Temple: Dinsmoor 1982, p. 429.) There are fifteen column drums, one complete Ionic capital, twelve fragments from further capitals, a fragment from a column base, a block from the geison, part of crowning moulding of the cornice, and a tiny part of the moulding from the epistyle. These fragments were found in the section of the Post-Herulian wall directly opposite the temple and scattered around the temple to the north and west in late contexts, but they originally came from the Temple of Athena at Sounion, which had probably gone out of use following Philip V of Macedon's attack on Attic rural sanctuaries in 200 BC. The column drums are labelled with mason's marks (Γ, Θ, Λ, Ν, Π, Σ, Τ, Ω), which were used to correctly reassemble the blocks in the Agora.

The front façade of the temple consisted of a crepidoma of three steps. The temple was prostyle, meaning that it had columns only at the front, not on the sides or at the back, and octastyle, meaning that there were eight columns along the front façade. The distance between these columns (intercolumnation) was 1.531 metres. There were two columns on each sides of the porch, between the corner columns and the antae. These had an intercolumnation of 1.667 metres. The columns had a diameter of 0.65 metres at the base, tapering to 0.533 at the top. The shafts were 5.35 metres, plus a base of 0.32 metres and Ionic capitals with painted and carved decoration of 0.304, for a total height of 5.974. Above the columns was an epistyle. There was probably a frieze above this, which probably bore no relief sculpture, but evidence is limited. There was a geison above this. This supported a roof of marble tiles.

=== Sculpture ===
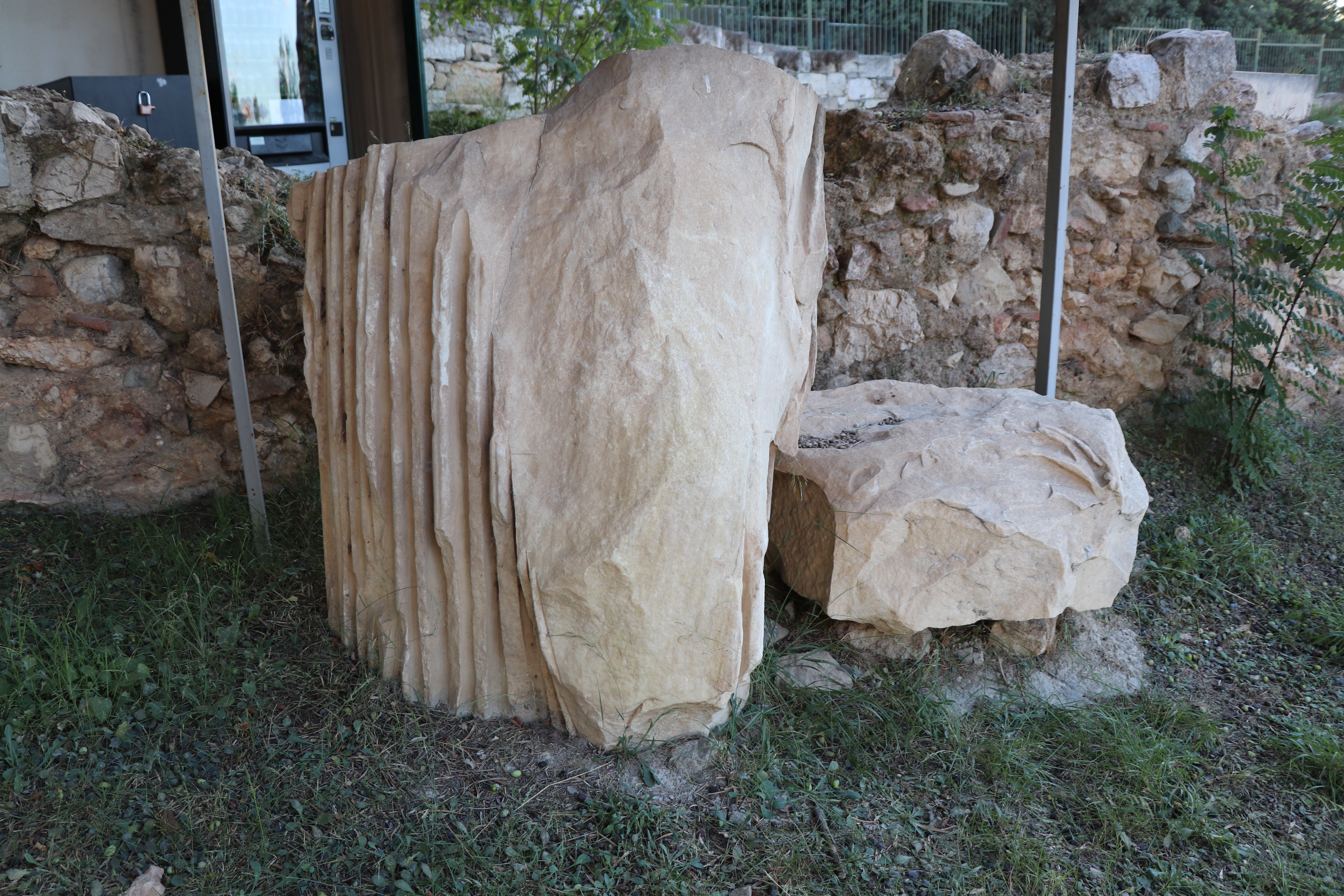
Colossal statue fragments found in the Southeast Temple (Agora inv. S 2070a and b).

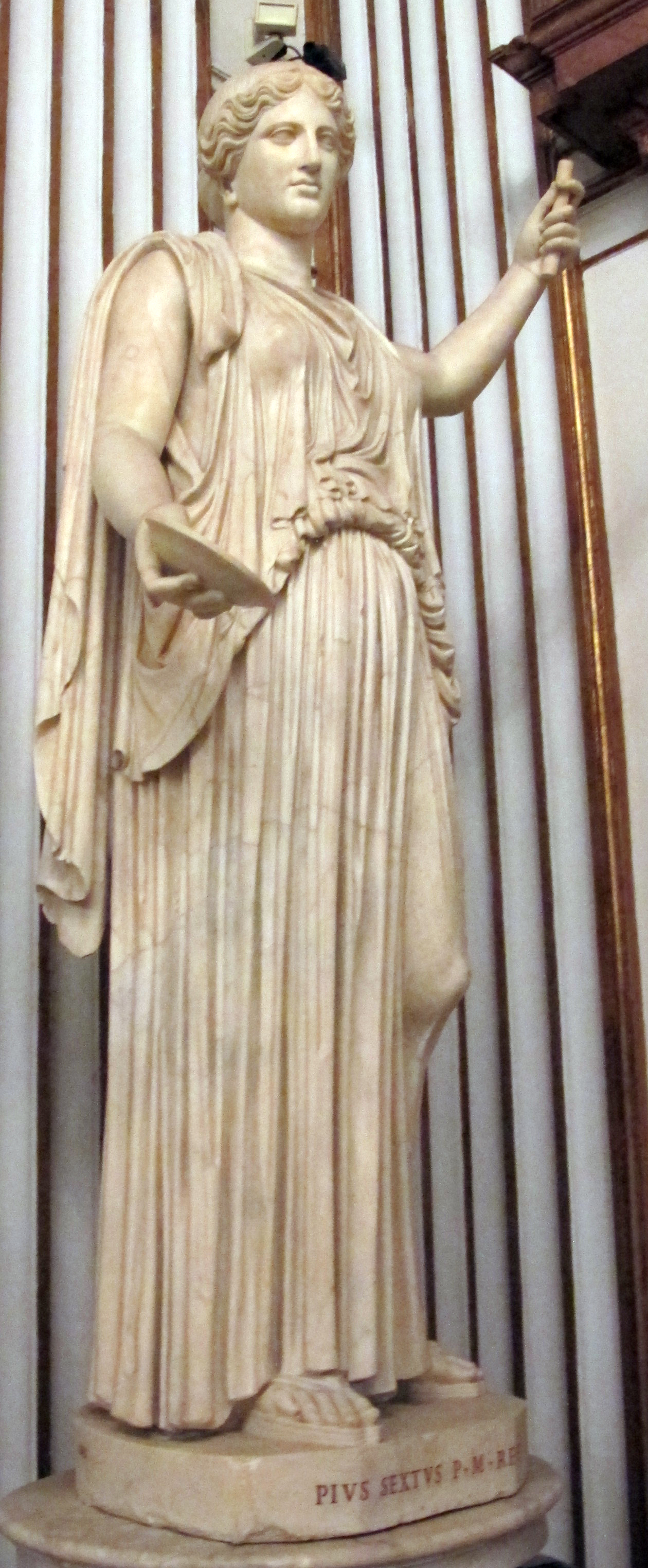
The "Capitoline Demeter" a Roman copy of a fifth-century BC sculpture, which closely resembles the fragments of the colossal statue found in the Southeast Temple.

The cult statue was a colossal female figure in a peplos, made from Pentelic marble, which would have been nearly four metres tall. Only three heavily damaged fragments survive. One of these (Agora inv. S 2070a) is the upper part of a torso, with cuttings where a left arm and head would have been attached. The second fragment (S 2070b) is the drapery from the lower hips and upper legs. These were found next to the base in the cella of the temple. A right foot (inv. S 1823) was found to the west. The closest stylistic comparandum is a statue in the Capitoline Museum in Rome. This is known as the "Capitoline Demeter," but it is unclear which deity it represents (Hera, Aphrodite, and Demeter are among the suggested identifications). This statue is a Roman-period copy of a late fifth-century BC original. The statue found in the Southeast Temple may have been the model for the Capitoline Demeter, but it is possible that both sculptures are copies of a lost original.

== Excavation ==
The foundations in the Agora were uncovered in excavations undertaken by the American School of Classical Studies at Athens. The foundations were uncovered as part of work undertaken in the southeast corner of the Agora between February and August 1959, which was managed by Dorothy Burr Thompson.

The remains of the superstructure were found during excavations of the Post-Herulian wall.

== Bibliography ==
- Thompson, Homer A. (1960). "Activities in the Athenian Agora: 1959". Hesperia: The Journal of the American School of Classical Studies at Athens. 29 (4): 327–368. doi:10.2307/147159. ISSN 0018-098X.
- Harrison, Evelyn B. (1960). "New Sculpture from the Athenian Agora, 1959". Hesperia: The Journal of the American School of Classical Studies at Athens. 29 (4): 369–392. doi:10.2307/147160. ISSN 0018-098X.
- Thompson, Homer A.; Wycherley, R. E. (1972). Athenian Agora XIV: The Agora of Athens: The History, Shape and Uses of an Ancient City Center. American School of Classical Studies at Athens. p. 167-166.
- Dinsmoor, William Bell (1982). "Anchoring Two Floating Temples". Hesperia: The Journal of the American School of Classical Studies at Athens. 51 (4): 410–452. doi:10.2307/147756. ISSN 0018-098X.
- Barletta, Barbara Ann; Dinsmoor, William B.; Thompson, Homer A. (2017). The sanctuary of Athena at Sounion. Princeton (N. J.): American School of Classical Studies at Athens. ISBN 978-0-87661-967-4.
